= Aloeides depicta =

Conservation status
- Least Concern (IUCN 3.1)

Scientific classification
- Kingdom: Animalia
- Phylum: Arthropoda
- Class: Insecta
- Order: Lepidoptera
- Family: Lycaenidae
- Genus: Aloeides
- Species: A. depicta

Binomial name
- Aloeides depicta Tite & Dickson, 1968

Species of butterfly

Aloeides depicta, the depicta copper, is a butterfly of the family Lycaenidae. It is found in South Africa, where it is known from fynbos and Nama Karoo along the mountains from Matjiesfontein to Gydo Mountain and the Eastern Cape.

== Description ==
The wingspan is 26–29 mm (1.0–1.1 in) for males and 29–35 mm (1.1–1.4 in) females. Adults are on wing from September to June. There are continuous generations in warmer months.

The hindwing of A. depicta is mostly convex. Physical traits resemble those of A. apicalis and A. margaretae.

== Habitat and behavior ==
These butterflies inhabit grassy areas with bare patches, such as grassy fynbos in the eastern cape, or highvield grasslands in other provinces.

Males on this genus exhibit territorial behavior, claiming specific unsurfaced areas where they can counter females and mate.

== Life cycle ==
=== Larval Morphology ===
Variation among larvae within the same colony is noted. The final instar larvae measure around 16mm. The head region is black, with a Y-shaped pale stripe down the centre above mandible, and small yellow patches on each side of it. Larval body contains 11 segments.

The first segment of the larval body has a dark plate which lightens towards the edges, ending on a dark mark on the outer edge. A pair of faintly red marked spiracles are found on each side of the plate. The body is blue-green in color and a red double stripe runs down the middle of the back of first segment to the last. They are covered with bold black setae that grow longer towards the rear and under spiracles.

The last (eleventh) segment has a flattened appearance, featuring white-centered black tubercles that have non-spiny hairs. This segment contains irregular reddish black markings. There is an absence of honey glands in A. depicta larvae. Final segment of A. depicta larvae are pale blue in color. These are relatively shorter than other species for example A. margaretae, due to not being reared by ants.

The larvae feed on Aspalathus species. They shelter under rocks close to their host plant. The ant species noted as host for these are Lepisiota capensis.
