= Fenchel's theorem =

Gives the average curvature of any closed convex plane curve

- Type: Theorem
- Field: Differential geometry
- Statement: A smooth closed space curve has total absolute curvature $\ge 2\pi$, with equality if and only if it is a convex plane curve
- First stated by: Werner Fenchel
- First proof in: 1929

In differential geometry, Fenchel's theorem is an inequality on the total absolute curvature of a closed smooth space curve, stating that it is always at least $2\pi$. Equivalently, the average curvature is at least $2 \pi/L$, where $L$ is the length of the curve. The only curves of this type whose total absolute curvature equals $2\pi$ and whose average curvature equals $2 \pi/L$ are the plane convex curves. The theorem is named after Werner Fenchel, who published it in 1929.

The Fenchel theorem is enhanced by the Fáry–Milnor theorem, which says that if a closed smooth simple space curve is nontrivially knotted, then the total absolute curvature is greater than 4π.

== Proof ==
Given a closed smooth curve $\alpha:[0,L]\to\mathbb{R}^3$ with unit speed, the velocity $\gamma=\dot\alpha:[0,L]\to\mathbb{S}^2$ is also a closed smooth curve (called tangent indicatrix). The total absolute curvature is its length $l(\gamma)$.

The curve $\gamma$ does not lie in an open hemisphere. If so, then there is $v\in\mathbb{S}^2$ such that $\gamma\cdot v>0$, so $\textstyle0=(\alpha(1)-\alpha(0))\cdot v=\int_0^L\gamma(t)\cdot v\,\mathrm{d}t>0$, a contradiction. This also shows that if $\gamma$ lies in a closed hemisphere, then $\gamma\cdot v\equiv0$, so $\alpha$ is a plane curve.

Consider a point $\gamma(T)$ such that curves $\gamma([0,T])$ and $\gamma([T,L])$ have the same length. By rotating the sphere, we may assume $\gamma(0)$ and $\gamma(T)$ are symmetric about the axis through the poles. By the previous paragraph, at least one of the two curves $\gamma([0,T])$ and $\gamma([T,L])$ intersects with the equator at some point $p$. We denote this curve by $\gamma_0$. Then $l(\gamma)=2l(\gamma_0)$.

We reflect $\gamma_0$ across the plane through $\gamma(0)$, $\gamma(T)$, and the north pole, forming a closed curve $\gamma_1$ containing antipodal points $\pm p$, with length $l(\gamma_1)=2l(\gamma_0)$. A curve connecting $\pm p$ has length at least $\pi$, which is the length of the great semicircle between $\pm p$. So $l(\gamma_1)\ge2\pi$, and if equality holds then $\gamma_0$ does not cross the equator.

Therefore, $l(\gamma)=2l(\gamma_0)=l(\gamma_1)\ge2\pi$, and if equality holds then $\gamma$ lies in a closed hemisphere, and thus $\alpha$ is a plane curve.
