= Nielsen realization problem =

Theorem in geometric topology

The Nielsen realization problem is a question asked by Jakob Nielsen (1932, pp. 147–148) about whether finite subgroups of mapping class groups can act on surfaces, that was answered positively by Steven Kerckhoff (1980, 1983).

== Statement ==
Given an oriented surface, we can divide the group Diff(S), the group of diffeomorphisms of the surface to itself, into isotopy classes to get the mapping class group π_{0}(Diff(S)). The conjecture asks whether a finite subgroup of the mapping class group of a surface can be realized as the isometry group of a hyperbolic metric on the surface.

The mapping class group acts on Teichmüller space. An equivalent way of stating the question asks whether every finite subgroup of the mapping class group fixes some point of Teichmüller space.

== History ==
Jakob Nielsen (1932, pp. 147–148) asked whether finite subgroups of mapping class groups can act on surfaces. Kravetz (1959) claimed to solve the Nielsen realization problem but his proof depended on trying to show that Teichmüller space (with the Teichmüller metric) is negatively curved. Linch (1971) pointed out a gap in the argument, and Masur (1975) showed that Teichmüller space is not negatively curved. Steven Kerckhoff (1980, 1983) gave a correct proof that finite subgroups of mapping class groups can act on surfaces using left earthquakes.
