= Earthquake map =

Concept in hyperbolic geometry

In hyperbolic geometry, an earthquake map is a method of changing one hyperbolic manifold into another, introduced by William Thurston (1986).

== Earthquake maps ==
Given a simple closed geodesic on an oriented hyperbolic surface and a real number t, one can cut the manifold along the geodesic, slide the edges a distance t to the left, and glue them back. This gives a new hyperbolic surface, and the (possibly discontinuous) map between them is an example of a left earthquake.

More generally one can do the same construction with a finite number of disjoint simple geodesics, each with a real number attached to it. The result is called a simple earthquake.

An earthquake is roughly a sort of limit of simple earthquakes, where one has an infinite number of geodesics, and instead of attaching a positive real number to each geodesic one puts a measure on them.

A geodesic lamination of a hyperbolic surface is a closed subset with a foliation by geodesics. A left earthquake E consists of a map between copies of the hyperbolic plane with geodesic laminations, that is an isometry from each stratum of the foliation to a stratum. Moreover, if A and B are two strata then E^{−1}_{A}E_{B} is a hyperbolic transformation whose axis separates A and B and which translates to the left, where E_{A} is the isometry of the whole plane that restricts to E on A, and likewise for B.

== Earthquake theorem ==
Thurston's earthquake theorem states that for any two points x, y of a Teichmüller space there is a unique left earthquake from x to y. It was proved by William Thurston in a course in Princeton in 1976–1977, but at the time he did not publish it, and the first published statement and proof was given by Kerckhoff (1983), who used it to solve the Nielsen realization problem.
