= Pannwitz =

Pannwitz is a surname. Notable people with the surname include:

- Erika Pannwitz (1904–1975), German mathematician
- Heinz Pannwitz (1911–1975), German Gestapo and Schutzstaffel (SS) officer
- Helmuth von Pannwitz (1898–1947), German general
- Rudolf Pannwitz (1881–1969), German writer, poet and philosopher
