= Fenchel–Nielsen coordinates =

In mathematics, Fenchel–Nielsen coordinates are coordinates for Teichmüller space introduced by Werner Fenchel and Jakob Nielsen.

== Definition ==
Suppose that S is a compact Riemann surface of genus g > 1. The Fenchel–Nielsen coordinates depend on a choice of 6g − 6 curves on S, as follows. The Riemann surface S can be divided up into 2g − 2 pairs of pants by cutting along 3g − 3 disjoint simple closed curves. For each of these 3g − 3 curves γ, choose an arc crossing it that ends in other boundary components of the pairs of pants with boundary containing γ.

The Fenchel–Nielsen coordinates for a point of the Teichmüller space of S consist of 3g − 3 positive real numbers called the lengths and 3g − 3 real numbers called the twists. A point of Teichmüller space is represented by a hyperbolic metric on S.

The lengths of the Fenchel–Nielsen coordinates are the lengths of geodesics homotopic to the 3g − 3 disjoint simple closed curves.

The twists of the Fenchel–Nielsen coordinates are given as follows. There is one twist for each of the 3g − 3 curves crossing one of the 3g − 3 disjoint simple closed curves γ. Each of these is homotopic to a curve that consists of 3 geodesic segments, the middle one of which follows the geodesic of γ. The twist is the (positive or negative) distance the middle segment travels along the geodesic of γ.

== See also ==
- Dehn twist
