= Steven Kerckhoff =

American mathematician

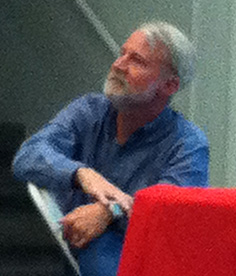
Kerckhoff gives a talk to Stanford freshmen on choosing courses in mathematics.

Steven Paul Kerckhoff (born 1952) is a professor of mathematics at Stanford University, who works on hyperbolic 3-manifolds and Teichmüller spaces.

He received his Ph.D. in mathematics from Princeton University in 1978, under the direction of William Thurston. Among his most famous results is his resolution of the Nielsen realization problem, a 1932 conjecture by Jakob Nielsen. Along with William J. Floyd, he wrote large parts of Thurston's influential Princeton lecture notes, and he is well known for his work (some of which is joint with Craig Hodgson) in exploring and clarifying Thurston's hyperbolic Dehn surgery.

Kerckhoff is one of four academics from Stanford University, along with Gunnar Carlsson, Ralph Cohen, and R. James Milgram, who were instrumental in developing the controversial California Mathematics Academic Content Standards for the State Board of Education.

== Selected publications ==
- Kerckhoff, Steven P. (1983). "The Nielsen realization problem". Annals of Mathematics. 2nd series. 117 (2): 235–265. doi:10.2307/2007076. JSTOR 2007076. MR 0690845.
- Kerckhoff, Steven P.; Thurston, William P., Noncontinuity of the action of the modular group at Bers' boundary of Teichmüller space. Inventiones Mathematicae 100 (1990), no. 1, 25–47.
- Kerckhoff, Steven; Masur, Howard; Smillie, John, Ergodicity of billiard flows and quadratic differentials. Annals of Mathematics (2) 124 (1986), no. 2, 293–311.
- Cooper, Daryl; Hodgson, Craig D.; Kerckhoff, Steven P. Three-dimensional orbifolds and cone-manifolds. With a postface by Sadayoshi Kojima. MSJ Memoirs, 5. Mathematical Society of Japan, Tokyo, 2000. x+170 pp. ISBN 4-931469-05-1
- Hodgson, Craig D.; Kerckhoff, Steven P., Rigidity of hyperbolic cone-manifolds and hyperbolic Dehn surgery. Journal of Differential Geometry 48 (1998), no. 1, 1–59.
