= Aloeides margaretae =

Marguarite's copper

Conservation status
- Least Concern (IUCN 3.1)

Scientific classification
- Kingdom: Animalia
- Phylum: Arthropoda
- Class: Insecta
- Order: Lepidoptera
- Family: Lycaenidae
- Genus: Aloeides
- Species: A. margaretae

Binomial name
- Aloeides margaretae Tite & Dickson, 1968

Species of butterfly

Aloeides margaretae, the Marguarite's copper, is a butterfly of the family Lycaenidae. It is found in South Africa, where it is known from the western coast and along the south coast in the Western Cape.

== Description ==
The wingspan is 25–30 mm (0.98–1.18 in) for males and 26–33 mm (1.0–1.3 in) females. Adults are on wing from September to May in several generations per year.

The shape of the forewing apex and hindwing in male butterflies is inconsistent, varying from concave to convex. Despite some variability, the hindwing is nearly straight in most cases, with basic wing patterns consistent across all species.

A. margaretae have been confused with A.apicalis due to sympatric occurrence and physical similarities.

== Habitat and behavior ==
These butterflies inhabit grassy areas with bare patches, such as grassy fynbos in the western cape, or Highveld grasslands in other provinces.

Males on this genus exhibit territorial behavior, claiming specific unsurfaced areas where they can counter females and mate.

The larvae follow a mutualistic relationship with ant species Monomorium fridae, and feed on Aspalathus spinosa species. These ants have a more aggressive behavior, as opposed to Lepisiota capensis which guard A. pallida. Furthermore, unlike those, the larvae of A. margaretae do not enter the ants' nests.

== Life cycle ==
Oviposition occurs a few metres away from nest, near the host plant. After a hatch duration of about 18 days, newly emerged larvae do not crawl into the nests and remain near host plants. Larval behavior of this species varies, as they transition from diurnal to nocturnal feeders with age. Total number of instars vary from six to eight.

The final instar larvae feature dull maroon stripes and striking yellow-orange patches, with black and white setae. The head carapace consists of a white stripe down the middle, flanked by a pair of brown bands with anteriorly pointed protrusions. The body contains 10 segments, with the ninth segment being distinctly shaped and colored from the rest. This segment tapers dorsally towards its distal margin, lacking the usual orange patches, with V-shaped setae encasing an obsolete DNO (Dorsal Nectary Organ). Mushroom-like setae are observed on the anal carapace on the last (tenth) segment, which is semi-circular in shape. It is equipped with a pair of black tubercles armed with spines at rims, and white tentacular organs near the DNO, exhibiting rapid evert-withdraw motion when disturbed.

Pupation period averages 18 days, in small alcoves near the host plant's stem. Colors of these larvae fade a day or two prior, eventually turning brown.
