= Convex curve =

Type of plane curve

A convex curve (black) forms a connected subset of the boundary of a convex set (blue), and has a supporting line (red) through each of its points.

A parabola, a convex curve that is the graph of the convex function $f(x)=x^2$

In geometry, a convex curve is a plane curve that has a supporting line through each of its points. There are many other equivalent definitions of these curves, going back to Archimedes. Examples of convex curves include the convex polygons, the boundaries of convex sets, and the graphs of convex functions. Important subclasses of convex curves include the closed convex curves (the boundaries of bounded convex sets), the smooth curves that are convex, and the strictly convex curves, which have the additional property that each supporting line passes through a unique point of the curve.

Bounded convex curves have a well-defined length, which can be obtained by approximating them with polygons, or from the average length of their projections onto a line. The maximum number of grid points that can belong to a single curve is controlled by its length. The points at which a convex curve has a unique supporting line are dense within the curve, and the distance of these lines from the origin defines a continuous support function. A smooth simple closed curve is convex if and only if its curvature has a consistent sign, which happens if and only if its total curvature equals its total absolute curvature.

== Definitions ==
Archimedes, in his On the Sphere and Cylinder, defines convex arcs as the plane curves that lie on one side of the line through their two endpoints, and for which all chords touch the same side of the curve. This may have been the first formal definition of any notion of convexity, although convex polygons and convex polyhedra were already long known before Archimedes. For the next two millennia, there was little study of convexity: its in-depth investigation began again only in the 19th century, when Augustin-Louis Cauchy and others began using mathematical analysis instead of algebraic methods to put calculus on a more rigorous footing.

Many other equivalent definitions for the convex curves are possible, as detailed below. Convex curves have also been defined by their supporting lines, by the sets they form boundaries of, and by their intersections with lines. In order to distinguish closed convex curves from curves that are not closed, the closed convex curves have sometimes also been called convex loops, and convex curves that are not closed have also been called convex arcs.

=== Background concepts ===
A plane curve is the image of any continuous function from an interval to the Euclidean plane. Intuitively, it is a set of points that could be traced out by a moving point. More specifically, smooth curves generally at least require that the function from the interval to the plane be continuously differentiable, and in some contexts are defined to require higher derivatives. The function parameterizing a smooth curve is often assumed to be regular, meaning that its derivative stays away from zero; intuitively, the moving point never slows to a halt or reverses direction. Each interior point of a smooth curve has a tangent line. If, in addition, the second derivative exists everywhere, then each of these points has a well-defined curvature.

A plane curve is closed if the two endpoints of the interval are mapped to the same point in the plane, and it is simple if no other two points coincide. Less commonly, a simple plane curve may be said to be open if it is topologically equivalent to a line, neither having an endpoint nor forming any limiting point that does not belong to it, and dividing the plane into two unbounded regions. However, this terminology is ambiguous as other sources refer to a curve with two distinct endpoints as an open curve. Here, we use the topological-line meaning of an open curve.

=== Supporting lines ===
A supporting line is a line containing at least one point of the curve, for which the curve is contained in one of the two half-planes bounded by the line. A plane curve is called convex if it has a supporting line through each of its points. For example, the graph of a convex function has a supporting line below the graph through each of its points. More strongly, at the points where the function has a derivative, there is exactly one supporting line, the tangent line.

Supporting lines and tangent lines are not the same thing, but for convex curves, every tangent line is a supporting line. At a point of a curve where a tangent line exists, there can only be one supporting line, the tangent line. Therefore, a smooth curve is convex if it lies on one side of each of its tangent lines. This may be used as an equivalent definition of convexity for smooth curves, or more generally for piecewise smooth curves. (Note: The assumption of smoothness is necessary when defining convex curves using tangent lines. There exist fractal curves, and even the graphs of continuous functions, that do not have any tangent lines, not even vertical or one-sided tangents. For these curves it is vacuously true that they lie on one side of each tangent line, but they are not convex.)

=== Boundaries of convex sets ===
A convex curve may be alternatively defined as a connected subset of the boundary of a convex set in the Euclidean plane. Not every convex set has a connected boundary, (Note: For a slab, the region between two parallel lines, the boundary is its two defining lines.) but when it does, the whole boundary is an example of a convex curve. When a bounded convex set in the plane is not a line segment, its boundary forms a simple closed convex curve. By the Jordan curve theorem, a simple closed curve divides the plane into interior and exterior regions, and another equivalent definition of a closed convex curve is that it is a simple closed curve whose union with its interior is a convex set. Examples of open and unbounded convex curves include the graphs of convex functions. Again, these are boundaries of convex sets, the epigraphs of the same functions.

This definition is equivalent to the definition of convex curves from support lines. Every convex curve, defined as a curve with a support line through each point, is a subset of the boundary of its own convex hull. Every connected subset of the boundary of a convex set has a support line through each of its points.

=== Intersection with lines ===
Four intersections of a line and a convex curve (here, a pentagon), top–bottom: the empty set, one point, two points, and an interval.

For a convex curve, every line in the plane intersects the curve in one of four ways: its intersection can be the empty set, a single point, a pair of points, or an interval. In the cases where a closed curve intersects in a single point or an interval, the line is a supporting line. This can be used as an alternative definition of the convex curves: they are the Jordan curves (connected simple curves) for which every intersection with a line has one of these four types. This definition can be used to generalize convex curves from the Euclidean plane to certain other linear spaces such as the real projective plane. In these spaces, like in the Euclidean plane, any curve with only these restricted line intersections has a supporting line for each point.

=== Strict convexity ===
The strictly convex curves again have many equivalent definitions. They are the convex curves that do not contain any line segments. They are the curves for which every intersection of the curve with a line consists of at most two points. They are the curves that can be formed as a connected subset of the boundary of a strictly convex set. Here, a set is strictly convex if every point of its boundary is an extreme point of the set, the unique maximizer of some linear function. As the boundaries of strictly convex sets, these are the curves that lie in convex position, meaning that none of their points can be a convex combination of any other subset of its points.

Closed strictly convex curves can be defined as the simple closed curves that are locally equivalent (under an appropriate coordinate transformation) to the graphs of strictly convex functions. This means that, at each point of the curve, there is a neighborhood of the points and a system of Cartesian coordinates within that neighborhood such that, within that neighborhood, the curve coincides with the graph of a strictly convex function. (Note: Many spirals are also locally convex but do not form closed curves. Non-convex polygons are closed curves that are locally equivalent to the graphs of piecewise linear convex functions, but these functions are not strictly convex.)

=== Symmetry ===
An oval with a horizontal axis of symmetry

Smooth closed convex curves with an axis of symmetry, such as an ellipse or Moss's egg, may sometimes be called ovals. However, the same word has also been used to describe the sets for which each point has a unique line disjoint from the rest of the set, especially in the context of ovals in finite projective geometry. In Euclidean geometry these are the smooth strictly convex closed curves, without any requirement of symmetry.

== Properties ==
=== Length and area ===
Every bounded convex curve is a rectifiable curve, meaning that it has a well-defined finite arc length, and can be approximated in length by a sequence of inscribed polygonal chains. For closed convex curves, the length may be given by a form of the Crofton formula as $\pi$ times the average length of its projections onto lines. It is also possible to approximate the area of the convex hull of a convex curve by a sequence of inscribed convex polygons. For any integer $n$, the most accurate approximating $n$-gon has the property that each vertex has a supporting line parallel to the line through its two neighboring vertices. As Archimedes already knew, if two convex curves have the same endpoint, and one of the two curves lies between the other and the line through their endpoints, then the inner curve is shorter than the outer one.

According to Newton's theorem about ovals, the area cut off from an infinitely differentiable convex curve by a line cannot be an algebraic function of the coefficients of the line.

A smooth convex curve through 13 integer lattice points

It is not possible for a strictly convex curve to pass through many points of the integer lattice. If the curve has length $L$, then according to a theorem of Vojtěch Jarník, the number of lattice points that it can pass through is at most
$$\frac{3}{\sqrt[3]{2\pi}}L^{2/3}+O(L^{1/3}).$$
Because this estimate uses big O notation, it is accurate only in the limiting case of large lengths. Neither the leading constant nor the exponent in the error term can be improved.

=== Supporting lines and support function ===
A convex curve can have at most a countable set of singular points, where it has more than one supporting line. All of the remaining points must be non-singular, and the unique supporting line at these points is necessarily a tangent line. This implies that the non-singular points form a dense set in the curve. It is also possible to construct convex curves for which the singular points are dense.

A closed strictly convex closed curve has a continuous support function, mapping each direction of supporting lines to their signed distance from the origin. It is an example of a hedgehog, a type of curve determined as the envelope of a system of lines with a continuous support function. The hedgehogs also include non-convex curves, such as the astroid, and even self-crossing curves, but the smooth strictly convex curves are the only hedgehogs that have no singular points.

It is impossible for a convex curve to have three parallel tangent lines. More strongly, a smooth closed curve is convex if and only if it does not have three parallel tangent lines. In one direction, the middle of any three parallel tangent lines would separate the points of tangency of the other two lines, so it could not be a line of support. There could be no other line of support through its point of tangency, so a curve tangent to these three lines could not be convex. In the other direction, a non-convex smooth closed curve has at least one point with no support line. The tangent line through that point, and the two tangent supporting lines parallel to it, form a set of three parallel tangent lines. (Note: There exist smooth open curves that do not have three parallel tangents but are not convex; the graph of any cubic polynomial is an example. For the graph of a function, the slope of any tangent line is the derivative of the function at that point, and since the derivative of a cubic is a quadratic polynomial, it produces any given slope at most twice.)

=== Curvature ===
An ellipse (red) and its evolute (blue), the locus of its centers of curvature. The four marked vertices of the ellipse correspond to the four cusps of the evolute.

According to the four-vertex theorem, every smooth closed curve has at least four vertices, points that are local minima or local maxima of curvature. The original proof of the theorem, by Syamadas Mukhopadhyaya in 1909, considered only convex curves; it was later extended to all smooth closed curves.

Curvature can be used to characterize the smooth closed curves that are convex. The curvature depends in a trivial way on the parameterization of the curve: if a regularly parameterization of a curve is reversed, the same set of points results, but its curvature is negated. A smooth simple closed curve, with a regular parameterization, is convex if and only if its curvature has a consistent sign: always non-negative, or always non-positive. (Note: Some non-simple closed curves such as the rose curves also have consistently-signed curvatures.) Every smooth simple closed curve with strictly positive (or strictly negative) curvature is strictly convex, but some strictly convex curves can have points with curvature zero.

The total absolute curvature of a smooth convex curve,
$$\int|\kappa(s)|ds,$$
is at most $2\pi$. It is exactly $2\pi$ for closed convex curves, equalling the total curvature of these curves, and of any simple closed curve. For convex curves, the equality of total absolute curvature and total curvature follows from the fact that the curvature has a consistent sign. For closed curves that are not convex, the total absolute curvature is always greater than $2\pi$, and its excess can be used as a measure of how far from convex the curve is. More generally, by Fenchel's theorem, the total absolute curvature of a closed smooth space curve is at least $2\pi$, with equality only for convex plane curves.

By the Alexandrov theorem, a non-smooth convex curve has a second derivative, and therefore a well-defined curvature, almost everywhere. This means that the subset of points without a second derivative has measure zero in the curve. However, in other senses, the set of points with a second derivative can be small. In particular, for the graphs of generic non-smooth convex functions, it is a meager set, that is, a countable union of nowhere dense sets.

=== Inscribed polygons ===
The boundary of any convex polygon forms a convex curve (one that is a piecewise linear curve and not strictly convex). A polygon that is inscribed in any strictly convex curve, with its vertices in order along the curve, must be a convex polygon.

The inscribed square problem is the problem of proving that every simple closed curve in the plane contains the four corners of a square. Although still unsolved in general, its solved cases include the convex curves. In connection with this problem, related problems of finding inscribed quadrilaterals have been studied for convex curves. A scaled and rotated copy of any rectangle or trapezoid can be inscribed in any given closed convex curve. When the curve is smooth, a scaled and rotated copy of any cyclic quadrilateral can be inscribed in it. However, the assumption of smoothness is necessary for this result, because some right kites cannot be inscribed in some obtuse isosceles triangles. Regular polygons with more than four sides cannot be inscribed in all closed convex curves, because the curve formed by a semicircle and its diameter does not contain any of these polygons.

== See also ==
- Convex surface, the higher-dimensional generalization of convex curves
- List of convexity topics
