= Pair of pants (mathematics) =

Three-holed sphere

A pair of pants represented in space, with its boundary colored red.

In mathematics, a pair of pants is a surface which is homeomorphic to the three-holed sphere. The name comes from considering one of the removed disks as the waist and the two others as the cuffs of a pair of pants.

Pairs of pants are used as building blocks for compact surfaces in various theories. Two important applications are to hyperbolic geometry, where decompositions of closed surfaces into pairs of pants are used to construct the Fenchel-Nielsen coordinates on Teichmüller space, and in topological quantum field theory where they are the simplest non-trivial cobordisms between 1-dimensional manifolds.

== Pants and pants decomposition ==
=== Pants as topological surfaces ===
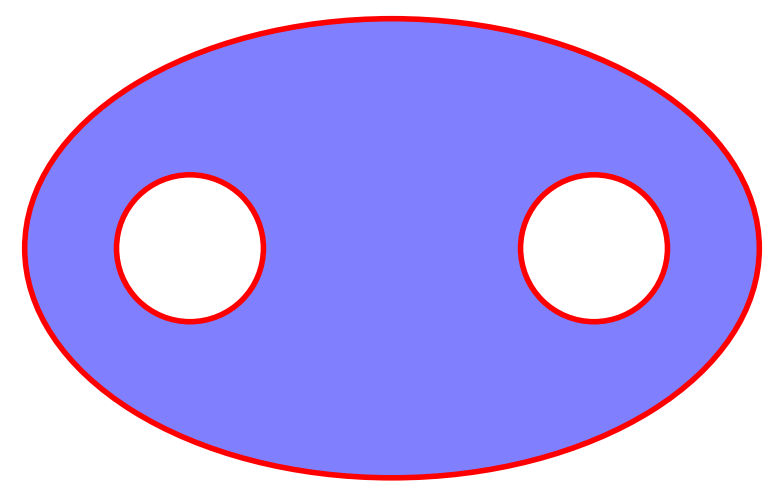
A pair of pants as a plane domain (in blue, with the boundary in red)

A pair of pants is any surface that is homeomorphic to a sphere with three holes, which formally is the result of removing from the sphere three open disks with pairwise disjoint closures. Thus a pair of pants is a compact surface of genus zero with three boundary components.

The Euler characteristic of a pair of pants is equal to −1. The only other orientable surface with this property is the punctured torus (a torus minus an open disk).

=== Pants decompositions ===
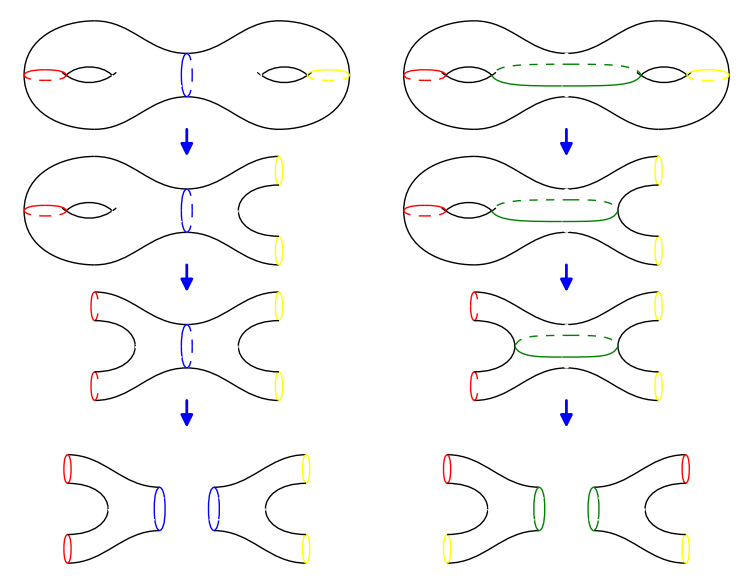
Two different pants decompositions for the surface of genus 2

This subsection assumes orientability, analogous results hold in the non-orientable case.

The importance of the pairs of pants in the study of surfaces stems from the following property: define the complexity of a connected compact surface $S$ of genus $g$ with $k$ boundary components to be $\xi(S) = 3g - 3 + k$, and for a non-connected surface take the sum over all components. Then the only surfaces with negative Euler characteristic and complexity zero are disjoint unions of pairs of pants. Furthermore, for any surface $S$ and any simple closed curve $c$ on $S$ which is not homotopic to a boundary component, the compact surface obtained by cutting $S$ along $c$ has a complexity that is strictly less than $S$. In this sense, pairs of pants are the only "irreducible" surfaces among all surfaces of negative Euler characteristic.

By a recursion argument, this implies that for any surface with negative Euler characteristic there is a system of simple closed curves which cut the surface into pairs of pants. This is called a pants decomposition for the surface, and the curves are called the cuffs of the decomposition. This decomposition is not unique, but by quantifying the argument one sees that all pants decompositions of a given surface have the same number of curves, which is exactly the complexity. For connected surfaces a pants decomposition has exactly $2g - 2 + k$ pants.

A collection of simple closed curves on a surface is a pants decomposition if and only if they are disjoint, no two of them are homotopic and none is homotopic to a boundary component, and the collection is maximal for these properties.

=== The pants complex ===
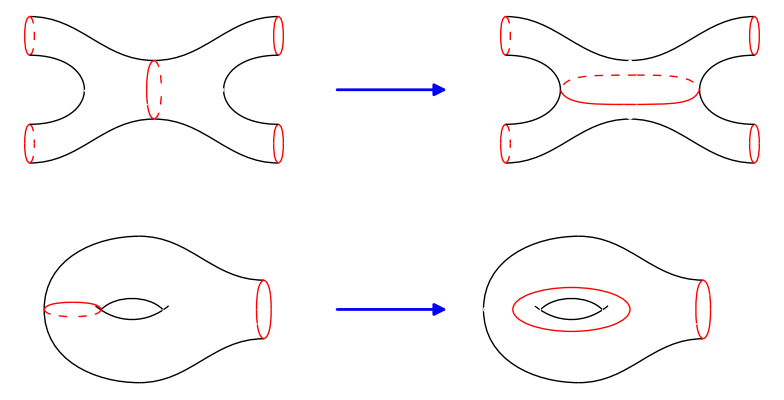
Elementary moves between pants decomposition

A given surface has infinitely many distinct pants decompositions (we understand two decompositions to be distinct when they are not homotopic). One way to try to understand the relations between all these decompositions is the pants complex associated to the surface. This is a graph with vertex set the pants decompositions of $S$, and two vertices are joined if they are related by an elementary move, which is one of the two following operations:

- take a curve $\alpha$ in the decomposition in a one-holed torus and replace it by a curve in the torus intersecting it only once,
- take a curve $\alpha$ in the decomposition in a four-holed sphere and replace it by a curve in the sphere intersecting it only twice.

The pants complex is connected (meaning any two pants decompositions are related by a sequence of elementary moves) and has infinite diameter (meaning that there is no upper bound on the number of moves needed to get from one decomposition to the other). In the particular case when the surface has complexity 1, the pants complex is isomorphic to the Farey graph.

The action of the mapping class group on the pants complex is of interest for studying this group. For example, Allen Hatcher and William Thurston have used it to give a proof of the fact that it is finitely presented.

== Pants in hyperbolic geometry ==
=== Moduli space of hyperbolic pants ===
The interesting hyperbolic structures on a pair of pants are easily classified.

For all $\ell_1, \ell_2, \ell_3 \in (0, \infty)$ there is a hyperbolic surface $M$ which is homeomorphic to a pair of pants and whose boundary components are simple closed geodesics of lengths equal to $\ell_1, \ell_2, \ell_3$. Such a surface is uniquely determined by the $\ell_i$ up to isometry.

By taking the length of a cuff to be equal to zero, one obtains a complete metric on the pair of pants minus the cuff, which is replaced by a cusp. This structure is of finite volume.

=== Pants and hexagons ===
The geometric proof of the classification in the previous paragraph is important for understanding the structure of hyperbolic pants. It proceeds as follows: Given a hyperbolic pair of pants with totally geodesic boundary, there exist three unique geodesic arcs that join the cuffs pairwise and that are perpendicular to them at their endpoints. These arcs are called the seams of the pants.

Cutting the pants along the seams, one gets two right-angled hyperbolic hexagons which have alternate sides of given lengths (the non-seam sides). The following lemma can be proven with elementary hyperbolic geometry.

If two right-angled hyperbolic hexagons have the same lengths of corresponding alternate sides, then they are isometric to each other.

So we see that the pair of pants is the double of a right-angled hexagon along alternate sides. Since the isometry class of the hexagon is also uniquely determined by the lengths of the remaining sides, the classification of pants follows from that of hexagons.

When a length of one cuff is zero one replaces the corresponding side in the right-angled hexagon by an ideal vertex.

=== Fenchel-Nielsen coordinates ===
A point in the Teichmüller space of a surface $S$ is represented by a pair $(M, f)$ where $M$ is a complete hyperbolic surface and $f: S \to M$ a diffeomorphism.

If $S$ has a pants decomposition by curves $\gamma_i$ then one can parametrise Teichmüller pairs by the Fenchel-Nielsen coordinates which are defined as follows. The cuff lengths $\ell_i$ are simply the lengths of the closed geodesics homotopic to the $f(\gamma_i)$.

The twist parameters $\tau_i$ are harder to define. They correspond to how much one turns when gluing two pairs of pants along $\gamma_i$: this defines them modulo $\ell_i\mathbb Z$. One can refine the definition (using either analytic continuation or geometric techniques) to obtain twist parameters valued in $\mathbb R$ (roughly, the point is that when one makes a full turn one changes the point in Teichmüller space by precomposing $f$ with a Dehn twist around $\gamma_i$).

=== The pants complex and the Weil-Petersson metric ===
One can define a map from the pants complex to Teichmüller space, which takes a pants decomposition to an arbitrarily chosen point in the region where the cuff part of the Fenchel-Nielsen coordinates are bounded by a large enough constant. It is a quasi-isometry when Teichmüller space is endowed with the Weil-Petersson metric, which has proven useful in the study of this metric.

=== Pairs of pants and Schottky groups ===
These structures correspond to Schottky groups on two generators (more precisely, if the quotient of the hyperbolic plane by a Schottky group on two generators is homeomorphic to the interior of a pair of pants then its convex core is an hyperbolic pair of pants as described above, and all are obtained as such).

== 2-dimensional cobordisms ==
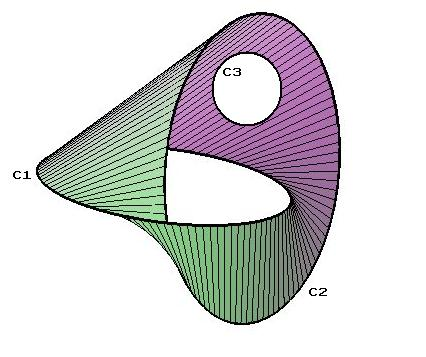
This link cobordism between the Hopf link and the unlink is topologically a pair of pants.

A cobordism between two n-dimensional closed manifolds is a compact (n+1)-dimensional manifold whose boundary is the disjoint union of the two manifolds. The category of cobordisms of dimension n+1 is the category with objects the closed manifolds of dimension n, and morphisms the cobordisms between them (note that the definition of a cobordism includes the identification of the boundary to the manifolds). Note that one of the manifolds can be empty; in particular a closed manifold of dimension n+1 is viewed as an endomorphism of the empty set. One can also compose two cobordisms when the end of the first is equal to the start of the second. A n-dimensional topological quantum field theory (TQFT) is a monoidal functor from the category of n-cobordisms to the category of complex vector space (where multiplication is given by the tensor product).

In particular, cobordisms between 1-dimensional manifolds (which are unions of circles) are compact surfaces whose boundary has been separated into two disjoint unions of circles. Two-dimensional TQFTs correspond to Frobenius algebras, where the circle (the only connected closed 1-manifold) maps to the underlying vector space of the algebra, while the pair of pants gives a product or coproduct, depending on how the boundary components are grouped – which is commutative or cocommutative. Further, the map associated with a disk gives a counit (trace) or unit (scalars), depending on grouping of boundary, which completes the correspondence.
