= Ropelength =

Knot invariant

In physical knot theory, each realization of a link or knot has an associated ropelength. Intuitively this is the minimal length of an ideally flexible rope that is needed to tie a given link, or knot. Knots and links that minimize ropelength are called ideal knots and ideal links respectively.

The ropelength problem is open: neither for knots nor for open knots in a long rope has an expression been found (in 2026) that describes the ropelength of tight, ideal knots. The problem is unsolved (as of 2026) for every non-trivial knot.

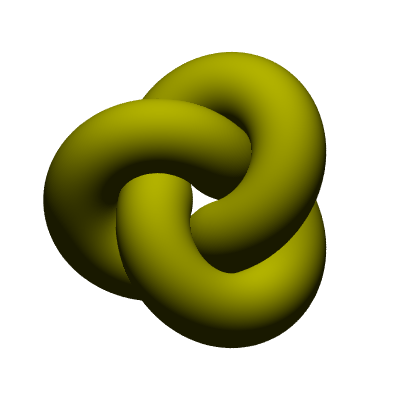
A numeric approximation of an ideal trefoil.

== Definition ==
The ropelength of a knotted curve $C$ is defined as the ratio $L(C) = \operatorname{Len}(C)/\tau(C)$, where $\operatorname{Len}(C)$ is the length of $C$ and $\tau(C)$ is the knot thickness of $C$.

Ropelength can be turned into a knot invariant by defining the ropelength of a knot $K$ to be the minimum ropelength over all curves that realize $K$.

== Ropelength minimizers ==
One of the earliest knot theory questions was posed in the following terms:

Can I tie a knot on a foot-long rope that is one inch thick?

This asks if there is a knot with ropelength $12$ or less. The answer is no: an argument using quadrisecants shows that the ropelength of any nontrivial knot has to be at least $15.66$. However, the search for the answer has spurred research on both theoretical and computational ground. It has been shown that for each link type there is a ropelength minimizer although it may only be of differentiability class $C^1$. For the simplest nontrivial knot, the trefoil knot, computer simulations have shown that its minimum ropelength is at most 16.372.

== Dependence on crossing number ==
An extensive search has been devoted to showing relations between ropelength and other knot invariants such as the crossing number of a knot. For every knot $K$, the ropelength of $K$ is at least proportional to $\operatorname{Cr}(K)^{3/4}$, where $\operatorname{Cr}(K)$ denotes the crossing number. There exist knots and links, namely the $(k,k-1)$ torus knots and $k$-Hopf links, for which this lower bound is tight. That is, for these knots (in big O notation),
$$L(K)=O(\operatorname{Cr}(K)^{3/4}).$$

The ropelength of any knot or link must be greater than a universal constant times the three-quarter power of the crossing number, but this constant is not known exactly. This constant is proven to be above 1.1, and torus knots have been tightened with computer simulations that show that this constant must not exceed 10.76.

On the other hand, there also exist knots whose ropelength is larger, proportional to the crossing number itself rather than to a smaller power of it. This is nearly tight, as for every knot,
$$L(K)= O(\operatorname{Cr}(K)\log^5(\operatorname{Cr}(K))).$$
The proof of this near-linear upper bound uses a divide-and-conquer argument to show that minimum projections of knots can be embedded as planar graphs in the cubic lattice. However, no one has yet observed a knot family with super-linear dependence of length on crossing number and it is conjectured that the tight upper bound should be linear.

== Torus knots ==
Torus knots are known empirically to have the smallest ropelength at a given crossing number. They are also highly symmetric which allows them to be constructed in units of tight non-overlapping configurations which can be extended to arbitrarily large crossing numbers by concatenating the units. A simple example is the double helix which may be concatenated ("stacked together") to form an alternating torus knot (of which the 3_{1}, 5_{1}, 7_{1}, 9_{1} knots are examples). Olsen and Bohr showed that the most efficient double helix has a contour length of 17 (and two essential crossings), meaning an alternating torus knot would have a ropelength of at most 8.5 per crossing. This number has been reduced through various constructions, the best currently known involves asymmetric double helices and requires 7.32 per crossing. These numbers are measured in radii, and would take half their value if measured in diameters.

It is known that non-alternating knots generally have a lower ropelength than alternating knots with the same crossing number. It has been proven that alternating knots have a ropelength that is at least linear with the crossing number, while non-alternating torus knots can be constructed such that their ropelength is at most a three-quarter power of the crossing number. This implies that at sufficiently large crossing numbers, non-alternating torus knots will have a lower ropelength than alternating torus knots. This is seen empirically even at low crossing numbers, for example the tightest known 10_{124} knot (a non-alternating torus knot) has a ropelength below 71, while the tightest known 9_{1} has a length of 75.5. Tight constructions of non-alternating T(3Q,Q) torus links will have a ropelength that is less than 19.11C^{0.75}, with the constant typically around 12-13 and bounded below by 5.

== Links ==
Topological links have a ropelength defined similarly to knots. Simple links can be constructed from unknots in such a way that they minimize ropelength. An example is the Hopf link that can be constructed from two circles with perpendicular inclination, each of radius 2, that pass through each others' centers. The ropelength in this case is 8π. Hopf links can be extended into ropelength minimizing linear chains, in which the interior components are minimized by stadium curves with length 4π+4. More generally, links composed of unknots in which each component has five or fewer components passing through it can be constructed in a way that minimizes ropelength, if each component takes the shape of the minimal convex hull around the cross sections of the curves passing through them. Torus links are subject to similar considerations as torus knots, discussed above.

The ropelength of Borromean rings is conjectured to be 58.006, based on a guitar-shaped construction of parameterized arcs. This tight Borromean configuration is used in the logo of the International Mathematical Union.
