= Tangent indicatrix =

In differential geometry, the tangent indicatrix of a closed space curve is a curve on the unit sphere intimately related to the curvature of the original curve. Let $\gamma(t)$ be a closed curve with nowhere-vanishing tangent vector $\dot{\gamma}$. Then the tangent indicatrix $T(t)$ of $\gamma$ is the closed curve on the unit sphere given by $T = \frac{\dot{\gamma}}{|\dot{\gamma}|}$.

The total curvature of $\gamma$ (the integral of curvature with respect to arc length along the curve) is equal to the arc length of $T$.
