= Schläfli double six =

Arrangement of 30 points and 12 lines

The Schläfli double six

In geometry, the Schläfli double six is a configuration of 30 points and 12 lines in three-dimensional Euclidean space, introduced by Ludwig Schläfli in 1858. The lines of the configuration can be partitioned into two subsets of six lines: each line is disjoint from (skew with) the lines in its own subset of six lines, and intersects all but one of the lines in the other subset of six lines. Each of the 12 lines of the configuration contains five intersection points, and each of these 30 intersection points belongs to exactly two lines, one from each subset, so in the notation of configurations the Schläfli double six is written 30_{2}12_{5}.

== Construction ==
As Schläfli showed, the double six may be constructed from any five lines a_{1}, a_{2}, a_{3}, a_{4}, a_{5}, that are all intersected by a common line b_{6}, but are otherwise in general position (in particular, each two lines a_{i} and a_{j} should be skew, and no four of the lines a_{i} should lie on a common ruled surface). For each of the five lines a_{i}, the complementary set of four out of the five lines has two quadrisecants: b_{6} and a second line b_{i}. The five lines b_{1}, b_{2}, b_{3}, b_{4}, and b_{5} formed in this way are all in turn intersected by another line, a_{6}. The twelve lines a_{i} and b_{i} form a double six: each line a_{i} has an intersection point with five of the other lines, the lines b_{j} for which i ≠ j, and vice versa.

An alternative construction, shown in the illustration, is to place twelve lines through the six face centers of a cube, each in the plane of its face and all making the same angles with respect to the cube's edges.

== Related objects ==
The 12-vertex crown graph, the intersection graph of the lines of the double six

A generic cubic surface contains 27 lines, among which can be found 36 Schläfli double six configurations. It may be necessary to use complex number coordinates to represent all of these lines; cubic surfaces can have fewer than 27 lines over the real numbers. In any such set of 27 lines, the 15 lines complementary to a double six, together with the 15 tangent planes through triples of these lines, has the incidence pattern of another configuration, the Cremona–Richmond configuration.

The intersection graph of the twelve lines of the double six configuration is a twelve-vertex crown graph, a bipartite graph in which each vertex is adjacent to five out of the six vertices of the opposite color. The Levi graph of the double six may be obtained by replacing each edge of the crown graph by a two-edge path. The intersection graph of the entire set of 27 lines on a cubic surface is the complement of the Schläfli graph.
