= Total absolute curvature =

Measure of curve's deviation; invariant under transformations

In differential geometry, the total absolute curvature of a smooth curve is a number defined by integrating the absolute value of the curvature around the curve. It is a dimensionless quantity that is invariant under similarity transformations of the curve, and that can be used to measure how far the curve is from being a convex curve.

If the curve is parameterized by its arc length, the total absolute curvature can be expressed by the formula

$$\int |\kappa(s)| ds,$$

where s is the arc length parameter and κ is the curvature. This is almost the same as the formula for the total curvature, but differs in using the absolute value instead of the signed curvature.

Because the total curvature of a simple closed curve in the Euclidean plane is always exactly 2π, the total absolute curvature of a simple closed curve is also always at least 2π. It is exactly 2π for a convex curve, and greater than 2π whenever the curve has any non-convexities. When a smooth simple closed curve undergoes the curve-shortening flow, its total absolute curvature decreases monotonically until the curve becomes convex, after which its total absolute curvature remains fixed at 2π until the curve collapses to a point.

The total absolute curvature may also be defined for curves in three-dimensional Euclidean space. Again, it is at least 2π (this is Fenchel's theorem), but may be larger. If a space curve is surrounded by a sphere, the total absolute curvature of the sphere equals the expected value of the central projection of the curve onto a plane tangent to a random point of the sphere. According to the Fáry–Milnor theorem, every nontrivial smooth knot must have total absolute curvature greater than 4π.
