= Oval =

Shape

This oval, with only one axis of symmetry, resembles a chicken egg.

An oval (from Latin ovum 'egg') is a closed curve in a plane which resembles the outline of an egg. The term is not very specific, but in some areas of mathematics (projective geometry, technical drawing, etc.), it is given a more precise definition, which may include either one or two axes of symmetry of an ellipse. In common English, the term is used in a broader sense: any shape which reminds one of an egg. The three-dimensional version of an oval is called an ovoid.

== Oval in geometry ==
The term oval when used to describe curves in geometry is not well defined, except in the context of projective geometry. Many distinct curves are commonly called ovals or are said to have an "oval shape". Generally, to be called an oval, a plane curve should resemble the outline of an egg or an ellipse. In particular, these are common traits of ovals:

- they are differentiable (smooth-looking), simple (not self-intersecting), convex, closed, and plane curves;
- their shape does not depart much from that of an ellipse; and

To the definition of an ovoid.

- an oval typically has an axis of symmetry, but this is not required.

Here are examples of ovals described elsewhere:

- Cassini ovals
- portions of some elliptic curves
- Moss's egg
- superellipse
- Cartesian oval
- stadium

An ovoid is the surface in three-dimensional space generated by rotating an oval curve about an axis of symmetry. The adjectives ovoidal and ovate mean having the characteristic of being an ovoid, and are often used as synonyms for "egg-shaped".

To the definition of an oval in a projective plane.

== Projective geometry ==
- In a projective plane a set Ω of points is called an oval, if:
1. Any line l meets Ω in at most two points, and
2. For any point P ∈ Ω, there exists exactly one tangent line t through P, i.e., t ∩ Ω = {P}.

For finite planes (i.e., the set of points is finite) there is a more convenient characterization:

- For a finite projective plane of order n (i.e., any line contains n + 1 points) a set Ω of points is an oval if and only if |Ω| = n + 1 and no three points are collinear (on a common line).

An ovoid in a projective space is a set Ω of points such that:

1. Any line intersects Ω in at most 2 points,
2. The tangents at a point cover a hyperplane (and nothing more), and
3. Ω contains no lines.

An oval egg shape.

In the finite case only for dimension 3, there exist ovoids. A convenient characterization is:

- In a 3-dimensional finite projective space of order n > 2 any pointset Ω is an ovoid if and only if |Ω|$=n^2+1$ and no three points are collinear.

== Egg shape ==
The shape of an egg is approximated by the "long" half of a prolate spheroid, joined to a "short" half of a roughly spherical ellipsoid, or even a slightly oblate spheroid. These are joined at the equator and share a principal axis of rotational symmetry, as illustrated above. Although the term egg-shaped usually implies a lack of reflection symmetry across the equatorial plane, it may also refer to true prolate ellipsoids. It can also be used to describe the two-dimensional figure that, if revolved around its major axis, produces the three-dimensional surface.

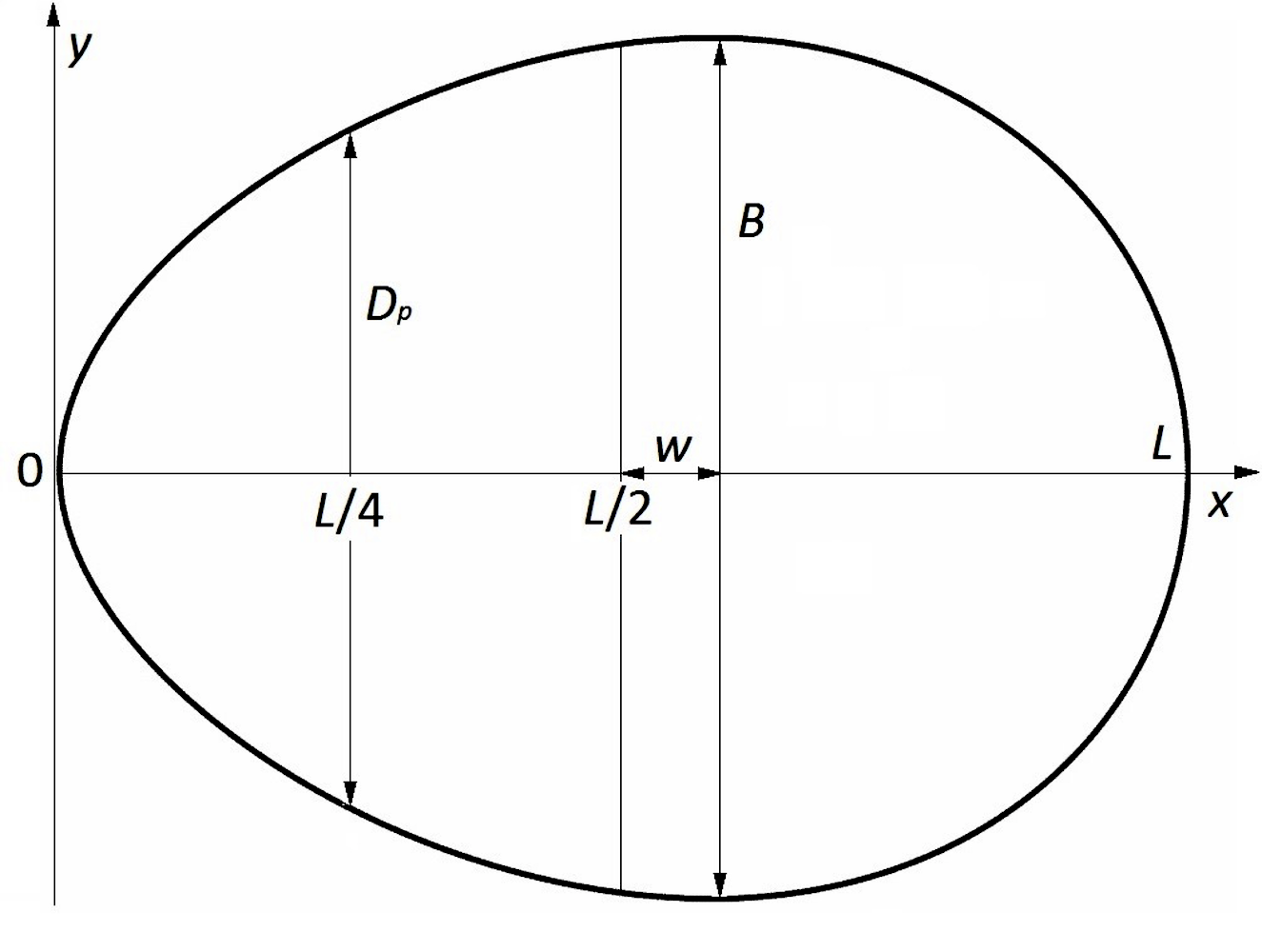
Oval and its four key geometrical parameters: length L, maximum breadth B, the shift w of the maximum breadth from the center, that is, from the point x = L/2, and the breadth D_{p} at a point 1/4 of the length from the pointed end.

== Mathematical definition of an oval ==
Based on the meaning of the word "oval" (i.e., "egg"), an oval refers to a flat representation of an egg. Since there are a variety of egg shapes in nature, a mathematical description should graphically reproduce the oval shape of any egg profile. Four key dimensions (measurements) can be adopted as the defining parameters of an oval:

- length L,
- maximum breadth B,
- the shift w of the maximum breadth from the center, that is, from the point x = L/2, and
- the breadth D_{p} at a point 1/4 of the length from the pointed end.

Accordingly, the mathematical formula for an oval can be written as follows:
$$y = \pm \frac{B}{2} \sin^n \left (\frac{\pi (1 - p) x}{x - pL} \right ),$$
in which
$$p = \frac{1}{2} \left [1 + \frac{1}{2} \left (\frac{w}{L} \right )^{-1} \right ],$$
$$n =  \frac{\ln \left (\frac{D_{p}}{B} \right )}{\ln \left [\sin \left (\pi \frac{1 - p}{1 - 4p} \right ) \right ]}.$$

It is more convenient to operate with various modifications of oval shapes when a unit length (L = 1) is used, and the oval parameters are presented as their combinations conventionally expressed by indices, that is, the shape index (B/L), the asymmetry index (w/L), and the conicity index (D_{p}/B). Herewith, the mathematical formula for a unit oval can be written as:
$$\frac{y}{L} = \pm \frac{1}{2} \cdot \frac{B}{L} \sin^n \left (\pi \frac{1 - p}{\frac{x}{L} - p} \cdot \frac{x}{L}\right ).$$

The variety of index values allows for countless variations of oval shapes, from standard geometric shapes such as the circle and ellipse, to classic egg-shaped ovals and even more exotic pyriform (pear-shaped) and biconical shapes.

Variations of oval shapes:
Images of ovals for different values of the three key indices

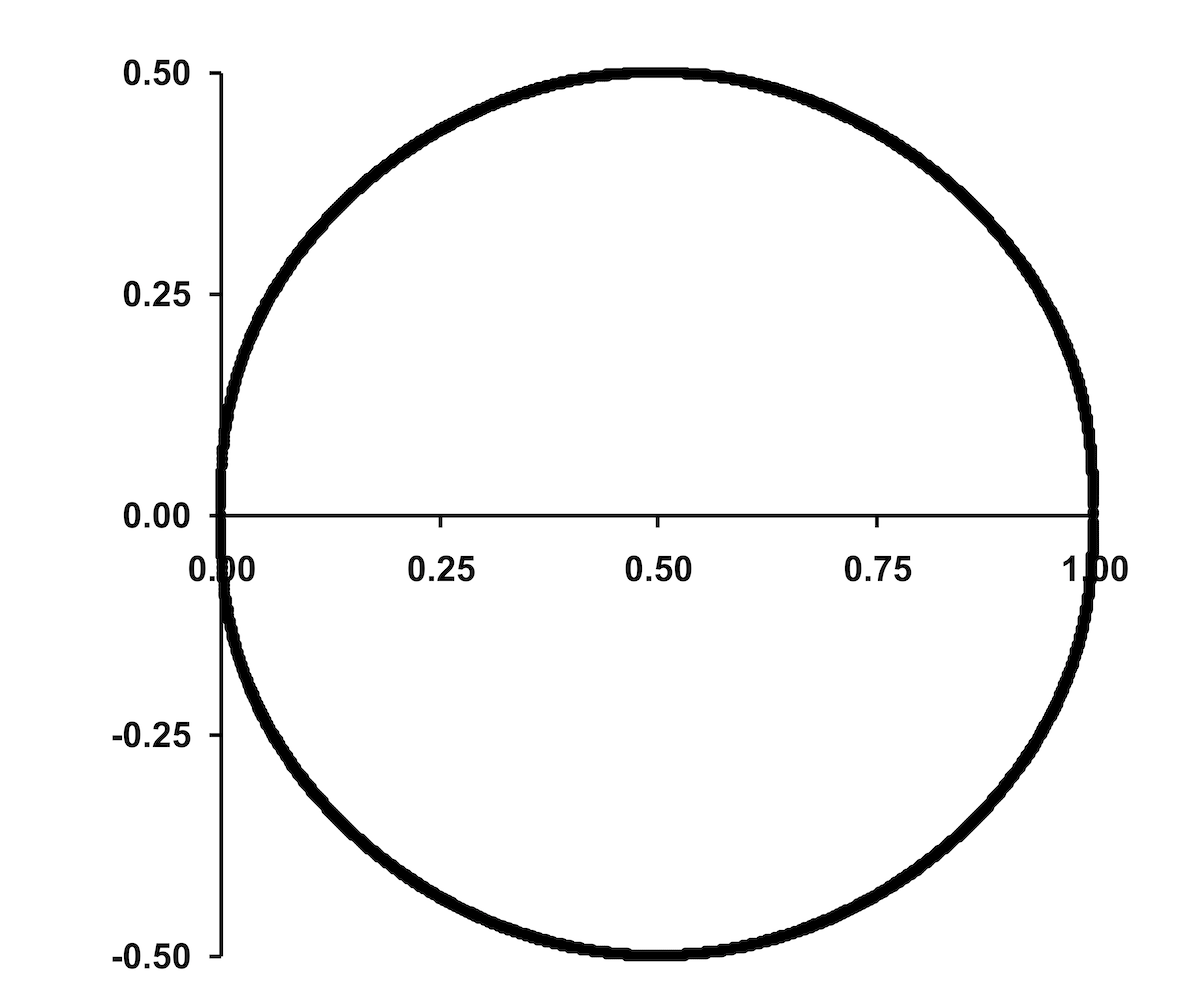
Circle
B/L = 1
w/L = 0
D_{p}/B = 0.866

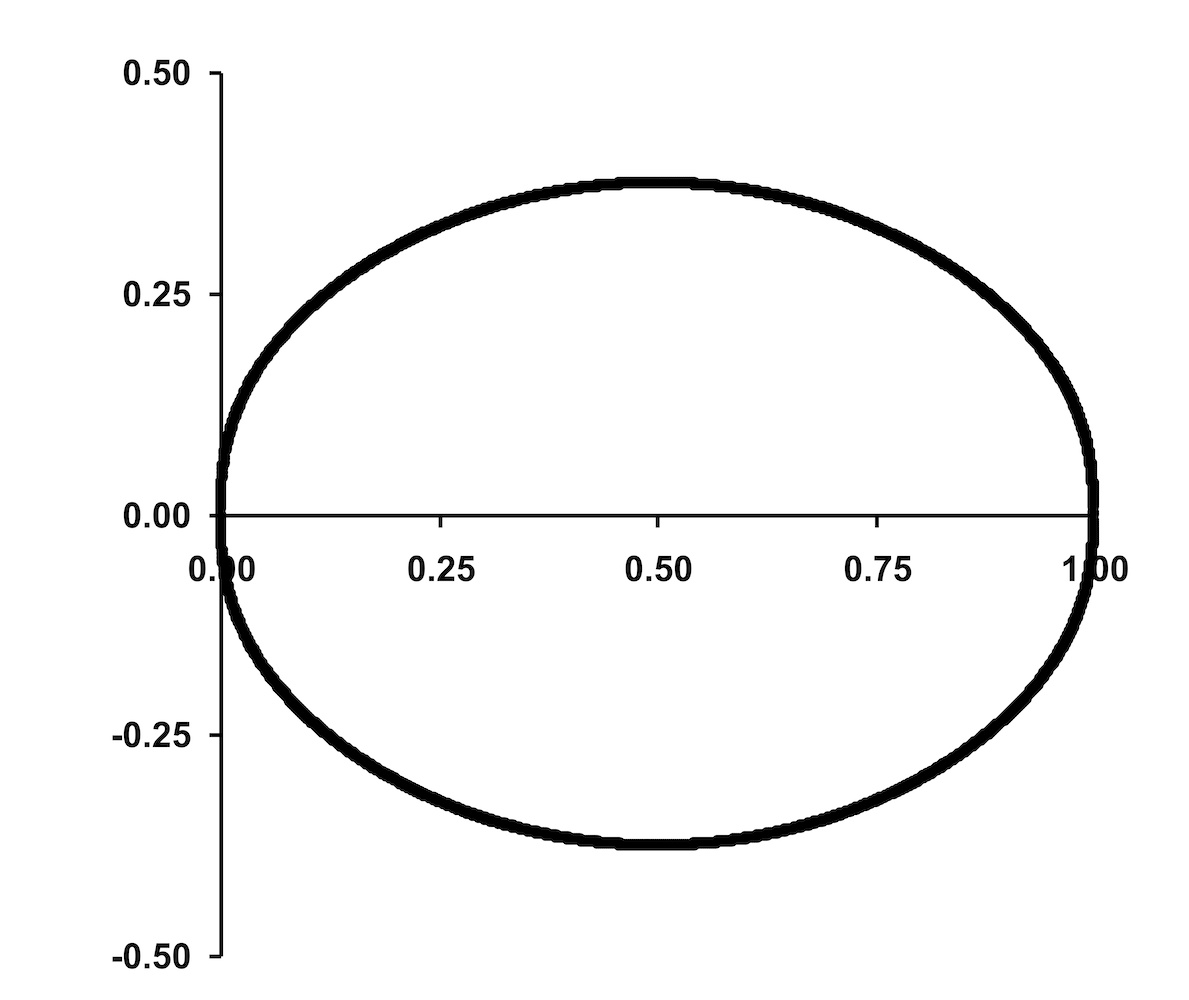
Ellipse
B/L = 0.75
w/L = 0
D_{p}/B = 0.866

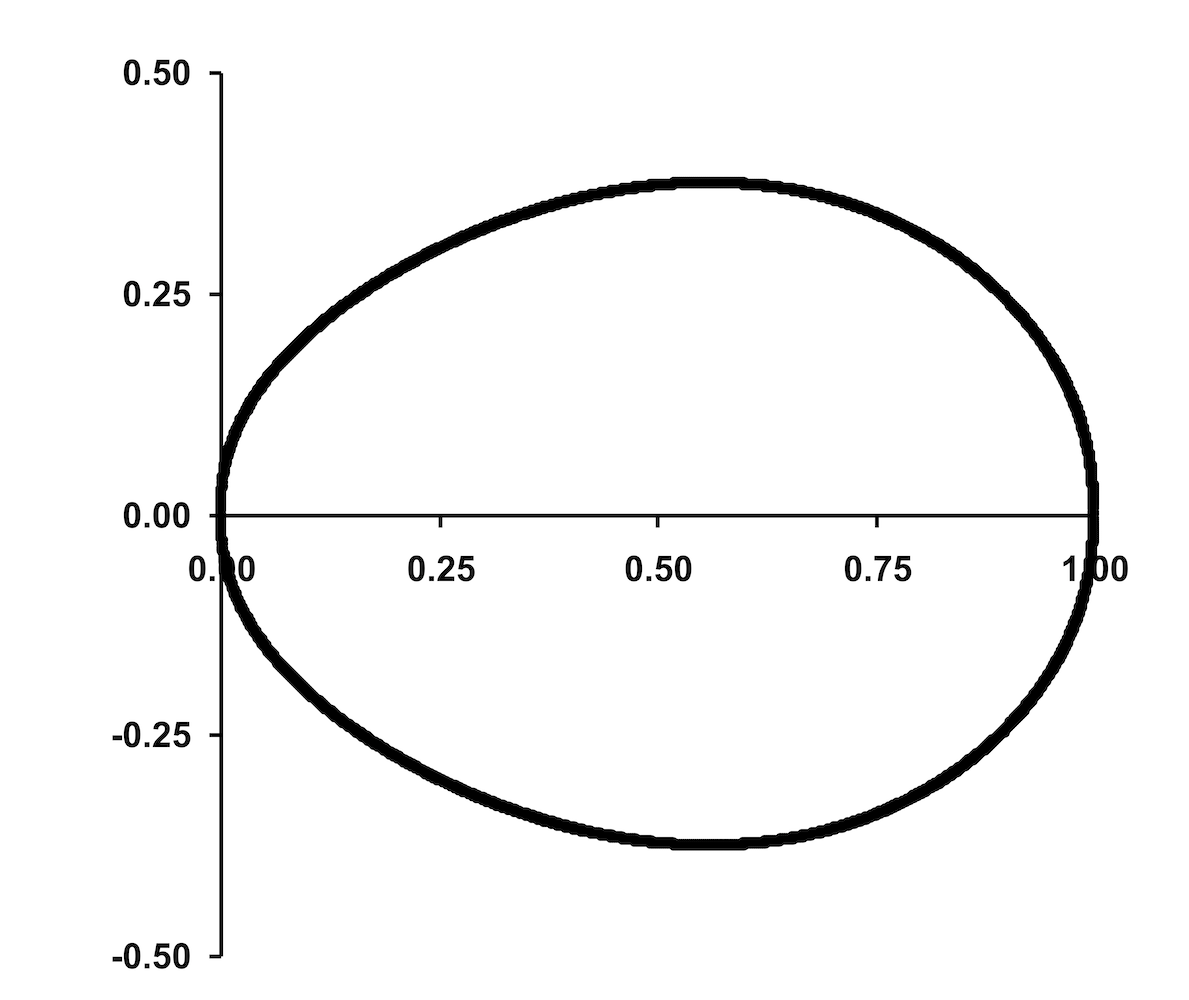
Classic egg
B/L = 0.75
w/L = 0.06
D_{p}/B = 0.8

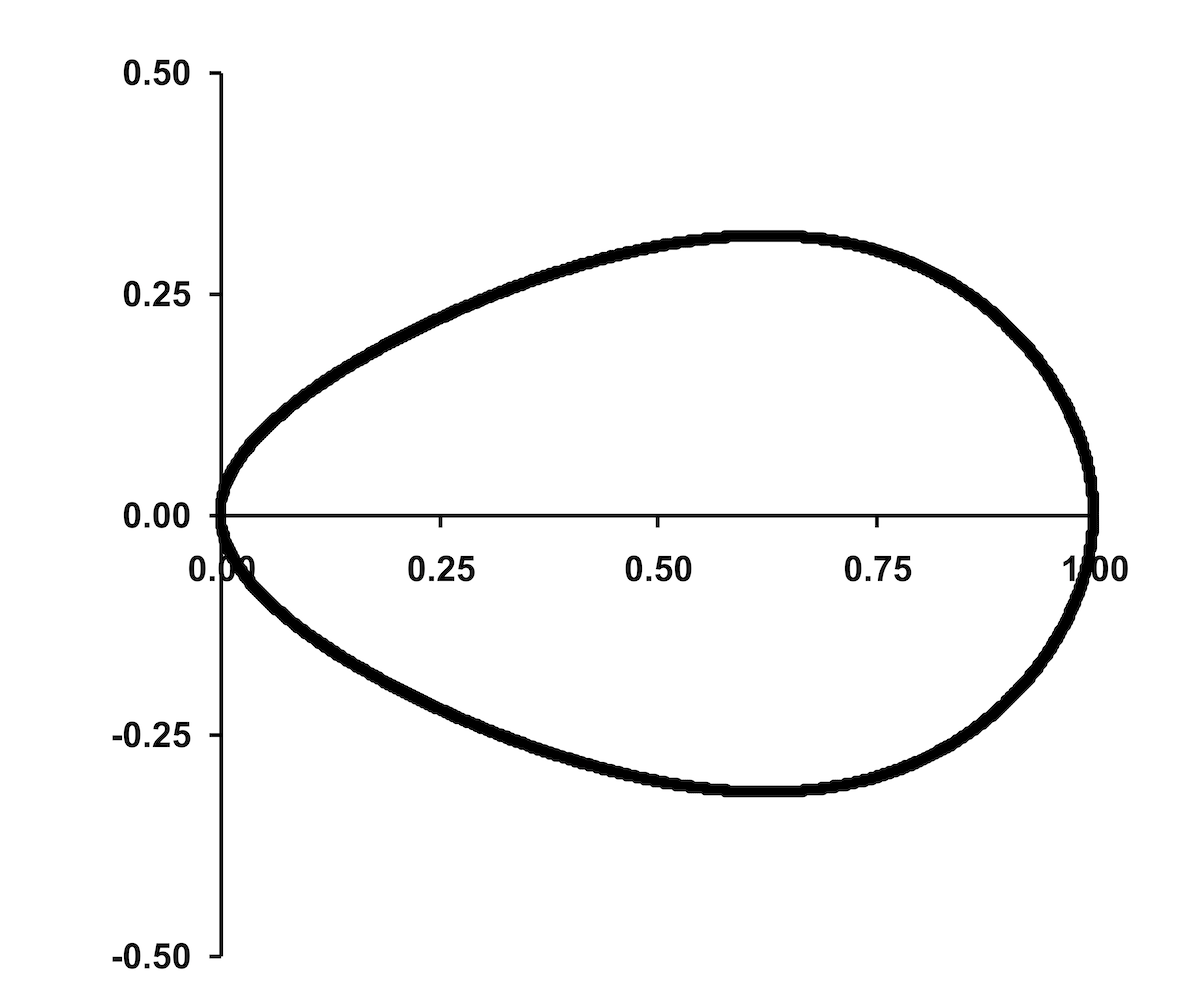
Pyriform (pear-shaped) egg
B/L = 0.63
w/L = 0.125
D_{p}/B = 0.7

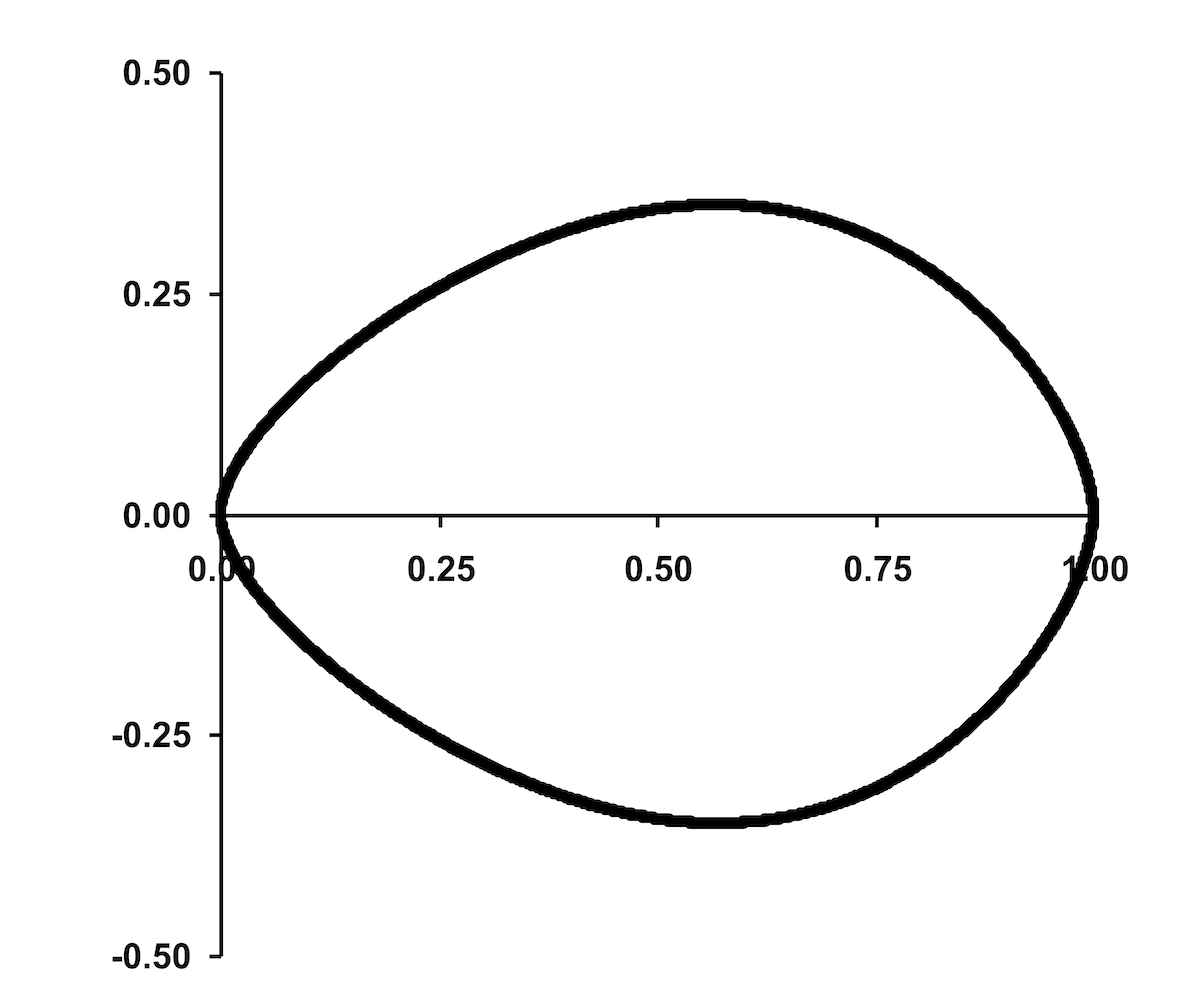
Biconical egg
B/L = 0.7
w/L = 0.07
D_{p}/B = 0.73

Certain values of the conicity index allow to transform a classical ellipse into a superellipse:

Ovals with index values that allow one to obtain images of superellipses

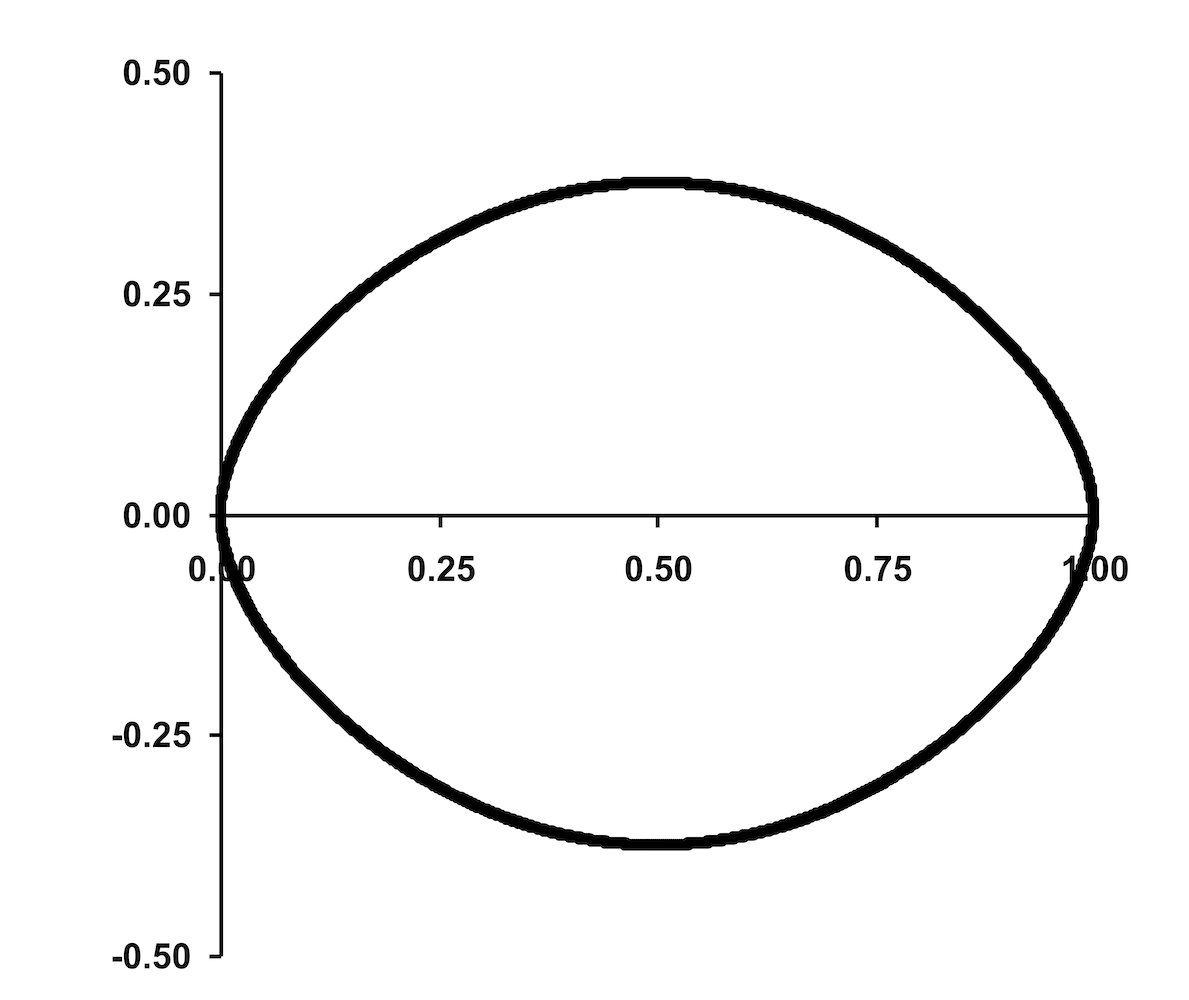
B/L = 0.75
w/L = 0
D_{p}/B = 0.825

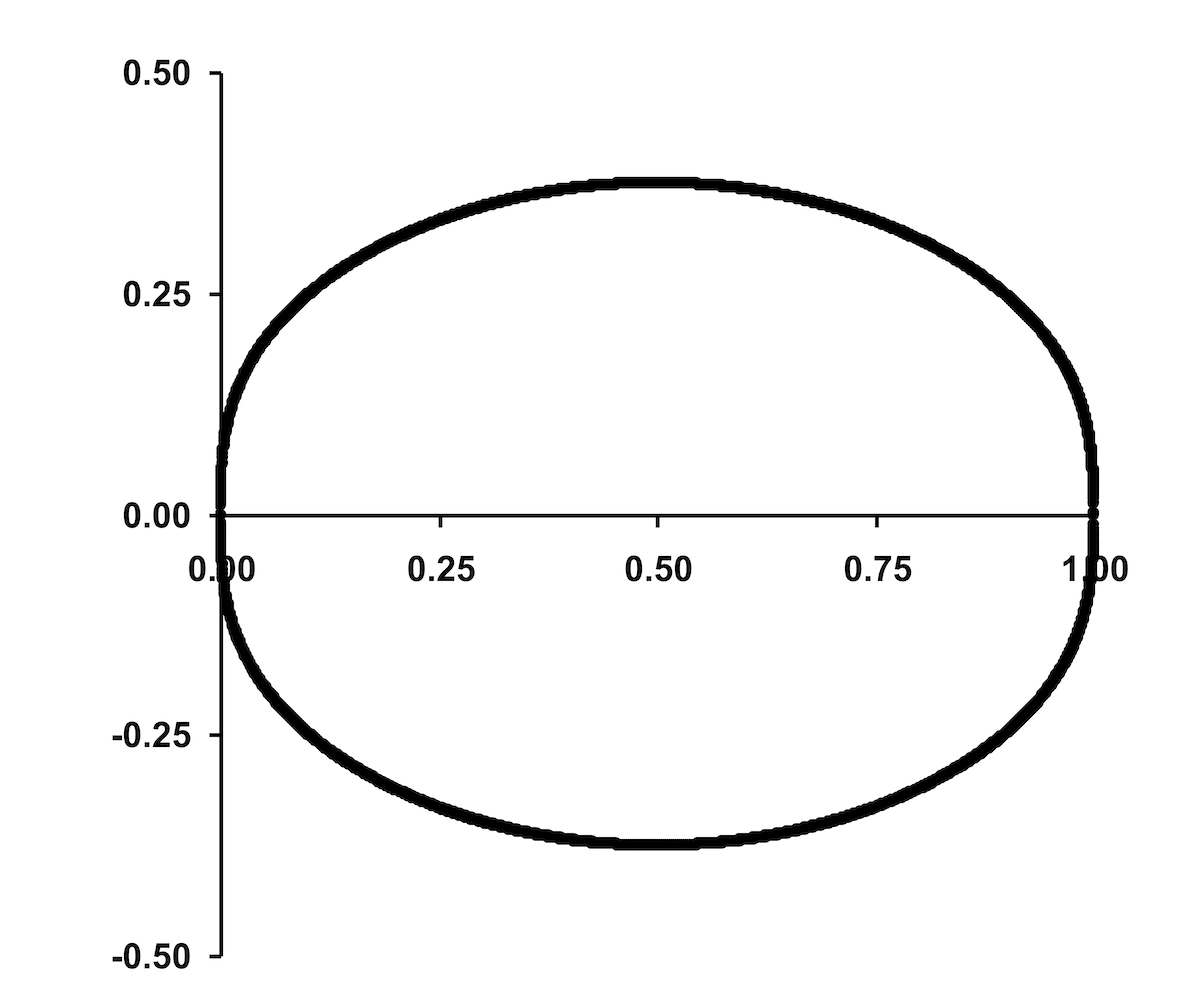
B/L = 0.75
w/L = 0
D_{p}/B = 0.885

== Technical drawing ==
An oval with two axes of symmetry constructed from four arcs (top), and comparison of blue oval and red ellipse with the same dimensions of short and long axes (bottom).

In technical drawing, an oval is a figure that is constructed from two pairs of arcs, with two different radii (see image on the right). The arcs are joined at a point in which lines tangential to both joining arcs lie on the same line, thus making the joint smooth. Any point of an oval belongs to an arc with a constant radius (shorter or longer), but in an ellipse, the radius is continuously changing.

== In common speech ==
In common speech, "oval" means a shape rather like an egg or an ellipse, which may be two-dimensional or three-dimensional. It also often refers to a figure that resembles two semicircles joined by a rectangle, like a cricket infield, speed skating rink or an athletics track. However, this is most correctly called a stadium.

A speed skating rink is often called an oval.

The term "ellipse" is often used interchangeably with oval, but it has a more specific mathematical meaning. The term "oblong" is also used to mean oval, though in geometry an oblong refers to rectangle with unequal adjacent sides, not a curved figure.

== See also ==
- Ellipse
- Ellipsoidal dome
- Stadium (geometry)
- Symbolism of domes
- Vesica piscis – a pointed oval

== Notes and references ==
=== References ===
- Dembowski, P. (1968). Finite Geometries. Ergebnisse der Mathematik und ihrer Grenzgebiete. Vol. 44. Berlin, New York: Springer-Verlag. ISBN 3-540-61786-8. MR 0233275.
