= Teichmüller modular form =

In mathematics, a Teichmüller modular form is an analogue of a Siegel modular form on Teichmüller space.
