= Newton's theorem about ovals =

The area cut off by a secant of a smooth convex oval is not an algebraic function

In mathematics, Newton's theorem about ovals states that the area cut off by a secant of a smooth convex oval is not an algebraic function of the secant.

Isaac Newton stated it as lemma 28 of section VI of book 1 of Newton's Principia, and used it to show that the position of a planet moving in an orbit is not an algebraic function of time. There has been some controversy about whether or not this theorem is correct because Newton did not state exactly what he meant by an oval, and for some interpretations of the word oval the theorem is correct, while for others it is false. If "oval" means merely a continuous closed convex curve, then there are counterexamples, such as triangles or one of the lobes of Huygens lemniscate y^{2} = x^{2} − x^{4}, while Arnold (1989) pointed that if "oval" means an infinitely differentiable convex curve then Newton's claim is correct and his argument has the essential steps of a rigorous proof.

Vassiliev (2002) generalized Newton's theorem to higher dimensions.

== Statement ==
The lemniscate of Gerono or Huygens; the area cut off by a secant is algebraic, but the lemniscate is not smooth at the origin

An English translation Newton's original statement (Newton 1934, lemma 28 section 6 book I) is:

"There is no oval figure whose area, cut off by right lines at pleasure, can be universally found by means of equations of any number of finite terms and dimensions."

In modern mathematical language, Newton essentially proved the following theorem:

There is no convex smooth (meaning infinitely differentiable) curve such that the area cut off by a line ax + by = c is an algebraic function of a, b, and c.

In other words, "oval" in Newton's statement should mean "convex smooth curve". The infinite differentiability at all points is necessary: For any positive integer n there are algebraic curves that are smooth at all but one point and differentiable n times at the remaining point for which the area cut off by a secant is algebraic.

Newton observed that a similar argument shows that the arclength of a (smooth convex) oval between two points is not given by an algebraic function of the points.

== Newton's proof ==
If the oval is a circle centered at the origin, then the spiral constructed by Newton is an Archimedean spiral.

Newton took the origin P inside the oval, and considered the spiral of points (r, θ) in polar coordinates whose distance r from P is the area cut off by the lines from P with angles 0 and θ. He then observed that this spiral cannot be algebraic as it has an infinite number of intersections with a line through P, so the area cut off by a secant cannot be an algebraic function of the secant.

This proof requires that the oval and therefore the spiral be smooth; otherwise the spiral might be an infinite union of pieces of different algebraic curves. This is what happens in the various "counterexamples" to Newton's theorem for non-smooth ovals.
