= Tommy Bonnesen =

Danish mathematician (1873–1935)

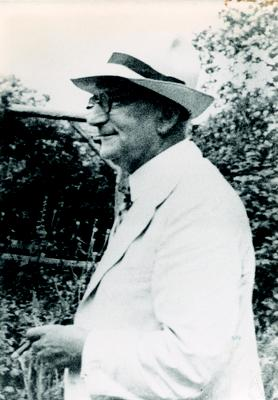
Tommy Bonnesen

Tommy Bonnesen (March 27, 1873, in Copenhagen – March 14, 1935) was a Danish mathematician and professor of geometry at the Polytechnical School. He is most known for Bonnesen's inequality.

He graduated from the Metropolitanskolen in 1892 and then began mathematical and natural science studies at University of Copenhagen. These studies were completed in 1896 with a master's conference in mathematics. In 1898, he received the university's gold medal for solving a prize problem, and in 1902, he earned his doctoral degree with the dissertation Analytical Studies on Non-Euclidean Geometry.

From 1906 to 1918, Tommy Bonnesen was a highly respected and beloved rector at Østre Borgerdyd Gymnasium|Østre Borgerdyd School. In connection with his teaching, he wrote several mathematics textbooks for high schools. He also frequently wrote on geometric topics in the Mathematical Journal – a journal published for many years until 1952 by the Danish Mathematical Society. From 1919 to 1935, Bonnesen, together with Harald Bohr, was an editor of this journal.

Tommy Bonnesen was a bright presence in the mathematical community of his time, known for his infectious humor and sharp wit. In 1917, he was appointed professor of descriptive geometry at the Polytechnical School, where he worked until his death.

Tommy Bonnesen is internationally known for his work in convex geometry, and a generalization of the isoperimetric inequality, which establishes a relationship between the radii of inscribed and circumscribed circles for convex figures, bears his name. Together with Werner Fenchel, Bonnesen published the renowned mathematical classic Theory of Convex Bodies in 1934 through Springer-Verlag. The book was published in English translation, Theory of Convex Bodies, in 1987.

Tommy Bonnesen was elected to the Royal Danish Academy of Sciences and Letters in 1930.

== Selected publications ==
- Analytiske Studier over ikke-euklidisk Geometri, Kopenhagen 1902
- with Werner Fenchel: Theorie der konvexen Körper, Springer 1934, English translation: Theory of convex bodies, Moscow (Idaho), BCS Associates 1987
- Les Problèmes des Isopérimètres et des Isépiphanes, Paris, Gauthier-Villars 1929
- Extréma liés, Kopenhagen 1931

== Sources ==
- Klaus Voss: Integralgeometrie für Stereologie und Bildrekonstruktion, Springer 2007, p.161
