= Käte Fenchel =

German mathematician (1905–1983)

- Born: Käte Sperling; 21 December 1905; Berlin
- Died: 19 December 1983 (aged 77)
- Education: University of Berlin
- Occupation: Mathematician
- Spouse: Werner Fenchel

Käte Fenchel née Käte Sperling (21 December 1905 – 19 December 1983) was a German-born Jewish mathematician, best known for her work on non-abelian groups.

== Life ==
Käte was born in Berlin to a newspaper reporter and a bookkeeper, Rusza Sperling (1878–1948). As a child, she quickly learned to read and write, faster than most children. She was allowed to skip several grade levels and was awarded scholarships to attend private school. She enrolled at the University of Berlin, but she found that she faced daunting obstacles there in the form of gender discrimination because she was pursuing studies in pure mathematics. She was encouraged to write a thesis, but she never obtained the doctorate.

As a result, Käte pursued an alternative career in mathematics education. After graduation, she began working at a job teaching mathematics at a German high school from 1931 to 1933 when Adolf Hitler and the Nazis rose to power in Germany. Käte lost her job because she was a Jew, as did Werner Fenchel, another German-born Jewish mathematician, who was removed from his teaching position in Göttingen.

The two mathematicians arrived in Copenhagen in November and married in December 1933. They were joined in December 1938 by Käte's mother, who was able to emigrate from Germany. In 1940, the couple's son was born.

While in Denmark, she helped facilitate the escape of other German Jews facing persecution. However, in 1940, the Nazi forces invaded that country so the young family, with Käte's mother, left with thousands of other refugees for Sweden. After the Allied liberation of Denmark, the Fenchels returned to Copenhagen, where Käte worked as a part-time lecturer job at Aarhus University in Denmark, from 1965-1970.

Fenchel died on 19 December 1983.

== Selected works ==
Fenchel authored several academic papers, and published the last of them at the age of 73.

- Fenchel, Käte. "On a theorem of Frobenius." Mathematica Scandinavica 42.2 (1978): 243-250.
- Fenchel, Käte. "A note about groups of odd order." Mathematica Scandinavica 10 (1962): 182-188.
- Fenchel, Käte. "Relationships between the structure of a finite group and a special representation." Monthly notebooks for mathematics 66.5 (1962): 397-409.
- Fenchel, Käte. "Moderne Algebra, Erster Teil, 2. Auflage.(Die Grundlehren der mathematischen Wissenschaften in Einzeldarstellungen, Band XXXIII)." (1938): 48-50.
- Fenchel, Käte. "L'algèbre abstraite. (Actualités scientifiques et industrielles, 362 (Abstract algebra)." (1938): 55-55.
- Fenchel, Käte. "Gruppen von linearen Transformationen.(Ergebnisse der Mathematik und ihrer Grenzgebiete, Bd. 4, Heft 2)." (Groups of Linear Transformations. (Results of Mathematics and its Borderlands, Vol. 4, Issue 2)). (1935): 116-117.

== Bibliography ==
1. E. Høyrup ``Käte Fenchel" in Women of Mathematics: A Bibliographic Sourcebook. L. Grinstein, P. Campbell, eds New York: Greenwood Press (1987): 30–32
