= Werner Fenchel =

German mathematician (1905–1988)

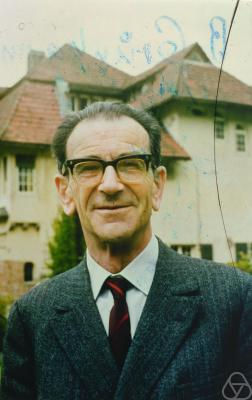
- Fenchel in 1972
- Born: Moritz Werner Fenchel; 3 May 1905; Berlin, German Empire
- Died: 24 January 1988 (aged 82); Copenhagen, Denmark
- Education: University of Berlin
- Known for: Fenchel's duality theorem Fenchel's theorem Fenchel–Moreau theorem Fenchel–Nielsen coordinates Fenchel–Young inequality Alexandrov–Fenchel inequality Legendre–Fenchel transformation
- Awards: Rockefeller Fellowship (1930); Membership in the Royal Danish Academy of Sciences and Letters (1946)
- Scientific career
- Fields: Mathematics: Geometry; Optimization
- Workplaces: Technical University of Denmark; University of Copenhagen
- Doctoral advisor: Ludwig Bieberbach
- Doctoral students: Birgit Grodal; Troels Jørgensen

Moritz Werner Fenchel (German: [ˈfɛnçəl]; 3 May 1905 – 24 January 1988) was a German-Danish mathematician known for his contributions to geometry and to optimization theory. Fenchel established the basic results of convex analysis and nonlinear optimization theory which would, in time, serve as the foundation for nonlinear programming. A German-born Jew and early refugee from Nazi suppression of intellectuals, Fenchel lived most of his life in Denmark. Fenchel's monographs and lecture notes are considered influential.

== Biography ==
=== Early life and education ===
Fenchel was born on 3 May 1905 in Berlin, Germany, his younger brother was the Israeli film director and architect Heinz Fenchel.

Fenchel studied mathematics and physics at the University of Berlin between 1923 and 1928. He wrote his doctorate thesis in geometry (Über Krümmung und Windung geschlossener Raumkurven) under Ludwig Bieberbach.

=== Professorship in Germany ===
From 1928 to 1933, Fenchel was Professor E. Landau's Assistant at the University of Göttingen. During a one-year leave (on Rockefeller Fellowship) between 1930 and 1931, Fenchel spent time in Rome with Tullio Levi-Civita, as well as in Copenhagen with Harald Bohr and Tommy Bonnesen. He visited Denmark again in 1932.

=== Professorship in exile ===
Fenchel taught at Göttingen until 1933, when the Nazi discrimination laws led to mass-firings of Jews.

Fenchel emigrated to Denmark somewhere between April and September 1933, ultimately obtaining a position at the University of Copenhagen. In December 1933, Fenchel married fellow German refugee mathematician Käte Sperling.

When Germany occupied Denmark, Fenchel and roughly eight-thousand other Danish Jews received refuge in Sweden, where he taught (between 1943 and 1945) at the Danish School in Lund. After the Allied powers' liberation of Denmark, Fenchel returned to Copenhagen.

=== Professorship postwar ===
In 1946, Fenchel was elected a member of the Royal Danish Academy of Sciences and Letters.

On leave between 1949 and 1951, Fenchel taught in the U.S. at the University of Southern California, Stanford University, and Princeton University.

From 1952 to 1956 Fenchel was the professor in mechanics at the Polytechnic in Copenhagen.

From 1956 to 1974 he was the professor in mathematics at the University of Copenhagen.

=== Last years, death, legacy ===
Professor Fenchel died on 24 January 1988.

== Geometric contributions ==
=== Optimization theory ===
Fenchel lectured on "Convex Sets, Cones, and Functions" at Princeton University in the early 1950s. His lecture notes shaped the field of convex analysis, according to the monograph Convex Analysis of R. T. Rockafellar.

== Books ==
- Fenchel, Werner; Bonnesen, Tommy (1934). Theorie der konvexen Körper. Ergebnisse der Mathematik und ihrer Grenzgebiete. Vol. 3. Berlin: 1. Verlag von Julius Springer.
- Fenchel, Werner (1953). Convex Cones, Sets, and Functions (PDF). Princeton, New Jersey: Princeton University Dept. of Mathematics.
- Fenchel, Werner; Bonnesen, Tommy (1971). Theorie der konvexen Körper. (Reprint of the 1948 German language edition). Bronx, New York: Chelsea Publishing Co.
- Fenchel, Werner; Bonnesen, Tommy (1974). Theorie der konvexen Körper. Berlin-New York: Springer-Verlag.
- Fenchel, Werner; Bonnesen, Tommy (1987). Theory of convex bodies. Moscow, Idaho: L. Boron, C. Christenson and B. Smith. BCS Associates. ISBN 9780914351023.
- Fenchel, Werner (1989). Elementary geometry in hyperbolic space. De Gruyter Studies in mathematics. Vol. 11. Berlin-New York: Walter de Gruyter & Co.
- Fenchel, Werner; Nielsen, Jakob (2003). Schmidt, Asmus L. (ed.). Discontinuous groups of isometries in the hyperbolic plane. De Gruyter Studies in mathematics. Vol. 29. Berlin: Walter de Gruyter & Co.

== See also ==
- Convex analysis
  - Convex cone
  - Convex function
  - Convex set
  - Legendre–Fenchel transformation
- Convex minimization
  - Fenchel's duality theorem
- Geometry
  - Convex geometry
    - Brunn–Minkowski theorem
  - Differential geometry
    - Fenchel's theorem
  - Hyperbolic geometry
    - Jakob Nielsen
    - Fenchel–Nielsen coordinates
- Nonlinear programming
