= Aloeides apicalis =

Pointed copper

Conservation status
- Least Concern (IUCN 3.1)

Scientific classification
- Kingdom: Animalia
- Phylum: Arthropoda
- Class: Insecta
- Order: Lepidoptera
- Family: Lycaenidae
- Genus: Aloeides
- Species: A. apicalis

Binomial name
- Aloeides apicalis Tite & Dickson, 1968

Synonyms
- Aloeides depicta apicalis Tite & Dickson, 1968

Species of butterfly

Aloeides apicalis, the pointed copper, is a butterfly of the family Lycaenidae. It is found in South Africa, where it is known from Western Cape and the Northern Cape.

== Description ==
The wingspan is 23–27 mm (0.91–1.06 in) for males and 25–30 mm (0.98–1.18 in) females. Adults are on wing from September to May in several generations per year.

The males of Aloeidis exhibit territorial behavior, claiming specific areas on road verges and unsurfaced roads where they can counter females and mate.

The outer margin of forewing varies from straight to slightly convex, similar to Aloeides margaretae. However its hindwing is almost straight with the presence of basic pattern of discoidal fascia.

== Habitat and Behavior ==
The butterflies of this group inhabit grassy areas with bare patches, such as grassy fynbos in the western and eastern cape, or highvield grasslands in other provinces.

Aloeides apicalis larvae are associated with Aspalathus host plants.

== Life cycle ==
The species is holometabolous.

The larvae follow a mutualistic relationship with the ant species Monomorium fridae.
