= Fáry–Milnor theorem =

Three-dimensional smooth curves with small total curvature must be unknotted

In the mathematical theory of knots, the Fáry–Milnor theorem, named after István Fáry and John Milnor, states that three-dimensional smooth curves with small total curvature must be unknotted. The theorem was proved independently by Fáry in 1949 and Milnor in 1950. It was later shown to follow from the existence of quadrisecants (Denne 2004).

== Statement ==
If K is any closed curve in Euclidean space that is sufficiently smooth to define the curvature κ at each of its points, and if the total absolute curvature is less than or equal to 4π, then K is an unknot, i.e.:

$$\text{If}\ \oint_K |\kappa(s)| \, \mathrm{d}s \le 4 \pi,\ \text{then}\ K\ \text{is an unknot}.$$

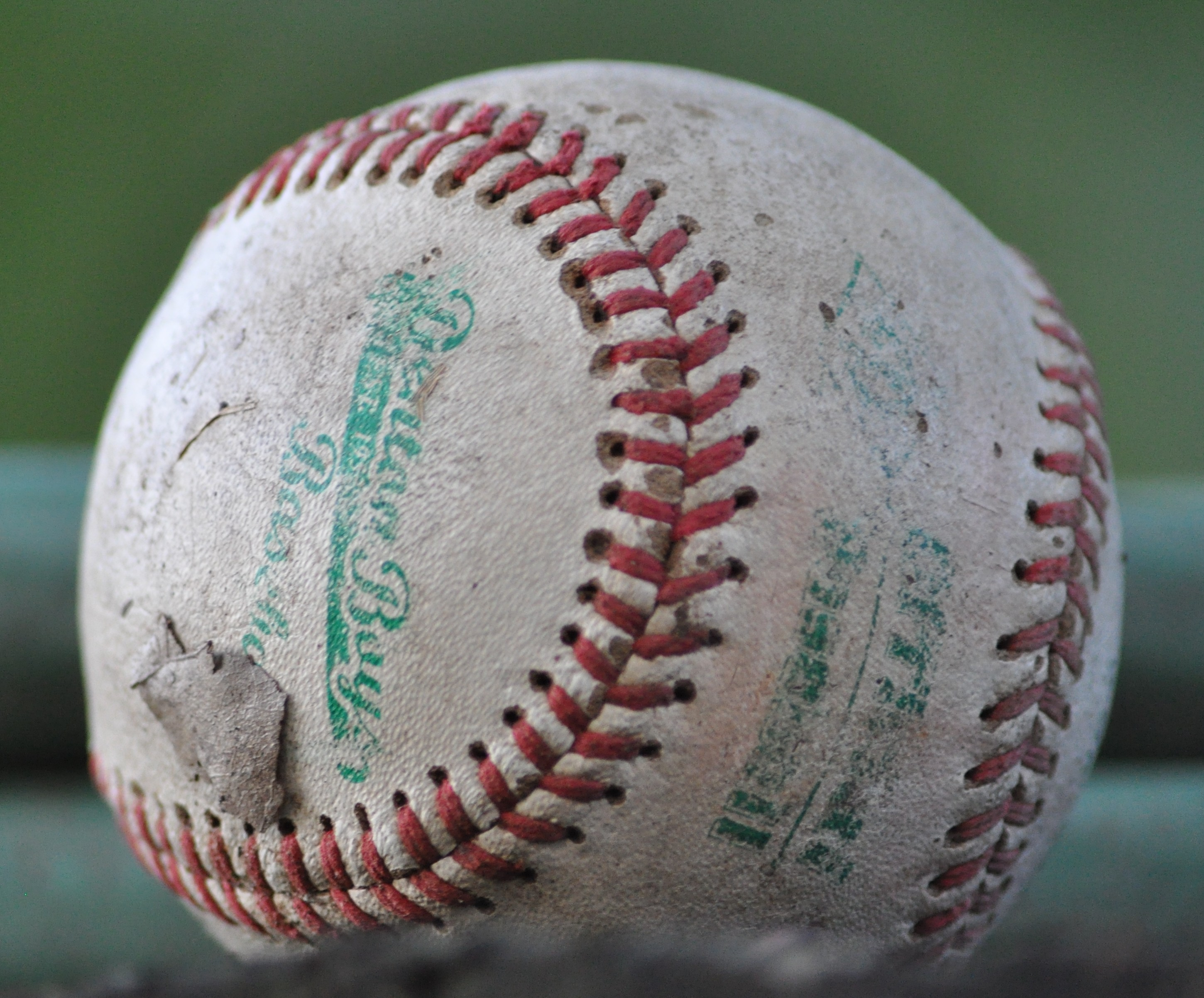
The seam of a baseball follows an unknotted curve with total curvature roughly 4π. By making the curve more convoluted, unknots can be made to have arbitrarily large curvature.

The contrapositive tells us that if K is not an unknot, i.e. K is not isotopic to the circle, then the total curvature will be strictly greater than 4π. Notice that having the total curvature less than or equal to 4π is merely a sufficient condition for K to be an unknot; it is not a necessary condition. In other words, although all knots with total curvature less than or equal to 4π are the unknot, there exist unknots with curvature strictly greater than 4π.

== Generalizations to non-smooth curves ==
For closed polygonal chains the same result holds with the integral of curvature replaced by the sum of angles between adjacent segments of the chain. By approximating arbitrary curves by polygonal chains, one may extend the definition of total curvature to larger classes of curves, within which the Fáry–Milnor theorem also holds (Milnor 1950, Sullivan 2008).
