= Teichmüller space =

Parametrizes complex structures on a surface

In mathematics, the Teichmüller space $T(S)$ of a (real) topological (or differential) surface $S$ is a space that parametrizes complex structures on $S$ up to the action of homeomorphisms that are isotopic to the identity homeomorphism. Teichmüller spaces are named after Oswald Teichmüller.

Each point in a Teichmüller space $T(S)$ may be regarded as an isomorphism class of "marked" Riemann surfaces, where a "marking" is an isotopy class of homeomorphisms from $S$ to itself. It can be viewed as a moduli space for marked hyperbolic structure on the surface, and this endows it with a natural topology for which it is homeomorphic to a ball of dimension $6g-6$ for a surface of genus $g \ge 2$. In this way Teichmüller space can be viewed as the universal covering orbifold of the Riemann moduli space.

The Teichmüller space has a canonical complex manifold structure and a wealth of natural metrics. The study of geometric features of these various structures is an active body of research.

The sub-field of mathematics that studies the Teichmüller space is called Teichmüller theory.

== History ==
Moduli spaces for Riemann surfaces and related Fuchsian groups have been studied since the work of Bernhard Riemann (1826–1866), who knew that $6g-6$ real parameters were needed to describe the variations of complex structures on a surface of genus $g\ge 2$. The early study of Teichmüller space, in the late nineteenth–early twentieth century, was geometric and founded on the interpretation of Riemann surfaces as hyperbolic surfaces. Among the main contributors were Felix Klein, Henri Poincaré, Paul Koebe, Jakob Nielsen, Robert Fricke and Werner Fenchel.

The main contribution of Teichmüller to the study of moduli was the introduction of quasiconformal mappings to the subject. They allow us to give much more depth to the study of moduli spaces by endowing them with additional features that were not present in the previous, more elementary works. After World War II the subject was developed further in this analytic vein, in particular by Lars Ahlfors and Lipman Bers. The theory continues to be active, with numerous studies of the complex structure of Teichmüller space (introduced by Bers).

The geometric vein in the study of Teichmüller space was revived following the work of William Thurston in the late 1970s, who introduced a geometric compactification which he used in his study of the mapping class group of a surface. Other more combinatorial objects associated to this group (in particular the curve complex) have also been related to Teichmüller space, and this is a very active subject of research in geometric group theory.

== Definitions ==
=== Teichmüller space from complex structures ===
Let $S$ be an orientable smooth surface (a differentiable manifold of dimension 2). Informally the Teichmüller space $T(S)$ of $S$ is the space of Riemann surface structures on $S$ up to isotopy.

Formally it can be defined as follows. Two complex structures $X, Y$ on $S$ are said to be equivalent if there is a diffeomorphism $f \in \operatorname{Diff}(S)$ such that:

- It is holomorphic (the differential is complex linear at each point, for the structures $X$ at the source and $Y$ at the target);
- it is isotopic to the identity of $S$ (there is a continuous map $\gamma : [0,1] \to \operatorname{Diff}(S)$ such that $\gamma(0)=f, \gamma(1) = \mathrm{Id}$).

Then $T(S)$ is the space of equivalence classes of complex structures on $S$ for this relation.

Another equivalent definition is as follows: $T(S)$ is the space of pairs $(X, g)$ where $X$ is a Riemann surface and $g: S \to X$ a diffeomorphism, and two pairs $(X, g), (Y,h)$ are regarded as equivalent if $h \circ g^{-1} : X \to Y$ is isotopic to a holomorphic diffeomorphism. Such a pair is called a marked Riemann surface; the marking being the diffeomorphism; another definition of markings is by systems of curves.

There are two simple examples that are immediately computed from the Uniformization theorem: there is a unique complex structure on the sphere $\mathbb S^2$ (see Riemann sphere) and there are two on $\R^2$ (the complex plane and the unit disk) and in each case the group of positive diffeomorphisms is connected. Thus the Teichmüller space of $\mathbb S^2$ is a single point and that of $\R^2$ contains exactly two points.

A slightly more involved example is the open annulus, for which the Teichmüller space is the interval $[0, 1)$ (the complex structure associated to $\lambda$ is the Riemann surface $\{z \in \Complex : \lambda < |z| < \lambda^{-1} \}$).

=== The Teichmüller space of the torus and flat metrics ===
The next example is the torus $\mathbb T^2 = \R^2/\Z^2.$ In this case any complex structure can be realised by a Riemann surface of the form $\Complex/(\Z + \tau\Z)$ (a complex elliptic curve) for a complex number $\tau \in \mathbb{H}$ where

$$\mathbb{H} = \{z \in \Complex : \operatorname{Im}(z) > 0\},$$

is the complex upper half-plane. Then we have a bijection:

$$\mathbb{H} \longrightarrow T(\mathbb T^2)$$
$$\tau \longmapsto (\Complex/(\Z + \tau\Z), (x, y) \mapsto x + \tau y)$$

and thus the Teichmüller space of $\mathbb T^2$ is $\mathbb{H}.$

If we identify $\Complex$ with the Euclidean plane then each point in Teichmüller space can also be viewed as a marked flat structure on $\mathbb T^2.$ Thus the Teichmüller space is in bijection with the set of pairs $(M,f)$ where $M$ is a flat surface and $f: \mathbb T^2 \to M$ is a diffeomorphism up to isotopy on $f$.

=== Finite type surfaces ===
These are the surfaces for which Teichmüller space is most often studied, which include closed surfaces. A surface is of finite type if it is diffeomorphic to a compact surface minus a finite set. If $S$ is a closed surface of genus $g$ then the surface obtained by removing $k$ points from $S$ is usually denoted $S_{g,k}$ and its Teichmüller space by $T_{g,k}.$

=== Teichmüller spaces and hyperbolic metrics ===
Every finite type orientable surface other than the ones above admits complete Riemannian metrics of constant curvature $-1$. For a given surface of finite type there is a bijection between such metrics and complex structures as follows from the uniformisation theorem. Thus if $2g-2+k > 0$ the Teichmüller space $T_{g,k}$ can be realised as the set of marked hyperbolic surfaces of genus $g$ with $k$ cusps, that is the set of pairs $(M, f)$ where $M$ is a hyperbolic surface and $f : S \to M$ is a diffeomorphism, modulo the equivalence relation where $(M, f)$ and $(N, g)$ are identified if $f \circ g^{-1}$ is isotopic to an isometry.

=== The topology on Teichmüller space ===
In all cases computed above there is an obvious topology on Teichmüller space. In the general case there are many natural ways to topologise $T(S)$, perhaps the simplest is via hyperbolic metrics and length functions.

If $\alpha$ is a closed curve on $S$ and $x = (M, f)$ a marked hyperbolic surface then $f_*\alpha$ is homotopic to a unique closed geodesic $\alpha_x$ on $M$ (up to parametrisation). The value at $x$ of the length function associated to (the homotopy class of) $\alpha$ is then:

$$\ell_\alpha(x) = \operatorname{Length}(\alpha_x).$$

Let $\mathcal S$ be the set of simple closed curves on $S$. Then the map

$$T(S) \to \R^{\mathcal S}$$
$$x \mapsto \left (\ell_\alpha(x) \right )_{\alpha\in\mathcal S}$$

is an embedding. The space $\R^{\mathcal S}$ has the product topology and $T(S)$ is endowed with the induced topology. With this topology $T(S_{g,k})$ is homeomorphic to $\R^{6g - 6 + 2k}.$

In fact one can obtain an embedding with $9g-9$ curves, and even $6g - 5 + 2k$. In both cases one can use the embedding to give a geometric proof of the homeomorphism above.

=== More examples of small Teichmüller spaces ===
There is a unique complete hyperbolic metric of finite volume on the three-holed sphere and so the Teichmüller space of finite-volume complete metrics of constant curvature $T(S_{0,3})$ is a point (this also follows from the dimension formula of the previous paragraph).

The Teichmüller spaces $T(S_{0,4})$ and $T(S_{1,1})$ are naturally realised as the upper half-plane, as can be seen using Fenchel–Nielsen coordinates.

=== Teichmüller space and conformal structures ===
Instead of complex structures or hyperbolic metrics one can define Teichmüller space using conformal structures. Indeed, conformal structures are the same as complex structures in two (real) dimensions. Moreover, the Uniformisation Theorem also implies that in each conformal class of Riemannian metrics on a surface there is a unique metric of constant curvature.

=== Teichmüller spaces as representation spaces ===
Yet another interpretation of Teichmüller space is as a representation space for surface groups. If $S$ is hyperbolic, of finite type and $\Gamma = \pi_1(S)$ is the fundamental group of $S$ then Teichmüller space is in natural bijection with:

- The set of injective representations $\Gamma \to \mathrm{PSL}_2(\R)$ with discrete image, up to conjugation by an element of $\mathrm{PSL}_2(\R)$, if $S$ is compact;
- In general, the set of such representations, with the added condition that those elements of $\Gamma$ which are represented by curves freely homotopic to a puncture are sent to parabolic elements of $\mathrm{PSL}_2(\R)$, again up to conjugation by an element of $\mathrm{PSL}_2(\R)$.

The map sends a marked hyperbolic structure $(M, f)$ to the composition $\rho \circ f_*$ where $\rho: \pi_1(M) \to \mathrm{PSL}_2(\R)$ is the monodromy of the hyperbolic structure and $f_*: \pi_1(S) \to \pi_1(M)$ is the isomorphism induced by $f$.

Note that this realises $T(S)$ as a closed subset of $\mathrm{PSL}_2(\R)^{2g+k-1}$ which endows it with a topology. This can be used to see the homeomorphism $T(S) \cong \R^{6g - 6 + 2k}$ directly.

This interpretation of Teichmüller space is generalised by higher Teichmüller theory, where the group $\mathrm{PSL}_2(\R)$ is replaced by an arbitrary semisimple Lie group.

=== A remark on categories ===
All definitions above can be made in the topological category instead of the category of differentiable manifolds, and this does not change the objects.

=== Infinite-dimensional Teichmüller spaces ===
Surfaces which are not of finite type also admit hyperbolic structures, which can be parametrised by infinite-dimensional spaces (homeomorphic to $\R^\N$). Another example of infinite-dimensional space related to Teichmüller theory is the Teichmüller space of a lamination by surfaces.

== Action of the mapping class group and relation to moduli space ==
=== The map to moduli space ===
There is a map from Teichmüller space to the moduli space of Riemann surfaces diffeomorphic to $S$, defined by $(X, f) \mapsto X$. It is a covering map, and since $T(S)$ is simply connected it is the orbifold universal cover for the moduli space.

=== Action of the mapping class group ===
The mapping class group of $S$ is the coset group $MCG(S)$ of the diffeomorphism group of $S$ by the normal subgroup of those that are isotopic to the identity (the same definition can be made with homeomorphisms instead of diffeomorphisms and, for surfaces, this does not change the resulting group). The group of diffeomorphisms acts naturally on Teichmüller space by

$$g \cdot (X, f) \mapsto (X, f \circ g^{-1}).$$

If $\gamma \in MCG(S)$ is a mapping class and $g, h$ two diffeomorphisms representing it then they are isotopic. Thus the classes of $(X, f \circ g^{-1})$ and $(X, f \circ h^{-1})$ are the same in Teichmüller space, and the action above factorises through the mapping class group.

The action of the mapping class group $MCG(S)$ on the Teichmüller space is properly discontinuous, and the quotient is the moduli space.

=== Fixed points ===
The Nielsen realisation problem asks whether any finite subgroup of the mapping class group has a global fixed point (a point fixed by all group elements) in Teichmüller space. In more classical terms the question is: can every finite subgroup of $MCG(S)$ be realised as a group of isometries of some complete hyperbolic metric on $S$ (or equivalently as a group of holomorphic diffeomorphisms of some complex structure). This was solved by Steven Kerckhoff.

== Coordinates ==
=== Fenchel–Nielsen coordinates ===
The Fenchel–Nielsen coordinates (so named after Werner Fenchel and Jakob Nielsen) on the Teichmüller space $T(S)$ are associated to a pants decomposition of the surface $S$. This is a decomposition of $S$ into pairs of pants, and to each curve in the decomposition is associated its length in the hyperbolic metric corresponding to the point in Teichmüller space, and another real parameter called the twist which is more involved to define.

In case of a closed surface of genus $g$ there are $3g - 3$ curves in a pants decomposition and we get $6g-6$ parameters, which is the dimension of $T(S_g)$. The Fenchel–Nielsen coordinates in fact define a homeomorphism $T(S_g) \to \left]0, +\infty\right[^{3g-3} \times \R^{3g-3}$.

In the case of a surface with punctures some pairs of pants are "degenerate" (they have a cusp) and give only two length and twist parameters. Again in this case the Fenchel–Nielsen coordinates define a homeomorphism $T(S_{g, k}) \to \left]0, +\infty\right[^{3g-3 + k} \times \R^{3g-3 + k}$.

=== Shear coordinates ===
If $k > 0$ the surface $S = S_{g,k}$ admits ideal triangulations (whose vertices are exactly the punctures). By the formula for the Euler characteristic such a triangulation has $4g - 4 + 2k$ triangles. A hyperbolic structure $M$ on $S$ determines a (unique up to isotopy) diffeomorphism $S \to M$ sending every triangle to a hyperbolic ideal triangle, thus a point in $T(S)$. The parameters for such a structure are the translation lengths for each pair of sides of the triangles glued in the triangulation. There are $6g - 6 + 3k$ such parameters which can each take any value in $\R$, and the completeness of the structure corresponds to a linear equation and thus we get the right dimension $6g - 6 + 2k$. These coordinates are called shear coordinates.

For closed surfaces, a pair of pants can be decomposed as the union of two ideal triangles (it can be seen as an incomplete hyperbolic metric on the three-holed sphere). Thus we also get $3g - 3$ shear coordinates on $T(S_g)$.

=== Earthquakes ===
A simple earthquake path in Teichmüller space is a path determined by varying a single shear or length Fenchel–Nielsen coordinate (for a fixed ideal triangulation of a surface). The name comes from seeing the ideal triangles or the pants as tectonic plates and the shear as plate motion.

More generally one can do earthquakes along geodesic laminations. A theorem of Thurston then states that two points in Teichmüller space are joined by a unique earthquake path.

== Analytic theory ==
=== Quasiconformal mappings ===
A quasiconformal mapping between two Riemann surfaces is a homeomorphism which deforms the conformal structure in a bounded manner over the surface. More precisely it is differentiable almost everywhere and there is a constant $K \ge 1$, called the dilatation, such that

$$\frac { |f_z| + |f_{\bar z}| } { |f_z| - |f_{\bar z}|} \le K$$

where $f_z, f_{\bar z}$ are the derivatives in a conformal coordinate $z$ and its conjugate $\bar z$.

There are quasi-conformal mappings in every isotopy class and so an alternative definition for The Teichmüller space is as follows. Fix a Riemann surface $X$ diffeomorphic to $S$, and Teichmüller space is in natural bijection with the marked surfaces $(Y, g)$ where $g: X \to Y$ is a quasiconformal mapping, up to the same equivalence relation as above.

=== Quadratic differentials and the Bers embedding ===
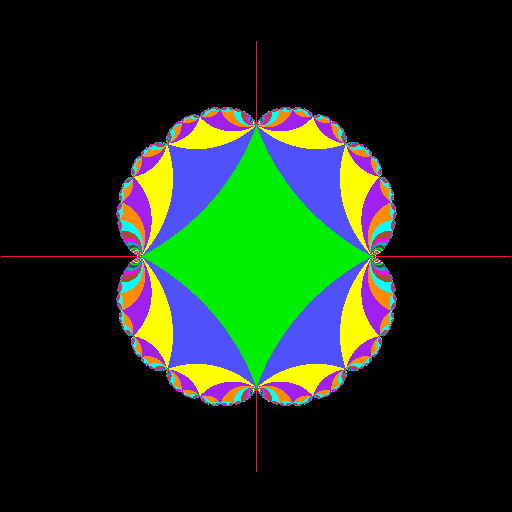
Image of the Bers embedding of a punctured torus's 2-dimensional Teichmüller space

With the definition above, if $X = \Gamma \setminus \mathbb{H}^2$ there is a natural map from Teichmüller space to the space of $\Gamma$-equivariant solutions to the Beltrami differential equation. These give rise, via the Schwarzian derivative, to quadratic differentials on $X$. The space of those is a complex space of complex dimension $3g - 3$, and the image of Teichmüller space is an open set. This map is called the Bers embedding.

A quadratic differential on $X$ can be represented by a translation surface conformal to $X$.

=== Teichmüller mappings ===
Teichmüller's theorem states that between two marked Riemann surfaces $(X, g)$ and $(Y, h)$ there is always a unique quasiconformal mapping $X \to Y$ in the isotopy class of $h \circ g^{-1}$ which has minimal dilatation. This map is called a Teichmüller mapping.

In the geometric picture this means that for every two diffeomorphic Riemann surfaces $X, Y$ and diffeomorphism $f: X \to Y$ there exists two polygons representing $X, Y$ and an affine map sending one to the other, which has smallest dilatation among all quasiconformal maps $X \to Y$.

== Metrics ==
=== The Teichmüller metric ===
If $x, y \in T(S)$ and the Teichmüller mapping between them has dilatation $K$ then the Teichmüller distance between them is by definition $\frac12 \log K$. This indeed defines a distance on $T(S)$ which induces its topology, and for which it is complete. This is the metric most commonly used for the study of the metric geometry of Teichmüller space. In particular it is of interest to geometric group theorists.

There is a function similarly defined, using the Lipschitz constants of maps between hyperbolic surfaces instead of the quasiconformal dilatations, on $T(S) \times T(S)$, which is not symmetric.

=== The Weil–Petersson metric ===
Quadratic differentials on a Riemann surface $X$ are identified with the cotangent space at $(X, f)$ to Teichmüller space. The Weil–Petersson metric is the Riemannian metric defined by the $L^2$ inner product on quadratic differentials.

== Compactifications ==
There are several inequivalent compactifications of Teichmüller spaces that have been studied. Several of the earlier compactifications depend on the choice of a point in Teichmüller space so are not invariant under the modular group, which can be inconvenient. William Thurston later found a compactification without this disadvantage, which has become the most widely used compactification.

=== Thurston compactification ===
By looking at the hyperbolic lengths of simple closed curves for each point in Teichmüller space and taking the closure in the (infinite-dimensional) projective space, Thurston (1988) introduced a compactification whose points at infinity correspond to projective measured laminations. The compactified space is homeomorphic to a closed ball. This Thurston compactification is acted on continuously by the modular group. In particular any element of the modular group has a fixed point in Thurston's compactification, which Thurston used in his classification of elements of the modular group.

=== Bers compactification ===
The Bers compactification is given by taking the closure of the image of the Bers embedding of Teichmüller space, studied by Bers (1970). The Bers embedding depends on the choice of a point in Teichmüller space so is not invariant under the modular group, and in fact the modular group does not act continuously on the Bers compactification.

=== Teichmüller compactification ===
The "points at infinity" in the Teichmüller compactification consist of geodesic rays (for the Teichmüller metric) starting at a fixed basepoint. This compactification depends on the choice of basepoint so is not acted on by the modular group, and in fact Kerckhoff showed that the action of the modular group on Teichmüller space does not extend to a continuous action on this compactification.

=== Gardiner–Masur compactification ===
Gardiner & Masur (1991) considered a compactification similar to the Thurston compactification, but using extremal length rather than hyperbolic length. The modular group acts continuously on this compactification, but they showed that their compactification has strictly more points at infinity.

== Large-scale geometry ==
There has been an extensive study of the geometric properties of Teichmüller space endowed with the Teichmüller metric. Known large-scale properties include:

- Teichmüller space $T(S_{g,k})$ contains flat subspaces of dimension $3g - 3 + k$, and there are no higher-dimensional quasi-isometrically embedded flats.
- In particular, if $g>1$ or $g=1, k>1$ or $g=0, k>4$ then $T(S_{g,k})$ is not hyperbolic.

On the other hand, Teichmüller space exhibits several properties characteristic of hyperbolic spaces, such as:

- Some geodesics behave like they do in hyperbolic space.
- Random walks on Teichmüller space converge almost surely to a point on the Thurston boundary.

Some of these features can be explained by the study of maps from Teichmüller space to the curve complex, which is known to be hyperbolic.

== Complex geometry ==
The Bers embedding gives $T(S)$ a complex structure as an open subset of $\Complex^{3g-3}.$

=== Metrics coming from the complex structure ===
Since Teichmüller space is a complex manifold it carries a Carathéodory metric. Teichmüller space is Kobayashi hyperbolic and its Kobayashi metric coincides with the Teichmüller metric. This latter result is used in Royden's proof that the mapping class group is the full group of isometries for the Teichmüller metric.

The Bers embedding realises Teichmüller space as a domain of holomorphy and hence it also carries a Bergman metric.

=== Kähler metrics on Teichmüller space ===
The Weil–Petersson metric is Kähler but it is not complete.

Cheng and Yau showed that there is a unique complete Kähler–Einstein metric on Teichmüller space. It has constant negative scalar curvature.

Teichmüller space also carries a complete Kähler metric of bounded sectional curvature introduced by McMullen (2000) that is Kähler-hyperbolic.

=== Equivalence of metrics ===
With the exception of the incomplete Weil–Petersson metric, all metrics on Teichmüller space introduced here are quasi-isometric to each other.

== See also ==
- Moduli of algebraic curves
- p-adic Teichmüller theory
- Inter-universal Teichmüller theory
- Teichmüller modular form

== Sources ==
- Ahlfors, Lars V. (2006). Lectures on quasiconformal mappings. Second edition. With supplemental chapters by C. J. Earle, I. Kra, M. Shishikura and J. H. Hubbard. American Math. Soc. pp. viii+162. ISBN 978-0-8218-3644-6.
- Bers, Lipman (1970), "On boundaries of Teichmüller spaces and on Kleinian groups. I", Annals of Mathematics, Second Series, 91 (3): 570–600, doi:10.2307/1970638, JSTOR 1970638, MR 0297992
- Fathi, Albert; Laudenbach, François; Poenaru, Valentin (2012). Thurston's work on surfaces. Princeton University Press. pp. xvi+254. ISBN 978-0-691-14735-2. MR 3053012.
- Gardiner, Frederic P.; Masur, Howard (1991), "Extremal length geometry of Teichmüller space", Complex Variables Theory Appl., 16 (2–3): 209–237, doi:10.1080/17476939108814480, MR 1099913
- Imayoshi, Yôichi; Taniguchi, Masahiko (1992). An introduction to Teichmüller spaces. Springer. pp. xiv+279. ISBN 978-4-431-70088-3.
- Kerckhoff, Steven P. (1983). "The Nielsen realization problem". Annals of Mathematics. Second Series. 117 (2): 235–265. CiteSeerX 10.1.1.353.3593. doi:10.2307/2007076. JSTOR 2007076. MR 0690845.
- McMullen, Curtis T. (2000), "The moduli space of Riemann surfaces is Kähler hyperbolic", Annals of Mathematics, Second Series, 151 (1): 327–357, arXiv:math/0010022, doi:10.2307/121120, JSTOR 121120, MR 1745010, S2CID 8032847
- Ratcliffe, John (2006). Foundations of hyperbolic manifolds, Second edition. Springer. pp. xii+779. ISBN 978-0387-33197-3.
- Thurston, William P. (1988), "On the geometry and dynamics of diffeomorphisms of surfaces", Bulletin of the American Mathematical Society, New Series, 19 (2): 417–431, doi:10.1090/S0273-0979-1988-15685-6, MR 0956596
