= Moss's egg =

Oval made by smoothly connecting four circular arcs

Moss's egg outline

In Euclidean geometry, Moss's egg is an oval made by smoothly connecting four circular arcs. It can be constructed from a right isosceles triangle ABC with apex C.

To construct Moss's egg:

- Draw a semicircle on the base AB of the triangle, outside of the triangle.
- Connect it to a circular arc centered at B from A to a point D on line BC, and by another circular arc centered at A from B to a point E on line AC.
- Complete the oval by a circular arc centered at C, from D to E.
