= Erika Pannwitz =

German mathematician and topologist

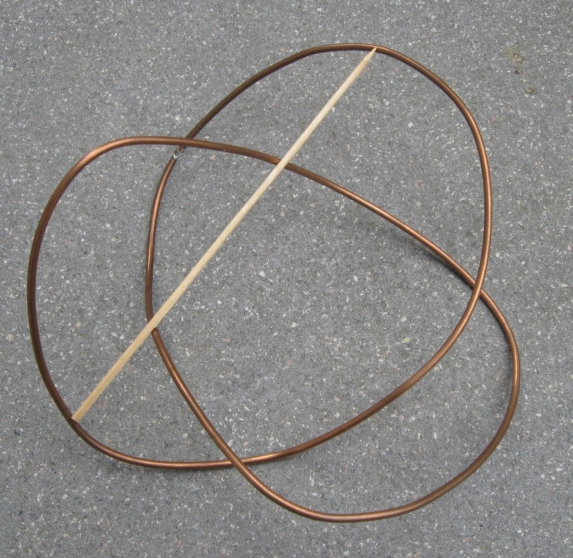
An example of a quadrisecant of a knot (a trefoil)

Erika Pannwitz (May 26, 1904 in Hohenlychen, Germany – November 25, 1975 in Berlin) was a German mathematician who worked in the area of geometric topology. During World War II Pannwitz worked as a cryptanalyst in the Department of Signal Intelligence Agency of the German Foreign Office (German: Auswärtiges Amt) colloquially known as Pers Z S. After the war, she became editor-in-chief of Zentralblatt MATH.

== Education ==
Erika Pannwitz attended the Pannwitz Outdoor School in Hohenlychen until 10th grade, and graduated from Augusta State School in Berlin in 1922. She studied mathematics in Berlin, and also for a semester in Freiburg (1925) and Göttingen (1928). After passing her teaching exam in 1927 (in mathematics, physics, and chemistry), Pannwitz was promoted in 1931 to Dr Phil at Friedrich Wilhelms University with doctoral advisors Heinz Hopf and Erhard Schmidt. Her thesis titled: Eine elementargeometrische Eigenschaft von Verschlingungen und Knoten (An elementary geometric property of entanglements and knots), which appeared two years later in the prestigious journal Mathematische Annalen, was honored opus eximium being considered an outstanding thesis. Both doctoral advisors wrote extraordinary statements about the thesis. Hopf in particular wrote eight pages of comments and left a summary quoted below:

The author has thus completely solved a difficult concrete problem posed to her through completely independent investigations; she has achieved this goal through the appropriate choice of new terms, through understanding and deep insight into the difficult material presented to her, through the mastery of older methods and their novel use, and has thus demonstrated her scientific maturity in this, her first dissertation.

Since, in my opinion, both the objective scientific value of this work and the subjective achievement in it exceed the level of good dissertations, I ask the faculty to accept the work submitted by Miss Pannwitz as a dissertation with the rating "eximium".

Schmidt also wrote an extraordinary statement on the thesis:

I certainly agree with Mr Hopf's vote. Topology is one of the most promising but at the same time most difficult areas of mathematics, because the methodological-technical apparatus is still in its infancy, so that any valuable result can only be achieved with a high degree of strong inventiveness. Through the present work, topology has been enriched by a series of extraordinarily beautiful theorems

In her thesis, she established that every piecewise linear knot in general position (other than the unknot) has a quadrisecant, i.e., four collinear points. The topic was suggested to her by Otto Toeplitz.

== Career ==
In September 1930, Pannwitz became an editor of Jahrbuch über die Fortschritte der Mathematik. This was due to the difficulty of women achieving an academic career in the 1930's, who found their career path blocked into higher education. It was also due to Pannwitz along with many other German mathematicians not wanting to provide support to the Nazis, despite her excellent dissertation. From 1940 to 1945, she worked in the cryptography service (with Helmut Grunsky) as part of the war effort. After Germany's defeat in World War II, she briefly held an assistant position at Marburg University. In 1946, she returned to Berlin to work as an editor for Zentralblatt für Mathematik, and after the death of its previous editor-in-chief, Hermann Ludwig Schmid, in 1956, she became editor-in-chief. Travel to work was awkward, especially after the construction of the Berlin Wall in 1961, because she lived in West Berlin and had to pass through checkpoints to reach the Zentralblatt offices in East Berlin. East Germany at that time had mandatory retirement at age 60, which she reached in 1964. From 1964 until her retirement in 1969 she worked at the Zentralblatt office in West Berlin.

Although Pannwitz had written what was considered an outstanding thesis, throughout her career, she never held a regular academic position. The reasons for this are unknown, but there could have been some element of discrimination, perhaps due to her gender or politics or both.

== Publications ==
- Eine elementargeometrische Eigenschaft von Verschlingungen und Knoten., Math. Annalen. Volume 108, 1933, pp. 629–672, online
- With Heinz Hopf: Über stetige Deformationen von Komplexen in sich., Math. Annalen. Volume 108, 1933, pp. 433–465
- Eine freie Abbildung der n-dimensionalen Sphäre in die Ebene. [A free map from the n-dimensional sphere to the plane] In: Mathematische Nachrichten. Volume 7, 1952, pp. 183–185
