= Jakob Nielsen (mathematician) =

Danish mathematician

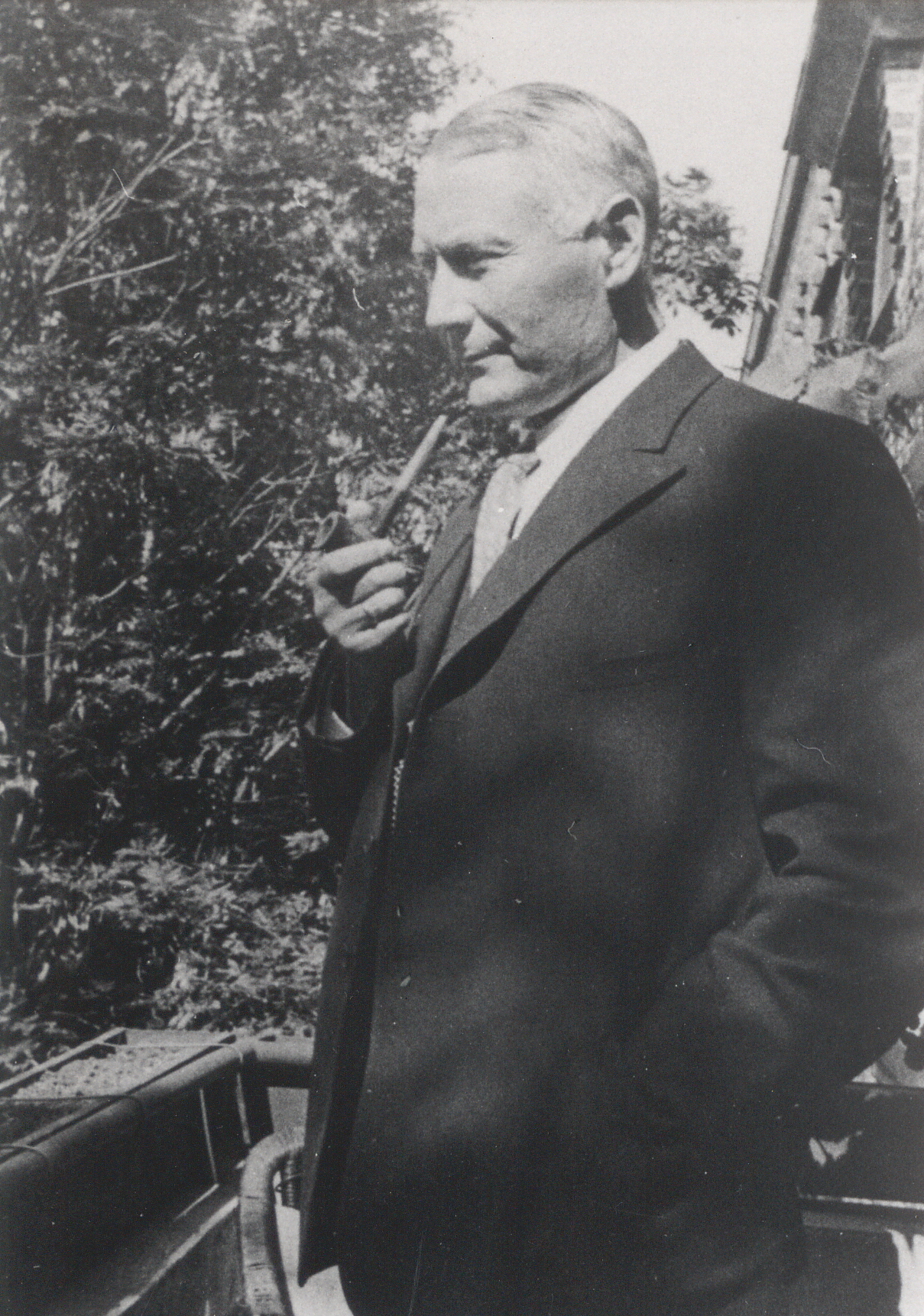
Jakob Nielsen

Jakob Nielsen (15 October 1890 in Mjels, Als – 3 August 1959 in Helsingør) was a Danish mathematician known for his work on automorphisms of surfaces. He was born in the village Mjels on the island of Als in North Schleswig, in modern-day Denmark. His mother died when he was 3, and in 1900 he went to live with his aunt and was enrolled in the Realgymnasium. In 1907 he was expelled for being a member of an illicit student club. Nevertheless, he matriculated at the University of Kiel in 1908.

Nielsen completed his doctoral dissertation in 1913. Soon thereafter, he was drafted into the German Imperial Navy. He was assigned to coastal defense. In 1915 he was sent to Constantinople as a military adviser to the Turkish Government. After the war, in the spring of 1919, Nielsen married Carola von Pieverling, a German medical doctor.

In 1920 Nielsen took a position at the Technical University of Breslau. The next year he published a paper in Mathematisk Tidsskrift in which he proved that any subgroup of a finitely generated free group is free. In 1926 Otto Schreier would generalize this result by removing the condition that the free group be finitely generated; this result is now known as the Nielsen–Schreier theorem. Also in 1921 Nielsen moved to the Royal Veterinary and Agricultural University in Copenhagen, where he would stay until 1925, when he moved to the Technical University in Copenhagen. He also proved the Dehn–Nielsen theorem on mapping class groups.

Nielsen was a Plenary Speaker of the ICM in 1936 in Oslo.

During World War II some efforts were made to bring Nielsen to the United States as it was feared that he would be assaulted by the Nazis. Nielsen would, in fact, stay in Denmark during the war without being harassed by the Nazis.

In 1951 Nielsen became professor of mathematics at the University of Copenhagen, taking the position vacated by the death of Harald Bohr. He resigned this position in 1955 because of his international undertakings, in particular with UNESCO, where he served on the executive board from 1952 to 1958.

== Bibliography ==
- Fenchel, Werner; Nielsen, Jakob (2003), Schmidt, Asmus L. (ed.), Discontinuous groups of isometries in the hyperbolic plane, De Gruyter Studies in mathematics, vol. 29, Berlin: Walter de Gruyter & Co. 2011 pbk edition
- Nielsen, Jakob (1986), Hansen, Vagn Lundsgaard (ed.), Jakob Nielsen: collected mathematical papers. Vol. 1, Contemporary Mathematicians, Boston, MA: Birkhäuser Boston, ISBN 978-0-8176-3140-6, MR 0865335
- Nielsen, Jakob (1986), Hansen, Vagn Lundsgaard (ed.), Jakob Nielsen: collected mathematical papers. Vol. 2, Contemporary Mathematicians, Boston, MA: Birkhäuser Boston, ISBN 978-0-8176-3151-2, MR 0865336
- O'Connor, John J.; Robertson, Edmund F., "Jakob Nielsen", MacTutor History of Mathematics Archive, University of St Andrews

== See also ==
- Fenchel–Nielsen coordinates
- Nielsen transformation
- Nielsen theory
- Nielsen–Thurston classification
- Nielsen realization problem
