= Total curvature =

2π times turning number of a curve

This curve has total curvature 6π, and index/turning number 3, though it only has winding number 2 about p.

In mathematical study of the differential geometry of curves, the total curvature of an immersed plane curve is the integral of curvature along a curve taken with respect to arc length:

$$\int_a^b k(s)\,ds = 2\pi N.$$

The total curvature of a closed curve is always an integer multiple of 2π, where N is called the index of the curve or turning number – it is the winding number of the unit tangent vector about the origin, or equivalently the degree of the map to the unit circle assigning to each point of the curve, the unit tangent vector at that point (a kind of Gauss map).

== Comparison to surfaces ==
This relationship between a local geometric invariant, the curvature, and a global topological invariant, the index, is characteristic of results in higher-dimensional Riemannian geometry such as the Gauss–Bonnet theorem.

== Invariance ==
According to the Whitney–Graustein theorem, the total curvature is invariant under a regular homotopy of a curve: it is the degree of the Gauss map. However, it is not invariant under homotopy: passing through a kink (cusp) changes the turning number by 1.

By contrast, winding number about a point is invariant under homotopies that do not pass through the point, and changes by 1 if one passes through the point.

== Generalizations ==
A closed polygonal chain, with total curvature 2π.

A finite generalization is that the exterior angles of a triangle, or more generally any simple polygon, add up to 360° = 2π radians, corresponding to a turning number of 1. More generally, polygonal chains that do not go back on themselves (no 180° angles) have well-defined total curvature, interpreting the curvature as point masses at the angles.

The total absolute curvature of a curve is defined in almost the same way as the total curvature, but using the absolute value of the curvature instead of the signed curvature. It is 2π for convex curves in the plane, and larger for non-convex curves. It can also be generalized to curves in higher dimensional spaces by flattening out the tangent developable to γ into a plane, and computing the total curvature of the resulting curve. That is, the total curvature of a curve in n-dimensional space is

$$\int_a^b \left|\gamma''(s)\right|\sgn \kappa_{n-1}(s)\,ds$$

where κ_{n−1} is last Frenet curvature (the torsion of the curve) and sgn is the signum function.

The minimum total absolute curvature of any three-dimensional curve representing a given knot is an invariant of the knot. This invariant has the value 2π for the unknot, but by the Fáry–Milnor theorem it is at least 4π for any other knot.
