= Arithmetic Fuchsian group =

Type of mathematical group

Arithmetic Fuchsian groups are a special class of Fuchsian groups constructed using orders in quaternion algebras. They are particular instances of arithmetic groups. The prototypical example of an arithmetic Fuchsian group is the modular group $\mathrm{PSL}_2(\Z )$. They, and the hyperbolic surface associated to their action on the hyperbolic plane, often exhibit particularly regular behaviour among Fuchsian groups and hyperbolic surfaces.

== Definition and examples ==
=== Quaternion algebras ===
A quaternion algebra over a field $F$ is a four-dimensional central simple $F$-algebra. A quaternion algebra has a basis $1, i, j, ij$, where $i^2, j^2 \in F^\times$ and $ij = -ji$.

A quaternion algebra is said to be split over $F$ if it is isomorphic as an $F$-algebra to the algebra of matrices $M_2(F)$.

If $\sigma$ is an embedding of $F$ into a field $E$, then we denote by $A \otimes_\sigma E$ the algebra obtained by extending scalars from $F$ to $E$, where we view $F$ as a subfield of $E$ via $\sigma$.

=== Arithmetic Fuchsian groups ===
A subgroup of $\mathrm{PSL}_2(\R)$ is said to be derived from a quaternion algebra if it can be obtained through the following construction. Let $F$ be a totally real number field and $A$ a quaternion algebra over $F$ satisfying the following conditions. First there is a unique embedding $\sigma: F \hookrightarrow \R$ such that $A \otimes_\sigma \R$ is split over $\R$; we denote by $\phi : A \otimes_\sigma \R \to M_2(\R)$ an isomorphism of $\R$-algebras. We also ask that for all other embeddings $\tau$ the algebra $A \otimes_\tau \R$ is not split (this is equivalent to its being isomorphic to the Hamilton quaternions). Next we need an order $\mathcal O$ in $A$. Let $\mathcal O^1$ be the group of elements in $\mathcal O$ of reduced norm 1 and let $\Gamma$ be its image in $M_2(\R )$ via $\phi$. Then the image of $\Gamma$ is a subgroup of $\mathrm{SL}_2(\R )$ (since the reduced norm of a matrix algebra is just the determinant) and we can consider the Fuchsian group which is its image in $\mathrm{PSL}_2(\R)$.

The main fact about these groups is that they are discrete subgroups and they have finite covolume for the Haar measure on $\mathrm{PSL}_2(\R).$ Moreover, the construction above yields a cocompact subgroup if and only if the algebra $A$ is not split over $F$. The discreteness is a rather immediate consequence of the fact that $A$ is only split at one real embedding. The finiteness of covolume is harder to prove.

An arithmetic Fuchsian group is any subgroup of $\mathrm{PSL}_2(\R)$ which is commensurable to a group derived from a quaternion algebra. It follows immediately from this definition that arithmetic Fuchsian groups are discrete and of finite covolume (this means that they are lattices in $\mathrm{PSL}_2(\R)$).

=== Examples ===
The simplest example of an arithmetic Fuchsian group is the modular $\mathrm{PSL}_2(\Z),$ which is obtained by the construction above with $A = M_2(\Q)$ and $\mathcal O = M_2(\Z).$ By taking Eichler orders in $A$ we obtain subgroups $\Gamma_0(N)$ for $N \geqslant 2$ of finite index in $\mathrm{PSL}_2(\Z)$ which can be explicitly written as follows:

$$\Gamma_0(N) = \left\{ \begin{pmatrix} a & b \\ c & d \end{pmatrix} \in \mathrm{PSL}_2(\Z) :  c = 0 \pmod N \right\}.$$

The arithmeticity of such subgroups follows from the fact that they have finite-index in the arithmetic group $\mathrm{PSL}_2(\Z )$; they belong to a more general class of finite-index subgroups, namely congruence subgroups.

Any order in a quaternion algebra over $\Q$ which is not split over $\Q$ but splits over $\R$ yields a cocompact arithmetic Fuchsian group. There is a plentiful supply of such algebras.

More generally, all orders in quaternion algebras (satisfying the above conditions) which are not $M_2(\Q)$ yield cocompact subgroups. A further example of particular interest is obtained by taking $A$ to be the Hurwitz quaternions.

=== Maximal subgroups ===
A natural question is to identify those among arithmetic Fuchsian groups which are not strictly contained in a larger discrete subgroup. These are called maximal Kleinian groups, and it is possible to give a complete classification in a given arithmetic commensurability class. A theorem of Margulis implies that a lattice in $\mathrm{PSL}_2(\Complex)$ is arithmetic if and only if it is commensurable to infinitely many maximal Kleinian groups.

=== Congruence subgroups ===
A principal congruence subgroup of $\Gamma = \mathrm{SL}_2(\Z)$ is a subgroup of the form

$$\Gamma(N) =  \left\{ \begin{pmatrix} a & b \\ c & d \end{pmatrix} \in \mathrm{PSL}_2(\Z) : a,d = 1 \pmod N, \, b,c = 0 \pmod N  \right\}$$

for some $N \geqslant 1.$ These are finite-index normal subgroups, and the quotient $\Gamma/\Gamma(N)$ is isomorphic to the finite group $\mathrm{SL}_2(\Z /N\Z).$ A congruence subgroup of $\Gamma$ is by definition a subgroup which contains a principal congruence subgroup (these are the groups which are defined by taking the matrices in $\Gamma$ which satisfy certain congruences modulo an integer, hence the name).

Notably, not all finite-index subgroups of $\mathrm{SL}_2(\Z)$ are congruence subgroups. A nice way to see this is to observe that $\mathrm{SL}_2(\Z)$ has subgroups which surject onto the alternating group $A_n$ for arbitrary $n,$ and since for large $n$ the group $A_n$ is not a subgroup of $\mathrm{SL}_2(\Z/N \Z)$ for any $N$, these subgroups cannot be congruence subgroups. In fact there are many more non-congruence than congruence subgroups in $\mathrm{SL}_2(\Z)$.

The notion of a congruence subgroup generalizes to cocompact arithmetic Fuchsian groups, and the results above also hold in this general setting.

=== Construction via quadratic forms ===
There is an isomorphism between $\mathrm{PSL}_2(\R)$ and the connected component of the orthogonal group $\mathrm{SO}(2,1)$ given by the action of the former by conjugation on the space of matrices of trace zero, on which the determinant induces the structure of a real quadratic space of signature (2,1). Arithmetic Fuchsian groups can be constructed directly in the latter group by taking the integral points in the orthogonal group associated to quadratic forms defined over number fields (and satisfying certain conditions).

In this correspondence, the modular group is associated up to commensurability to the group $\mathrm{SO}(2,1)(\Z).$

=== Arithmetic Kleinian groups ===
The construction above can be adapted to obtain subgroups in $\mathrm{PSL}_2(\Complex)$: instead of asking for $F$ to be totally real and $A$ to be split at exactly one real embedding, one asks for $F$ to have exactly one complex embedding up to complex conjugacy, at which $A$ is automatically split, and that $A$ is not split at any embedding $F \hookrightarrow \R$. The subgroups of $\mathrm{PSL}_2(\Complex)$ commensurable to those obtained by this construction are called arithmetic Kleinian groups. As in the Fuchsian case, arithmetic Kleinian groups are discrete subgroups of finite covolume.

== Trace fields of arithmetic Fuchsian groups ==
The invariant trace field of a Fuchsian group (or, through the monodromy image of the fundamental group, of a hyperbolic surface) is the field generated by the traces of the squares of its elements. In the case of an arithmetic surface whose fundamental group is commensurable with a Fuchsian group derived from a quaternion algebra over a number field $F$, the invariant trace field equals $F$.

One can characterise arithmetic manifolds through the traces of the elements of their fundamental group, a result known as Takeuchi's criterion. A Fuchsian group is an arithmetic group if and only if the following three conditions are realised:

- Its invariant trace field $F$ is a totally real number field;
- The traces of its elements are algebraic integers;
- There is an embedding $\sigma: F \to \R$ such that for any $\gamma$ in the group, $t=\mathrm{Trace}(\gamma^2)$ and for any other embedding $\sigma \neq \sigma': F \to \R$ we have $|\sigma'(t)| \leqslant 2$.

== Geometry of arithmetic hyperbolic surfaces ==
The Lie group $\mathrm{PSL}_2(\R)$ is the group of positive isometries of the hyperbolic plane $\mathbb H^2$. Thus, if $\Gamma$ is a discrete subgroup of $\mathrm{PSL}_2(\R)$, then $\Gamma$ acts properly discontinuously on $\mathbb H^2$. If moreover $\Gamma$ is torsion-free, then the action is free and the quotient space $\Gamma \setminus \mathbb H^2$ is a surface (a 2-manifold) with a hyperbolic metric (a Riemannian metric of constant sectional curvature −1). If $\Gamma$ is an arithmetic Fuchsian group, then such a surface $S$ is called an arithmetic hyperbolic surface (not to be confused with the arithmetic surfaces from arithmetic geometry; however, when the context is clear the "hyperbolic" specifier may be omitted). Since arithmetic Fuchsian groups are of finite covolume, arithmetic hyperbolic surfaces always have finite Riemannian volume (i.e. the integral over $S$ of the volume form is finite).

=== Volume formula and finiteness ===
It is possible to give a formula for the volume of distinguished arithmetic surfaces from the arithmetic data with which it was constructed. Let $\mathcal O$ be a maximal order in the quaternion algebra $A$ of discriminant $D_A$ over the field $F$, let $r = [F : \Q]$ be its degree, $D_F$ its discriminant, and $\zeta_F$ its Dedekind zeta function. Let $\Gamma_{\mathcal O}$ be the arithmetic group obtained from $\mathcal O$ by the procedure above and $S$ the orbifold $\Gamma_{\mathcal O} \setminus \mathbb H^2$. Its volume is computed by the formula

$$\operatorname{vol}(S) =  \frac {2 |D_F|^{\frac 3 2} \cdot \zeta_F(2)} {(2\pi)^{2r - 2}} \cdot \prod_{\mathfrak p \mid D_A} (N(\mathfrak p) - 1).$$

The product is taken over prime ideals of $O_F$ dividing $(D_A)$, and $N(\cdot)$ is the norm function on ideals, i.e. $N(\mathfrak p)$ is the cardinality of the finite ring $O_F /\mathfrak p$. If $\mathcal O = M_2(\Z)$, then the output of this formula recovers the well-known result that the hyperbolic volume of the modular surface equals $\pi/3$.

Coupled with the description of maximal subgroups and finiteness results for number fields, this formula allows one to prove the following statement:

Given any $V > 0$, there are only finitely many arithmetic surfaces whose volume is less than $V$.

Note that in dimensions ≥ 4, Wang's finiteness theorem (a consequence of local rigidity) asserts that this statement remains true by replacing "arithmetic" by "finite volume". An asymptotic equivalent for the number of arithmetic manifolds of a certain volume was given by Belolipetsky–Gelander–Lubotzky–Mozes.

=== Minimal volume ===
The hyperbolic orbifold of minimal volume can be obtained as the surface associated to a particular order, the Hurwitz quaternion order, and it is compact of volume $\pi/21$.

=== Closed geodesics and injectivity radii ===
A closed geodesic on a Riemannian manifold is a closed curve that is also geodesic. One can give an effective description of the set of such curves in an arithmetic surface or 3-manifold: they correspond to certain units in certain quadratic extensions of the base field (the description is lengthy and shall not be given in full here). For example, the length of primitive closed geodesics in the modular surface corresponds to the absolute value of units of norm one in real quadratic fields. This description was used by Sarnak to establish a conjecture of Gauss on the mean order of class groups of real quadratic fields.

Arithmetic surfaces can be used to construct families of surfaces of genus $g$ for any $g$ which satisfy the (optimal, up to a constant) systolic inequality

$$\operatorname{sys}(S) \geqslant \frac{4}{3} \log g.$$

== Spectra of arithmetic hyperbolic surfaces ==
=== Laplace eigenvalues and eigenfunctions ===
If $S$ is a hyperbolic surface, then there is a distinguished operator $\Delta$ on smooth functions on $S$. In the case where $S$ is compact it extends to an unbounded, essentially self-adjoint operator on the Hilbert space $L^2(S)$ of square-integrable functions on $S$. The spectral theorem in Riemannian geometry states that there exists an orthonormal basis $\phi_0, \phi_1, \ldots, \phi_n, \ldots$ of eigenfunctions for $\Delta$. The associated eigenvalues $\lambda_0 = 0 < \lambda_1 \leqslant \lambda_2 \leqslant \cdots$ are unbounded and their asymptotic behaviour is ruled by Weyl's law.

In the case where $S = \Gamma \setminus \mathbb H^2$ is arithmetic, these eigenfunctions are a special type of automorphic forms for $\Gamma$ called Maass forms. The eigenvalues of $\Delta$ are of interest for number theorists, as well as the distribution and nodal sets of the $\phi_n$.

The case where $S$ is of finite volume is more complicated, but a similar theory can be established via the notion of cusp form.

=== Selberg conjecture ===
The spectral gap of the surface $S$ is by definition the gap between the smallest eigenvalue $\lambda_0 = 0$ and the second smallest eigenvalue $\lambda_1 > 0$; thus its value equals $\lambda_1$, and we shall denote it by $\lambda_1(S).$ In general it can be made arbitrarily small (ref Randol) (however, it has a positive lower bound for a surface with fixed volume). The Selberg conjecture is the following statement providing a conjectural uniform lower bound in the arithmetic case:

If $\Gamma \subset \mathrm{PSL}_2(\R)$ is a lattice which is derived from a quaternion algebra and $\Gamma'$ is a torsion-free congruence subgroup of $\Gamma,$ then for $S = \Gamma' \setminus \mathbb H^2$ we have $\lambda_1(S) \geqslant \tfrac{1}{4}.$

The statement is only valid for a subclass of arithmetic surfaces and can be seen to be false for general subgroups of finite index in lattices derived from quaternion algebras. Selberg's original statement was made only for congruence covers of the modular surface, and it has been verified for some small groups. Selberg himself proved the lower bound $\lambda_1 \geqslant \tfrac{1}{16},$ a result known as Selberg's 1/16 theorem. The best known result in full generality is due to Luo–Rudnick–Sarnak.

The uniformity of the spectral gap has implications for the construction of expander graphs as Schreier graphs of $\mathrm{SL}_2(\Z).$

=== Relations with geometry ===
Selberg's trace formula shows that, for a hyperbolic surface of finite volume, it is equivalent to know the length spectrum (the collection of lengths of all closed geodesics on $S$, with multiplicities) and the spectrum of $\Delta$. However, the precise relation is not explicit.

Another relation between spectrum and geometry is given by Cheeger's inequality, which in the case of a surface $S$ states roughly that a positive lower bound on the spectral gap of $S$ translates into a positive lower bound for the total length of a collection of smooth closed curves separating $S$ into two connected components.

=== Quantum ergodicity ===
The quantum ergodicity theorem of Alexander Shnirelmann, Yves Colin de Verdière, and Steven Zelditch states that on average, eigenfunctions equidistribute on $S$. The unique quantum ergodicity conjecture of Zeev Rudnick and Peter Sarnak asks whether the stronger statement that individual eigenfunctions equidistribute is true. Formally, the statement is as follows.

Let $S$ be an arithmetic surface and $\phi_j$ be a sequence of functions on $S$ such that

$$\Delta\phi_j = \lambda_j\phi_j, \qquad \int_S \phi_j(x)^2 \,dx = 1.$$

Then for any smooth, compactly supported function $\psi$ on $S$ we have

$$\lim_{j\to \infty} \left( \int_S \psi(x) \phi_j(x)^2 \,dx \right) = \int_S \psi(x)\,dx.$$

This conjecture was proved by Elon Lindenstrauss in the case where $S$ is compact and the $\phi_j$ are additionally eigenfunctions for the Hecke operators on $S$. In the case of congruence covers of the modular some additional difficulties occur, which were dealt with by Kannan Soundararajan.

=== Isospectral surfaces ===
The fact that for arithmetic surfaces the arithmetic data determines the spectrum of the Laplace operator $\Delta$ was pointed out by Marie-France Vignéras and used by her to construct examples of isospectral compact hyperbolic surfaces. The precise statement is as follows:

If $A$ is a quaternion algebra, $\mathcal O_1, \mathcal O_2$ are maximal orders in $A$, and the associated Fuchsian groups $\Gamma_1,\Gamma_2$ are torsion-free, then the hyperbolic surfaces $S_i = \Gamma_i \setminus \mathbb H^2$ have the same Laplace spectrum.

Vignéras then constructed explicit instances for $A, \mathcal O_1, \mathcal O_2$ satisfying the conditions above and such that in addition $\mathcal O_2$ is not conjugated by an element of $A$ to $\mathcal O_1$. The resulting isospectral hyperbolic surfaces are then not isometric.
