= Arithmetic hyperbolic 3-manifold =

In mathematics, more precisely in group theory and hyperbolic geometry, Arithmetic Kleinian groups are a special class of Kleinian groups constructed using orders in quaternion algebras. They are particular instances of arithmetic groups. An arithmetic hyperbolic three-manifold is the quotient of hyperbolic space $\mathbb H^3$ by an arithmetic Kleinian group.

== Definition and examples ==
=== Quaternion algebras ===
A quaternion algebra over a field $F$ is a four-dimensional central simple $F$-algebra. A quaternion algebra has a basis $1, i, j, ij$ where $i^2, j^2 \in F^\times$ and $ij = -ji$.

A quaternion algebra is said to be split over $F$ if it is isomorphic as an $F$-algebra to the algebra of matrices $M_2(F)$; a quaternion algebra over an algebraically closed field is always split.

If $\sigma$ is an embedding of $F$ into a field $E$ we shall denote by $A \otimes_\sigma E$ the algebra obtained by extending scalars from $F$ to $E$ where we view $F$ as a subfield of $E$ via $\sigma$.

=== Arithmetic Kleinian groups ===
A subgroup of $\mathrm{PGL}_2(\Complex)$ is said to be derived from a quaternion algebra if it can be obtained through the following construction. Let $F$ be a number field which has exactly two embeddings into $\Complex$ whose image is not contained in $\Reals$ (one conjugate to the other). Let $A$ be a quaternion algebra over $F$ such that for any embedding $\tau: F \to \Reals$ the algebra $A \otimes_\tau \Reals$ is isomorphic to the Hamilton quaternions. Next we need an order $\mathcal O$ in $A$. Let $\mathcal O^1$ be the group of elements in $\mathcal O$ of reduced norm 1 and let $\Gamma$ be its image in $M_2(\Complex)$ via $\phi$. We then consider the Kleinian group obtained as the image in $\mathrm{PGL}_2(\Complex)$ of $\phi(\mathcal O^1)$.

The main fact about these groups is that they are discrete subgroups and they have finite covolume for the Haar measure on $\mathrm{PGL}_2(\Complex)$. Moreover, the construction above yields a cocompact subgroup if and only if the algebra $A$ is not split over $F$. The discreteness is a rather immediate consequence of the fact that $A$ is only split at its complex embeddings. The finiteness of covolume is harder to prove.

An arithmetic Kleinian group is any subgroup of $\mathrm{PGL}_2(\Complex)$ which is commensurable to a group derived from a quaternion algebra. It follows immediately from this definition that arithmetic Kleinian groups are discrete and of finite covolume (this means that they are lattices in $\mathrm{PGL}_2(\Complex)$).

=== Examples ===
Examples are provided by taking $F$ to be an imaginary quadratic field, $A = M_2(F)$ and $\mathcal O = M_2(O_F)$ where $O_F$ is the ring of integers of $F$ (for example $F = \Q(i)$ and $O_F = \Z[i]$). The groups thus obtained are the Bianchi groups. They are not cocompact, and any arithmetic Kleinian group which is not commensurable to a conjugate of a Bianchi group is cocompact.

If $A$ is any quaternion algebra over an imaginary quadratic number field $F$ which is not isomorphic to a matrix algebra then the unit groups of orders in $A$ are cocompact.

== Trace field of arithmetic manifolds ==
The invariant trace field of a Kleinian group (or, through the monodromy image of the fundamental group, of an hyperbolic manifold) is the field generated by the traces of the squares of its elements. In the case of an arithmetic manifold whose fundamental groups is commensurable with that of a manifold derived from a quaternion algebra over a number field $F$ the invariant trace field equals $F$.

One can in fact characterise arithmetic manifolds through the traces of the elements of their fundamental group. A Kleinian group is an arithmetic group if and only if the following three conditions are realised:

- Its invariant trace field $F$ is a number field with exactly one complex place;
- The traces of its elements are algebraic integers;
- For any $\gamma$ in the group, $t=\mathrm{Trace}(\gamma^2)$ and any embedding $\sigma: F \to \R$ we have $|\sigma(t)| \le 2$.

== Geometry and spectrum of arithmetic hyperbolic three-manifolds ==
=== Volume formula ===
For the volume of an arithmetic three manifold $M = \Gamma_{\mathcal O} \backslash \mathbb H^3$ derived from a maximal order in a quaternion algebra $A$ over a number field $F$, we have this formula:
$$\mathrm{vol}(M) =  \frac {2 |D_F|^{\frac 3 2} \cdot \zeta_F(2)} {2^{2r + 1} \cdot \pi^{2r}} \cdot \prod_{\mathfrak p | D_A} (N(\mathfrak p) - 1).$$
where $D_A,D_F$ are the discriminants of $A, F$ respectively; $\zeta_F$ is the Dedekind zeta function of $F$; and $r = [F:\Q]$.

=== Finiteness results ===
A consequence of the volume formula in the previous paragraph is that

Given $v > 0$ there are at most finitely many arithmetic hyperbolic 3-manifolds with volume less than $v$.

This is in contrast with the fact that hyperbolic Dehn surgery can be used to produce infinitely many non-isometric hyperbolic 3-manifolds with bounded volume. In particular, a corollary is that given a cusped hyperbolic manifold, at most finitely many Dehn surgeries on it can yield an arithmetic hyperbolic manifold.

=== Remarkable arithmetic hyperbolic three-manifolds ===
The Weeks manifold is the hyperbolic three-manifold of smallest volume and the Meyerhoff manifold is the one of next smallest volume.

The complement in the three-sphere of the figure-eight knot is an arithmetic hyperbolic three-manifold and attains the smallest volume among all cusped hyperbolic three-manifolds.

=== Spectrum and Ramanujan conjectures ===
The Ramanujan conjecture for automorphic forms on $\mathrm{GL}(2)$ over a number field would imply that for any congruence cover of an arithmetic three-manifold (derived from a quaternion algebra) the spectrum of the Laplace operator is contained in $[1, +\infty)$.

== Arithmetic manifolds in three-dimensional topology ==
Many of Thurston's conjectures (for example the virtually Haken conjecture), now all known to be true following the work of Ian Agol, were checked first for arithmetic manifolds by using specific methods. In some arithmetic cases the Virtual Haken conjecture is known by general means but it is not known if its solution can be arrived at by purely arithmetic means (for instance, by finding a congruence subgroup with positive first Betti number).

Arithmetic manifolds can be used to give examples of manifolds with large injectivity radius whose first Betti number vanishes.

A remark by William Thurston is that arithmetic manifolds "...often seem to have special beauty." This can be substantiated by results showing that the relation between topology and geometry for these manifolds is much more predictable than in general. For example:

- For a given genus g there are at most finitely many arithmetic (congruence) hyperbolic 3-manifolds which fiber over the circle with a fiber of genus g.
- There are at most finitely many arithmetic (congruence) hyperbolic 3-manifolds with a given Heegaard genus.
