= Tsachik Gelander =

Israeli mathematician

- צחיק גלנדר
- Citizenship: Israeli
- Education: PhD
- Alma mater: Hebrew University of Jerusalem
- Awards: Haim Nessyahu Prize in Mathematics; ERC Starting Grant (2007); ERC Advanced Grant (2021)
- Scientific career
- Fields: Geometric group theory, locally compact groups, Lie groups, symmetric spaces
- Workplaces: Northwestern University, Hebrew University of Jerusalem, Weizmann Institute of Science
- Thesis: Counting Manifolds and Tits Alternative (2003)
- Doctoral advisor: Shahar Mozes

Tsachik Gelander (Hebrew: צחיק גלנדר) is an Israeli mathematician working in the fields of Lie groups, topological groups, symmetric spaces, rigidity, lattices and discrete subgroups (of Lie groups as well as general locally compact groups). He was a professor of mathematics at the Hebrew University of Jerusalem from 2006 until 2013, and has been at the Weizmann Institute of Science from 2013, and at Northwestern University from 2022.

Gelander earned his PhD from the Hebrew University of Jerusalem in 2003, under the supervision of Shahar Mozes. His doctoral dissertation, Counting Manifolds and Tits Alternative, won the Haim Nessyahu Prize in Mathematics, awarded by the Israel Mathematical Union for the best annual doctoral dissertation in mathematics. After holding a Gibbs Assistant Professorship at Yale University, and faculty positions at the Hebrew University of Jerusalem and the Weizmann Institute of Science, Gelander joined Northwestern where he is currently a professor of mathematics. He contributed to the theory of lattices, Fuchsian groups and local rigidity, and the work on Chern's conjecture and the Derivation Problem. Among his well-known results is the solution to the Goldman conjecture, i.e. that the action of $Out(F_n)$ on the deformation variety of a compact Lie group is ergodic when $n$ is at least $3$.

He gave the distinguished Nachdiplom Lectures at ETH Zurich in 2011, and was an invited speaker at the 2018 International Congress of Mathematicians, giving a talk under the title of Asymptotic Invariants of Locally Symmetric Spaces. He was one of the recipients of the first call of the European Research Council (ERC) Starting Grant (2007), and in 2021 he won the ERC Advanced Grant.

== Selected publications ==
- Gelander, Tsachik (15 September 2004). "Homotopy type and volume of locally symmetric manifolds". Duke Mathematical Journal. 124 (3). Duke University Press. arXiv:math/0111165. doi:10.1215/s0012-7094-04-12432-7. ISSN 0012-7094. S2CID 14272953.
- Bader, Uri; Furman, Alex; Gelander, Tsachik; Monod, Nicolas (2007). "Property (T) and rigidity for actions on Banach spaces". Acta Mathematica. 198 (1). International Press of Boston: 57–105. arXiv:math/0506361. doi:10.1007/s11511-007-0013-0. ISSN 0001-5962. S2CID 5739931.
- Breuillard, Emmanuel; Gelander, Tsachik (1 September 2007). "A topological Tits alternative". Annals of Mathematics. 166 (2): 427–474. arXiv:math/0403043. doi:10.4007/annals.2007.166.427. ISSN 0003-486X. S2CID 14859975.
- Breuillard, E.; Gelander, T. (3 May 2008). "Uniform independence in linear groups". Inventiones Mathematicae. 173 (2). Springer Science and Business Media LLC: 225–263. arXiv:math/0611829. Bibcode:2008InMat.173..225B. doi:10.1007/s00222-007-0101-y. ISSN 0020-9910. S2CID 16029687.
- Gelander, Tsachik; Karlsson, Anders; Margulis, Gregory (2008). "Superrigidity, generalized harmonic maps and uniformly convex spaces". Geometric and Functional Analysis. 17 (5): 1524–1550. arXiv:math/0606256. Bibcode:2008InMat.173..225B. doi:10.1007/s00039-007-0639-2. S2CID 16029687.
- Belolipetsky, Mikhail; Gelander, Tsachik; Lubotzky, Alexander; Shalev, Aner (5 October 2010). "Counting arithmetic lattices and surfaces". Annals of Mathematics. 172 (3): 2197–2221. arXiv:0811.2482. doi:10.4007/annals.2010.172.2197. ISSN 0003-486X. S2CID 14172846.
- Bader, U.; Gelander, T.; Monod, N. (27 October 2011). "A fixed point theorem for L 1 spaces". Inventiones Mathematicae. 189 (1). Springer Science and Business Media LLC: 143–148. arXiv:1012.1488. doi:10.1007/s00222-011-0363-2. ISSN 0020-9910. S2CID 55594695.
- Abert, Miklos; Bergeron, Nicolas; Biringer, Ian; Gelander, Tsachik; Nikolav, Nikolay; Raimbault, Jean; Samet, Iddo (1 May 2017). "On the growth of $L^2$-invariants for sequences of lattices in Lie groups" (PDF). Annals of Mathematics. 185 (3). arXiv:1210.2961. doi:10.4007/annals.2017.185.3.1. ISSN 0003-486X. S2CID 106398777.
- Gelander, Tsachik; Levit, Arie (January 2018). "Local rigidity of uniform lattices". Commentarii Mathematici Helvetici. 93 (4): 781–827. arXiv:1605.01693. doi:10.4171/cmh/450.
- Gelander, Tsachik (2019). "A VIEW ON INVARIANT RANDOM SUBGROUPS AND LATTICES". Proceedings of the International Congress of Mathematicians (ICM 2018). WORLD SCIENTIFIC. pp. 1321–1344. arXiv:1807.06979. doi:10.1142/9789813272880_0099. ISBN 978-981-327-287-3.
- Fraczyk, Mikolaj; Gelander, Tsachik (January 2023). "Infinite volume and infinite injectivity radius". Annals of Mathematics. 197 (1): 389–421. arXiv:2101.00640. doi:10.4007/annals.2023.197.1.6.
