= Trace field of a representation =

In mathematics, the trace field of a linear group is the field generated by the traces of its elements. It is mostly studied for Kleinian and Fuchsian groups, though related objects are used in the theory of lattices in Lie groups, often under the name field of definition.

== Fuchsian and Kleinian groups ==
=== Trace field and invariant trace fields for Fuchsian groups ===
Fuchsian groups are discrete subgroups of $\mathrm{PSL}_2(\mathbb R)$. The trace of an element in $\mathrm{PSL}_2(\mathbb R)$ is well-defined up to sign (by taking the trace of an arbitrary preimage in $\mathrm{SL}_2(\mathbb R)$) and the trace field of $\Gamma$ is the field generated over $\mathbb Q$ by the traces of all elements of $\Gamma$ (see for example in Maclachlan & Reid (2003)).

The invariant trace field is equal to the trace field of the subgroup $\Gamma^{(2)}$ generated by all squares of elements of $\Gamma$ (a finite-index subgroup of $\Gamma$).

The invariant trace field of Fuchsian groups is stable under taking commensurable groups. This is not the case for the trace field; in particular the trace field is in general different from the invariant trace field.

=== Quaternion algebras for Fuchsian groups ===
Let $\Gamma$ be a Fuchsian group and $k$ its trace field. Let $A$ be the $k$-subalgebra of the matrix algebra $M_2(\mathbb R)$ generated by the preimages of elements of $\Gamma$. The algebra $A$ is then as simple as possible, more precisely:

If $\Gamma$ is of the first or second type then $A$ is a quaternion algebra over $k$.

The algebra $A$ is called the quaternion algebra of $\Gamma$. The quaternion algebra of $\Gamma^{(2)}$ is called the invariant quaternion algebra of $\Gamma$, denoted by $A\Gamma$. As for trace fields, the former is not the same for all groups in the same commensurability class but the latter is.

If $\Gamma$ is an arithmetic Fuchsian group then $k\Gamma$ and $A\Gamma$ together are a number field and quaternion algebra from which a group commensurable to $\Gamma$ may be derived.

=== Kleinian groups ===
The theory for Kleinian groups (discrete subgroups of $\mathrm{PSL}_2(\mathbb C)$) is mostly similar as that for Fuchsian groups. One big difference is that the trace field of a group of finite covolume is always a number field.

== Trace fields and fields of definition for subgroups of Lie groups ==
=== Definition ===
When considering subgroups of general Lie groups (which are not necessarily defined as a matrix groups) one has to use a linear representation of the group to take traces of elements. The most natural one is the adjoint representation. It turns out that for applications it is better, even for groups which have a natural lower-dimensional linear representation (such as the special linear groups $\mathrm{SL}_n(\mathbb R)$), to always define the trace field using the adjoint representation. Thus we have the following definition, originally due to Ernest Vinberg, who used the terminology "field of definition".

Let $G$ be a Lie group and $\Gamma \subset G$ a subgroup. Let $\rho$ be the adjoint representation of $G$. The trace field of $\Gamma$ is the field:

$$k\Gamma = \mathbb Q(\{ \operatorname{trace}(\rho(\gamma)) : \gamma \in \Gamma \}).$$

If two Zariski-dense subgroups of $G$ are commensurable then they have the same trace field in this sense.

=== The trace field for lattices ===
Let $G$ be a semisimple Lie group and $\Gamma \subset G$ a lattice. Suppose further that either $\Gamma$ is irreducible and $G$ is not locally isomorphic to $\mathrm{SL}_2(\mathbb R)$, or that $\Gamma$ has no factor locally isomorphic to $\mathrm{SL}_2(\mathbb R)$. Then local rigidity implies the following result.

The field $k\Gamma$ is a number field.

Furthermore, there exists an algebraic group $\mathbf G$ over $k\Gamma$ such that the group of real points $\mathbf G(\mathbb R)$ is isomorphic to $\rho(G)$ and $\rho(\Gamma)$ is contained in a conjugate of $\mathbf G(k\Gamma)$. Thus $k\Gamma$ is a "field of definition" for $\Gamma$ in the sense that it is a field of definition of its Zariski closure in the adjoint representation.

In the case where $\Gamma$ is arithmetic then it is commensurable to the arithmetic group defined by $\mathbf G$.

For Fuchsian groups the field $k\Gamma$ defined above is equal to its invariant trace field. For Kleinian groups they are the same if we use the adjoint representation over the complex numbers.
