= Zimmert set =

In mathematics, a Zimmert set is a set of positive integers associated with the structure of quotients of hyperbolic three-space by a Bianchi group.

== Definition ==
Fix an integer d and let D be the discriminant of the imaginary quadratic field Q(√-d). The Zimmert set Z(d) is the set of positive integers n such that 4n^{2} < -D-3 and n ≠ 2; D is a quadratic non-residue of all odd primes in d; n is odd if D is not congruent to 5 modulo 8. The cardinality of Z(d) may be denoted by z(d).

== Property ==
For all but a finite number of d we have z(d) > 1: indeed this is true for all d > 10^{476}.

== Application ==
Let Γ_{d} denote the Bianchi group PSL(2,O_{d}), where O_{d} is the ring of integers of. As a subgroup of PSL(2,C), there is an action of Γ_{d} on hyperbolic 3-space H_{3}, with a fundamental domain. It is a theorem that there are only finitely many values of d for which Γ_{d} can contain an arithmetic subgroup G for which the quotient H_{3}/G is a link complement. Zimmert sets are used to obtain results in this direction: z(d) is a lower bound for the rank of the largest free quotient of Γ_{d} and so the result above implies that almost all Bianchi groups have non-cyclic free quotients.
