= George Mostow =

American mathematician (1923–2017)

- Born: July 4, 1923
- Died: April 4, 2017 (aged 93)
- Education: Harvard University
- Known for: Mostow's rigidity theorem Mostow–Palais theorem
- Children: Jonathan Mostow
- Awards: Wolf Prize (2013); Leroy P. Steele Prize (1993)
- Scientific career
- Workplaces: Syracuse University; Johns Hopkins University; Yale University
- Thesis: The Extensibility of Local Lie Groups of Transformations and Groups on Surfaces (1948)
- Doctoral advisor: Garrett Birkhoff

George Daniel Mostow (July 4, 1923 – April 4, 2017) was an American mathematician, renowned for his contributions to Lie theory. He was the Henry Ford II (emeritus) Professor of Mathematics at Yale University, a member of the National Academy of Sciences, the 49th president of the American Mathematical Society (1987–1988), and a trustee of the Institute for Advanced Study from 1982 to 1992.

The rigidity phenomenon for lattices in Lie groups he discovered and explored is known as Mostow rigidity. His work on rigidity played an essential role in the work of three Fields medalists, namely Grigori Margulis, William Thurston, and Grigori Perelman.

== Biography ==
Mostow was born in Boston, Massachusetts. His parents were Jews from Ukraine who immigrated to the United States in the early 20th century. Mostow attended the Boston Latin School and Hebrew College before going to Harvard University, where he received his bachelor's degree in mathematics in 1943 and followed by his Ph.D. in mathematics in 1948. His Ph.D. thesis was written under the supervision of Garrett Birkhoff. His academic appointments had been at Syracuse University from 1949 to 1952, at Johns Hopkins University from 1952 to 1961, and at Yale University from 1961 until his retirement in 1999. He died on April 4, 2017.

== Honors ==
Mostow was elected to the National Academy of Sciences in 1974, served as the President of the American Mathematical Society in 1987 and 1988, and was a Trustee of the Institute for Advanced Study in Princeton, New Jersey from 1982 to 1992. He was awarded the AMS Leroy P. Steele Prize for Seminal Contribution to Research in 1993 for his book Strong rigidity of locally symmetric spaces (1973). In 1993 he was awarded the American Mathematical Society's Leroy P. Steele Prize for Seminal Contribution to Research. In 2013, he was awarded the Wolf Prize in Mathematics "for his fundamental and pioneering contribution to geometry and Lie group theory."

== See also ==
- Strong rigidity
- Superrigidity
- Hochschild–Mostow group
