= Margulis lemma =

In differential geometry, the Margulis lemma (named after Grigory Margulis) is a result about discrete subgroups of isometries of a non-positively curved Riemannian manifold (e.g. the hyperbolic n-space). Roughly, it states that within a fixed radius, usually called the Margulis constant, the structure of the orbits of such a group cannot be too complicated. More precisely, within this radius around a point all points in its orbit are in fact in the orbit of a nilpotent subgroup (in fact a bounded finite number of such).

== The Margulis lemma for manifolds of non-positive curvature ==
=== Formal statement ===
The Margulis lemma can be formulated as follows.

Let $X$ be a simply-connected manifold of non-positive bounded sectional curvature. There exist constants $C, \varepsilon>0$ with the following property. For any discrete subgroup $\Gamma$ of the group of isometries of $X$ and any $x \in X$, if $F_x$ is the set:

$$F_x = \{ g \in \Gamma: d(x, gx) < \varepsilon \}$$

then the subgroup generated by $F_x$ contains a nilpotent subgroup of index less than $C$. Here $d$ is the distance induced by the Riemannian metric.

An immediately equivalent statement can be given as follows: for any subset $F$ of the isometry group, if it satisfies that:

- there exists a $x \in X$ such that $\forall g \in F : d(x, gx) < \varepsilon$;
- the group $\langle F \rangle$ generated by $F$ is discrete

then $\langle F \rangle$ contains a nilpotent subgroup of index $\le C$.

=== Margulis constants ===
The optimal constant $\varepsilon$ in the statement can be made to depend only on the dimension and the lower bound on the curvature; usually it is normalised so that the curvature is between -1 and 0. It is usually called the Margulis constant of the dimension.

One can also consider Margulis constants for specific spaces. For example, there has been an important effort to determine the Margulis constant of the hyperbolic spaces (of constant curvature -1). For example:

- the optimal constant for the hyperbolic plane is equal to $2 \operatorname{arsinh} \left( \sqrt{\frac {2\cos(2\pi/7) - 1} {8\cos(\pi/7) + 7}} \right) \simeq 0.2629$;
- In general the Margulis constant $\varepsilon_n$ for the hyperbolic $n$-space is known to satisfy the bounds:
  $$c^{-n^2} < \varepsilon_n < K/\sqrt n$$
  for some $0 < c < 1, K > 0$.

=== Zassenhaus neighbourhoods ===
A particularly studied family of examples of negatively curved manifolds are given by the symmetric spaces associated to semisimple Lie groups. In this case the Margulis lemma can be given the following, more algebraic formulation which dates back to Hans Zassenhaus.

If $G$ is a semisimple Lie group there exists a neighbourhood $\Omega$ of the identity in $G$ and a $C > 0$ such that any discrete subgroup $\Gamma$ which is generated by $\Gamma \cap \Omega$ contains a nilpotent subgroup of index $\le C$.

Such a neighbourhood $\Omega$ is called a Zassenhaus neighbourhood in $G$. If $G$ is compact this theorem amounts to Jordan's theorem on finite linear groups.

== Thick-thin decomposition ==
Let $M$ be a Riemannian manifold and $\varepsilon > 0$. The thin part of $M$ is the subset of points $x \in M$ where the injectivity radius of $M$ at $x$ is less than $\varepsilon$, usually denoted $M_{< \varepsilon}$, and the thick part its complement, usually denoted $M_{\ge \varepsilon}$. There is a tautological decomposition into a disjoint union $M = M_{< \varepsilon} \cup M_{\ge \varepsilon}$.

When $M$ is of negative curvature and $\varepsilon$ is smaller than the Margulis constant for the universal cover $\widetilde M$, the structure of the components of the thin part is very simple. Let us restrict to the case of hyperbolic manifolds of finite volume. Suppose that $\varepsilon$ is smaller than the Margulis constant for $\mathbb H^n$ and let $M$ be a hyperbolic $n$-manifold of finite volume. Then its thin part has two sorts of components:

- Cusps: these are the unbounded components, they are diffeomorphic to a flat $(n-1)$-manifold times a line;
- Margulis tubes: these are neighbourhoods of closed geodesics of length $< \varepsilon$ on $M$. They are bounded and (if $M$ is orientable) diffeomorphic to a circle times a $(n-1)$-disc.

In particular, a complete finite-volume hyperbolic manifold is always diffeomorphic to the interior of a compact manifold (possibly with empty boundary).

== Other applications ==
The Margulis lemma is an important tool in the study of manifolds of negative curvature. Besides the thick-thin decomposition some other applications are:

- The collar lemma: this is a more precise version of the description of the compact components of the thin parts. It states that any closed geodesic of length $\ell < \varepsilon$ on an hyperbolic surface is contained in an embedded cylinder of diameter of order $\ell^{-1}$.
- The Margulis lemma gives an immediate qualitative solution to the problem of minimal covolume among hyperbolic manifolds: since the volume of a Margulis tube can be seen to be bounded below by a constant depending only on the dimension, it follows that there exists a positive infimum to the volumes of hyperbolic n-manifolds for any n.
- The existence of Zassenhaus neighbourhoods is a key ingredient in the proof of the Kazhdan–Margulis theorem.
- One can recover the Jordan–Schur theorem as a corollary to the existence of Zassenhaus neighbourhoods.

== See also ==
- Jorgensen's inequality gives a quantitative statement for discrete subgroups of the isometry group $\mathrm{PGL}_2(\mathbb C)$ of the 3-dimensional hyperbolic space.
