= Kazhdan–Margulis theorem =

Theorem in Lie theory in mathematics

In Lie theory, an area of mathematics, the Kazhdan–Margulis theorem is a statement asserting that a discrete subgroup in semisimple Lie groups cannot be too dense in the group. More precisely, in any such Lie group there is a uniform neighbourhood of the identity element such that every lattice in the group has a conjugate whose intersection with this neighbourhood contains only the identity. This result was proven in the 1960s by David Kazhdan and Grigory Margulis.

== Statement and remarks ==
The formal statement of the Kazhdan–Margulis theorem is as follows.

Let $G$ be a semisimple Lie group: there exists an open neighbourhood $U$ of the identity $e$ in $G$ such that for any discrete subgroup $\Gamma \subset G$ there is an element $g \in G$ satisfying $g\Gamma g^{-1} \cap U = \{ e \}$.

Note that in general Lie groups this statement is far from being true; in particular, in a nilpotent Lie group, for any neighbourhood of the identity there exists a lattice in the group which is generated by its intersection with the neighbourhood: for example, in $\mathbb R^n$, the lattice $\varepsilon \mathbb Z^n$ satisfies this property for $\varepsilon > 0$ small enough.

=== Proof ===
The main technical result of Kazhdan–Margulis, which is interesting in its own right and from which the better-known statement above follows immediately, is the following.

Given a semisimple Lie group without compact factors $G$ endowed with a norm $|\cdot|$, there exists $c > 1$, a neighbourhood $U_0$ of $e$ in $G$, a compact subset $E \subset G$ such that, for any discrete subgroup $\Gamma \subset G$ there exists a $g \in E$ such that $|g\gamma g^{-1}| \ge c|\gamma|$ for all $\gamma \in \Gamma \cap U_0$.

The neighbourhood $U_0$ is obtained as a Zassenhaus neighbourhood of the identity in $G$: the theorem then follows by standard Lie-theoretic arguments.

There also exist other proofs. There is one proof which is more geometric in nature and which can give more information, and there is a third proof, relying on the notion of invariant random subgroups, which is considerably shorter.

== Applications ==
=== Selberg's hypothesis ===
One of the motivations of Kazhdan–Margulis was to prove the following statement, known at the time as Selberg's hypothesis (recall that a lattice is called uniform if its quotient space is compact):

A lattice in a semisimple Lie group is non-uniform if and only if it contains a unipotent element.

This result follows from the more technical version of the Kazhdan–Margulis theorem and the fact that only unipotent elements can be conjugated arbitrarily close (for a given element) to the identity.

=== Volumes of locally symmetric spaces ===
A corollary of the theorem is that the locally symmetric spaces and orbifolds associated to lattices in a semisimple Lie group cannot have arbitrarily small volume (given a normalisation for the Haar measure).

For hyperbolic surfaces this is due to Siegel, and there is an explicit lower bound of $\pi / 21$ for the smallest covolume of a quotient of the hyperbolic plane by a lattice in $\mathrm{PSL}_2(\mathbb R)$ (see Hurwitz's automorphisms theorem). For hyperbolic three-manifolds the lattice of minimal volume is known and its covolume is about 0.0390. In higher dimensions the problem of finding the lattice of minimal volume is still open, though it has been solved when restricting to the subclass of arithmetic groups.

=== Wang's finiteness theorem ===
Together with local rigidity and finite generation of lattices the Kazhdan-Margulis theorem is an important ingredient in the proof of Wang's finiteness theorem.

If $G$ is a simple Lie group not locally isomorphic to $\mathrm{SL}_2(\mathbb R)$ or $\mathrm{SL}_2(\mathbb C)$ with a fixed Haar measure and $v>0$ there are only finitely many lattices in $G$ of covolume less than $v$.

== See also ==
- Margulis lemma
