= Meyerhoff manifold =

Mathemical concept

In hyperbolic geometry, the Meyerhoff manifold is the arithmetic hyperbolic 3-manifold obtained by $(5,1)$ surgery on the figure-8 knot complement. It was introduced by Robert Meyerhoff (1987) as a possible candidate for the hyperbolic 3-manifold of smallest volume, but the Weeks manifold turned out to have slightly smaller volume. It has the second smallest volume

$$V_m = 12\cdot(283)^{3/2}\zeta_k(2)(2\pi)^{-6} = 0.981368\dots$$

of orientable arithmetic hyperbolic 3-manifolds, where $\zeta_k$ is the zeta function of the quartic field of discriminant $-283$. Alternatively,

$$V_m = \Im(\rm{Li}_2(\theta)+\ln|\theta|\ln(1-\theta)) = 0.981368\dots$$

where $\rm{Li}_n$ is the polylogarithm and $|x|$ is the absolute value of the complex root $\theta$ (with positive imaginary part) of the quartic $\theta^4+\theta-1=0$.

Ted Chinburg (1987) showed that this manifold is arithmetic.

== See also ==
- Gieseking manifold
- Weeks manifold
