= Hyperbolic manifold =

Space where every point locally resembles a hyperbolic space

In mathematics, a hyperbolic manifold is a space where every point looks locally like hyperbolic space of some dimension. They are especially studied in dimensions 2 and 3, where they are called hyperbolic surfaces and hyperbolic 3-manifolds, respectively. In these dimensions, they are important because most manifolds can be made into a hyperbolic manifold by a homeomorphism. This is a consequence of the uniformization theorem for surfaces and the geometrization theorem for 3-manifolds proved by Perelman.

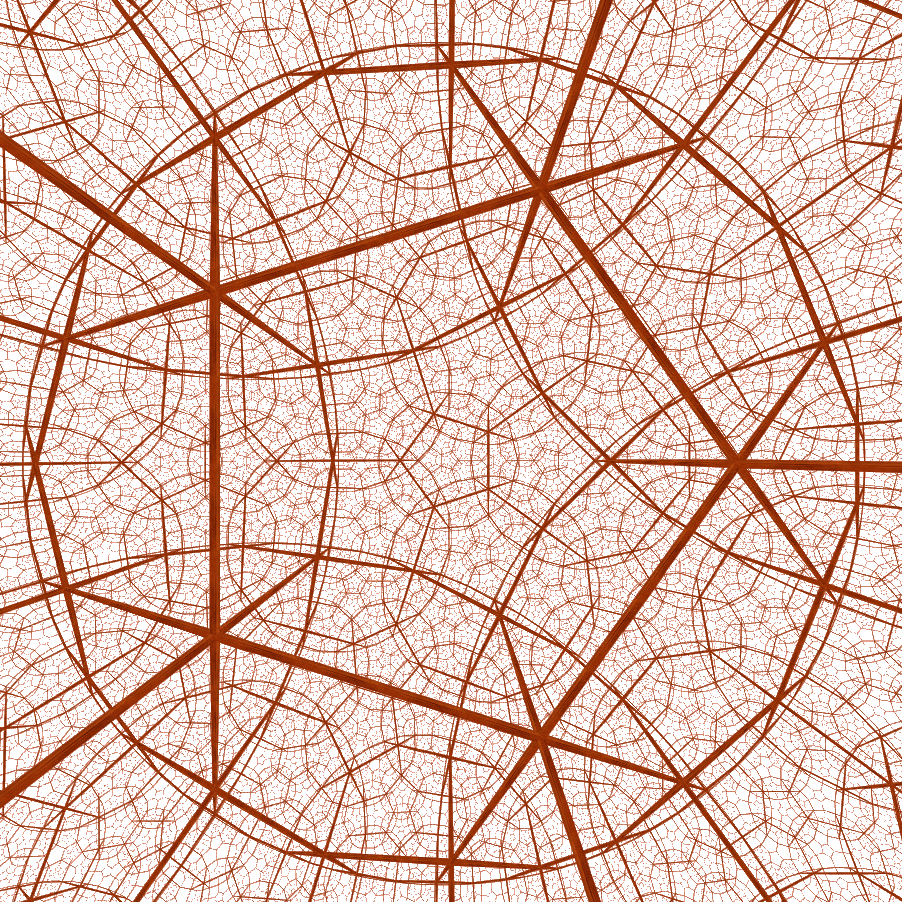
A perspective projection of a dodecahedral tessellation in H^{3}. This is an example of what an observer might see inside a hyperbolic 3-manifold.

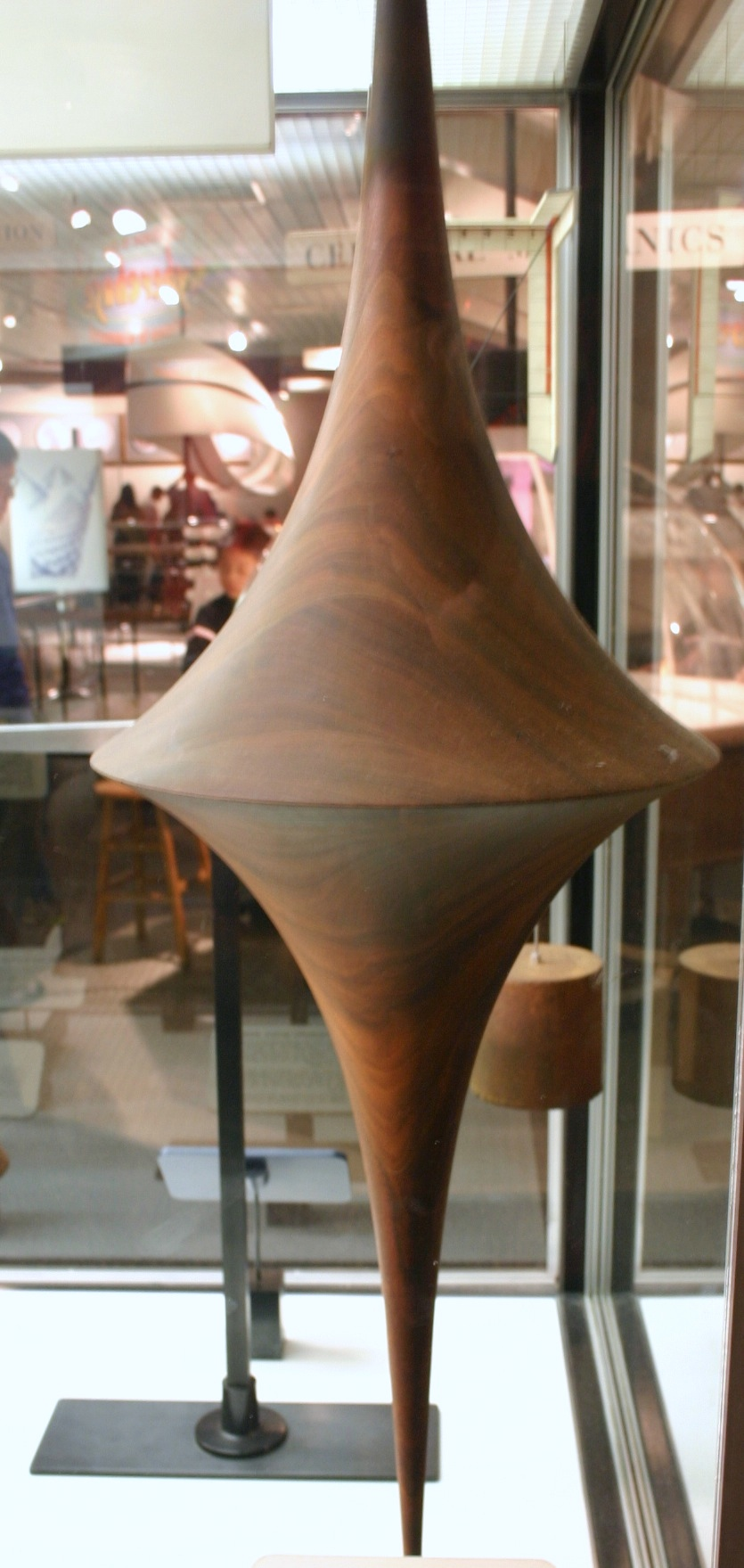
The Pseudosphere. Each half of this shape is a hyperbolic 2-manifold (i.e. surface) with boundary.

== Rigorous definition ==
A hyperbolic $n$-manifold is a complete Riemannian $n$-manifold of constant sectional curvature $-1$.

Every complete, connected, simply-connected manifold of constant negative curvature $-1$ is isometric to the real hyperbolic space $\mathbb{H}^n$. As a result, the universal cover of any closed manifold $M$ of constant negative curvature $-1$ is $\mathbb{H}^n$. Thus, every such $M$ can be written as $\mathbb{H}^n/\Gamma$ where $\Gamma$ is a torsion-free discrete group of isometries on $\mathbb{H}^n$. That is, $\Gamma$ is a discrete subgroup of $\mathrm{O}^+_{1,n}\mathbb{R}$. The manifold has finite volume if and only if $\Gamma$ is a lattice.

Its thick–thin decomposition has a thin part consisting of tubular neighborhoods of closed geodesics and ends which are the product of a Euclidean ($n-1$)-manifold and the closed half-ray. The manifold is of finite volume if and only if its thick part is compact.

== Examples ==
The simplest example of a hyperbolic manifold is hyperbolic space, as each point in hyperbolic space has a neighborhood isometric to hyperbolic space.

A simple non-trivial example, however, is the once-punctured torus. This is an example of an (Isom($\mathbb{H}^2$), $\mathbb{H}^2$)-manifold. This can be formed by taking an ideal rectangle in $\mathbb{H}^2$ – that is, a rectangle where the vertices are on the boundary at infinity, and thus don't exist in the resulting manifold – and identifying opposite images.

In a similar fashion, we can construct the thrice-punctured sphere, shown below, by gluing two ideal triangles together. This also shows how to draw curves on the surface – the black line in the diagram becomes the closed curve when the green edges are glued together. As we are working with a punctured sphere, the colored circles in the surface – including their boundaries – are not part of the surface, and hence are represented in the diagram as ideal vertices.

(Left) A gluing diagram for the thrice-punctured sphere. Edges that are colored the same are glued together. Notice that the points where the lines meet (including the point at infinity) lie on the boundary of hyperbolic space, and so are not part of the surface. (Right) The surface glued together.

Many knots and links, including some of the simpler knots such as the figure eight knot and the Borromean rings, are hyperbolic, and so the complement of the knot or link in $S^3$ is a hyperbolic 3-manifold of finite volume.

== Important results ==
For $n>2$ the hyperbolic structure on a finite volume hyperbolic $n$-manifold is unique by Mostow rigidity and so geometric invariants are in fact topological invariants. One of these geometric invariants used as a topological invariant is the hyperbolic volume of a knot or link complement, which can allow us to distinguish two knots from each other by studying the geometry of their respective manifolds.

== See also ==
- Hyperbolic 3-manifold
- Hyperbolic space
- Hyperbolization theorem
- Margulis lemma
- Normally hyperbolic invariant manifold
