= Troels Jørgensen =

Danish mathematician

Troels Jørgensen is a Danish mathematician at Columbia University working on hyperbolic geometry and complex analysis, who proved Jørgensen's inequality. He wrote his thesis in 1970 at the University of Copenhagen under the joint supervision of Werner Fenchel and Bent Fuglede.

== Work ==
He is known for Jørgensen's inequality, and for his discovery of a hyperbolic structure on certain fibered 3-manifolds which were one of the inspirations for William Thurston's Geometrisation Conjecture. He is also credited with being one of the co-discoverers of the ordered structure of the set of volumes of hyperbolic 3-manifolds.

== External resources ==
- Troels Jørgensen at the Mathematics Genealogy Project
