= Hochschild–Mostow group =

In mathematics, the Hochschild–Mostow group, introduced by Hochschild and Mostow (1957), is the universal pro-affine algebraic group generated by a group.
