= Jørgensen's inequality =

Inequality involving the traces of elements of a Kleinian group

In the mathematical theory of Kleinian groups, Jørgensen's inequality is an inequality involving the traces of elements of a Kleinian group, proved by Troels Jørgensen (1976).

The inequality states that if A and B generate a non-elementary discrete subgroup of the SL_{2}(C), then

$$\left|\operatorname{Tr}(A)^2 -4\right| + \left|\operatorname{Tr}\left(ABA^{-1}B^{-1}\right)-2\right|\ge 1. \,$$

The inequality gives a quantitative estimate of the discreteness of the group: many of the standard corollaries bound elements of the group away from the identity. For instance, if A is parabolic, then

$$\left\|A - I\right\|\ \left\|B - I\right\|\ge 1 \,$$

where $\|\cdot\|$ denotes the usual norm on SL_{2}(C).

Another consequence in the parabolic case is the existence of cusp neighborhoods in hyperbolic 3-manifolds: if G is a Kleinian group and j is a parabolic element of G with fixed point w, then there is a horoball based at w which projects to a cusp neighborhood in the quotient space $\mathbb{H}^3/G$. Jørgensen's inequality is used to prove that every element of G which does not have a fixed point at w moves the horoball entirely off itself and so does not affect the local geometry of the quotient at w; intuitively, the geometry is entirely determined by the parabolic element.

== See also ==
- The Margulis lemma is a qualitative generalisation to more general spaces of negative curvature.
