= Hee Oh =

South Korean American mathematician

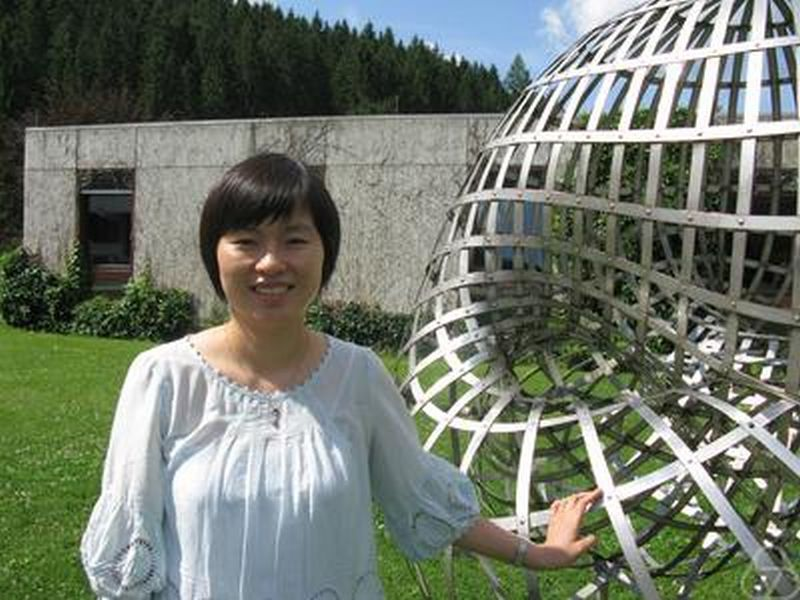
- Born: October 27, 1969 (age 56); Naju, South Korea
- Citizenship: United States
- Education: Yale University; Seoul National University; Gwangju Girls' High School
- Known for: dynamical systems
- Awards: Satter Prize (2015); Guggenheim Fellowship (2017); Ho-Am Prize (2018)
- Scientific career
- Workplaces: Yale University
- Thesis: Discrete subgroups generated by lattices in opposite horospherical subgroups (1997)
- Doctoral advisor: Gregory Margulis

Korean name
- Hangul: 오희
- Hanja: 吳熙
- RR: O Hui
- MR: O Hŭi
- Website: gauss.math.yale.edu/~ho2/

Hee Oh (Korean: 오희, born 27 October 1969) is a Korean American mathematician and the Abraham Robinson Professor of Mathematics at Yale University. She has made contributions to dynamical systems, discrete subgroups of Lie groups, and their connections to geometry and number theory.

== Career ==
She graduated with a bachelor's degree from Seoul National University in 1992 and obtained her Ph.D. from Yale University in 1997 under the guidance of Gregory Margulis. She held several faculty positions, including ones at Princeton University, California Institute of Technology and Brown University, before joining the Department of Mathematics at Yale University in 2013 as the first female tenured professor in Mathematics there. She served as Vice President of the American Mathematical Society, February 1, 2021 – January 31, 2024.

== Work ==
She has worked extensively on counting and equidistribution for Apollonian circle packings, Sierpinski carpets and Schottky dances. Her recent work continues to be centered around the exploration and use of Lie groups. More specifically, working with representations by using discrete sub groups, like Anosov Groups. Her research explores how these sub groups are useful in measuring characteristics of dynamical systems like maximal entropy.

== Honours ==
Hee Oh was an invited speaker at the International Congress of Mathematicians in Hyderabad in 2010, and gave a joint invited address at the 2012 AMS-MAA Joint Mathematics Meeting. In 2012 she became an inaugural fellow of the American Mathematical Society. She is the 2015 recipient of the Ruth Lyttle Satter Prize in Mathematics. In 2017, she was named a Guggenheim fellow. In 2018, she received the Ho-Am Prize for Science. In 2024, she was inducted into the American Academy of Arts and Sciences.

She served on the Fields Medal committee at the 2018 ICM in Rio. She is on the Abel Prize committee for 2024-2026.

== Selected publications ==
- with Laurent Clozel, Emmanuel Ullmo: Hecke operators and equidistribution of Hecke points, Inventiones mathematicae, vol. 144, 2001, pp. 327–351
- Uniform pointwise bounds for matrix coefficients of unitary representations and applications to Kazhdan constants, Duke Mathematical Journal, vol. 113, 2002, pp. 133–192
- with Alex Eskin, Shahar Mozes: On uniform exponential growth for linear groups, Inventiones mathematicae, vol. 160, 2005, pp. 1–30
- Proceedings of International Congress of Mathematicians (2010): Dynamics on geometrically finite hyperbolic manifolds with applications to Apollonian circle packings and beyond arXiv:1006.2590
- with Alex Kontorovich: Apollonian circle packings and closed horospheres on hyperbolic 3-manifolds, Journal of the American Mathematical Society, vol. 24, 2011, pp. 603–648
- with Nimish Shah: The asymptotic distribution of circles in the orbits of Kleinian groups, Inventiones mathematicae, vol. 187, 2012, pp. 1–35
- with Nimish Shah: Equidistribution and counting for orbits of geometrically finite hyperbolic groups, Journal of the American Mathematical Society, vol. 26, 2013, pp. 511–562
- with Amir Mohammadi: Ergodicity of unipotent flows and Kleinian groups, Journal of the American Mathematical Society, vol. 28, 2015, pp. 531–577
- with Dale Winter: Uniform exponential mixing and resonance free regions for convex cocompact congruence subgroups of SL_2(Z), Journal of the American Mathematical Society, vol. 29, 2016, pp. 1069–1115
- with Curtis McMullen, Amir Mohammadi: Geodesic planes in hyperbolic 3-manifolds, Inventiones mathematicae, vol. 209, 2017, pp. 425–461
- with Dale Winter: Prime number theorems and holonomies for hyperbolic rational maps, Inventiones mathematicae, vol. 208, 2017, pp. 401–440
