= Weeks manifold =

Smallest closed orientable hyperbolic 3-manifold

In mathematics, the Weeks manifold, sometimes called the Fomenko–Matveev–Weeks manifold, is a closed hyperbolic 3-manifold obtained by (5, 2) and (5, 1) Dehn surgeries on the Whitehead link. It has volume approximately equal to 0.942707… (OEIS: A126774) and David Gabai, Robert Meyerhoff, and Peter Milley (2009) showed that it has the smallest volume of any closed orientable hyperbolic 3-manifold. The manifold was independently discovered by Jeffrey Weeks (1985) as well as Sergei V. Matveev and Anatoly T. Fomenko (1988).

== Volume ==
Since the Weeks manifold is an arithmetic hyperbolic 3-manifold, its volume can be computed using its arithmetic data and a formula due to Armand Borel:

$$V_w = \frac{3 \cdot23^{3/2}\zeta_k(2)}{4\pi^4} = 0.942707\dots$$

where $k$ is the number field generated by $\theta$ satisfying $\theta^3-\theta+1=0$ and $\zeta_k$ is the Dedekind zeta function of $k$. Alternatively,

$$V_w = \Im(\rm{Li}_2(\theta)+\ln|\theta|\ln(1-\theta)) = 0.942707\dots$$

where $\rm{Li}_n$ is the polylogarithm and $|x|$ is the absolute value of the complex root $\theta$ (with positive imaginary part) of the cubic.

== Symmetries ==
The Weeks manifold has symmetry group $D_6$, the dihedral group of order 12. Quotients by this group and its subgroups can be used to characterize the manifold as a branched covering based on an orbifold. In particular, the quotient by the order-3 subgroup of the symmetry group has underlying set a 3-sphere and branch set a 5_{2} knot.

== Related manifolds ==
The cusped hyperbolic 3-manifold obtained by (5, 1) Dehn surgery on the Whitehead link is the so-called sibling manifold, or sister, of the figure-eight knot complement. The figure eight knot's complement and its sibling have the smallest volume of any orientable, cusped hyperbolic 3-manifold. Thus the Weeks manifold can be obtained by hyperbolic Dehn surgery on one of the two smallest orientable cusped hyperbolic 3-manifolds.

== See also ==
- Meyerhoff manifold – another manifold with very small volume
