= Andrzej Białynicki-Birula =

Polish mathematician (1935–2021)

Andrzej Białynicki-Birula (26 December 1935 – 19 April 2021) was a Polish mathematician, best known for his work on algebraic geometry. He was considered one of the pioneers of differential algebra. He was a member of the Polish Academy of Sciences. Białynicki-Birula was married to a paleontologist and phylogeneticist Magdalena Borsuk-Białynicka.

Białynicki-Birula was born in Nowogrodek, Polish Republic, currently known as Navahrudak, West Belarus. His elder brother, Iwo Białynicki-Birula, was born two years earlier and is a theoretical physicist and a fellow member of the Polish Academy of Sciences.

Białynicki-Birula received his Ph.D. from the University of California, Berkeley in 1960. His thesis was written under the direction of Gerhard Hochschild. Since 1970, he was Professor of Mathematics at the University of Warsaw, in 1977-1980 — Dean of the Faculty of Mathematics, Mechanics and Information; 1987-1990 — Vice Rector. In 1999, he received the Sierpiński Medal conferred jointly by the Polish Mathematical Society and the University of Warsaw.

== See also ==
- List of Polish mathematicians
