= Meyer's theorem =

Indefinite quadratic forms in > 4 variables over the rationals nontrivially represent 0

In number theory, Meyer's theorem on quadratic forms states that an indefinite quadratic form Q in five or more variables over the field of rational numbers nontrivially represents zero. In other words, if the equation Q(x) = 0 has a non-zero real solution, then it has a non-zero rational solution. By clearing the denominators, an integral solution x may also be found.

Meyer's theorem is usually deduced from the Hasse–Minkowski theorem (which was proved later) and the following statement:

A rational quadratic form in five or more variables represents zero over the field ℚ_{p} of p-adic numbers for all p.

Meyer's theorem is the best possible with respect to the number of variables: there are indefinite rational quadratic forms Q in four variables which do not represent zero. One family of examples is given by

Q(x_{1},x_{2},x_{3},x_{4}) = x^{2}_{1} + x^{2}_{2} − px^{2}_{3} − px^{2}_{4},

where p is a prime number that is congruent to 3 modulo 4. This can be proved by the method of infinite descent using the fact that, if the sum of two perfect squares is divisible by such a p, then each summand is divisible by p.

== See also ==
- Lattice (group)
- Oppenheim conjecture
