= Uniform tree =

Mathematical concept

Section of the uniform tree for graph $G$

In mathematics, a uniform tree is a locally finite tree which is the universal cover of a finite graph. Equivalently, the full automorphism group $G=Aut(X)$ of the tree, which is a locally compact topological group, is unimodular and $G/X$ is finite. Also equivalent is the existence of a uniform X-lattice in $G$.

For a graph $G$ which contains no cycles, $G$ is its own uniform tree. If $G$ contains at least 1 cycle, its uniform tree is an infinite tree.

Leighton's Graph Covering Theorem states that any two finite graphs that share a common covering must also share a common finite covering. Walter D. Neumann expanded on this in 2011, proving any two graphs that have a common covering necessarily have the same universal covering. This means that every uniform tree corresponds to a unique family of finite graphs.

== See also ==
- Covering graph

== Sources ==
- Bass, Hyman; Lubotzky, Alexander (2001), Tree Lattices, Progress in Mathematics, vol. 176, Birkhäuser, ISBN 0-8176-4120-3
- Neumann, Walter D. (2011). "On Leighton's graph covering theorem". Groups, Geometry, and Dynamics. 4 (4): 863–872. arXiv:0906.2496. doi:10.4171/ggd/111.
