= Gerhard Hochschild =

German-born American mathematician

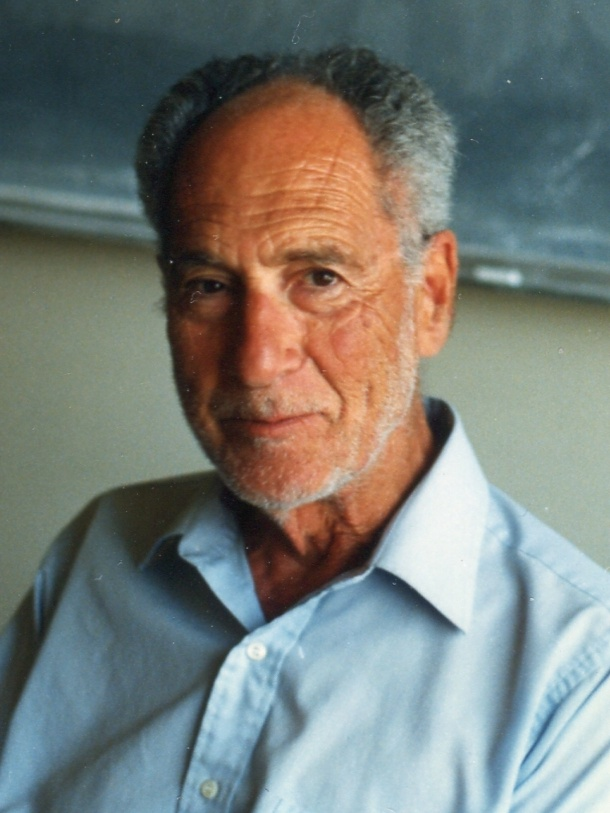
- Gerhard Hochschild in Berkeley, 1986
- Born: April 29, 1915; Berlin, Germany
- Died: July 8, 2010 (age 95); El Cerrito, California
- Citizenship: German; American
- Spouse: Ruth Heinsheimer
- Parent(s): Lilli and Heinrich Hochschild

Academic background
- Education: University of Cape Town; Princeton University
- Doctoral advisor: Claude Chevalley

Academic work
- Institutions: UIUC; University of California, Berkeley
- Doctoral students: Andrzej Białynicki-Birula; James Ax

Gerhard Paul Hochschild (April 29, 1915 in Berlin – July 8, 2010 in El Cerrito, California) was a German-born American mathematician who worked on Lie groups, algebraic groups, homological algebra and algebraic number theory.

== Early life ==
On April 29, 1915, Hochschild was born to a middle-class Jewish family in Berlin, Germany, the son of Lilli and Heinrich Hochschild. Hochschild had an older brother. His father was a patent attorney who had an engineering degree. After the rise of the National Socialist German Workers' Party in 1933, his father sent him to South Africa where he was able to enroll in school with funding from the Hochschild Family Foundation established by Berthold Hochschild, a cousin of his grandfather.

== Education ==
In 1936, Hochschild earned a BS degree in mathematics from University of Cape Town in Union of South Africa. In 1937, Hochschild earned a MS degree in mathematics from University of Cape Town. In 1941, Hochschild earned his PhD in mathematics from Princeton University. Hochschild completed his thesis in 1941 at Princeton University with Claude Chevalley on Semisimple Algebras and Generalized Derivations.

== Career ==
In 1956–7 Hochschild was at the Institute for Advanced Study. Hochschild was a professor at University of Illinois at Urbana-Champaign. In the late 1950s Hochschild was a professor at University of California, Berkeley.

Hochschild (1945) introduced Hochschild cohomology, a cohomology theory for algebras, which classifies deformations of algebras. Hochschild & Nakayama (1952) introduced cohomology into class field theory. Along with Bertram Kostant and Alex F. T. W. Rosenberg, the Hochschild–Kostant–Rosenberg theorem is named after him.

Among his students were Andrzej Białynicki-Birula and James Ax.

In 1955, Hochschild was a Guggenheim Fellow. In 1979 Hochschild was elected to the National Academy of Sciences, and in 1980 he was awarded the Leroy P. Steele Prize of the AMS.

In 1982, Hochschild retired but continued teaching part-time until 1985.

== Personal life ==
In July 1950, Hochschild married Ruth Heinsheimer. Ruth was born in Germany and fled with her mother in 1939; the couple met at the University of Illinois where she was earning her M.S. in mathematics and Gerhard was working as an assistant professor. Hochschild's children are Ann Hochschild (b. 1955) and Peter Hochschild (b. 1957).

On July 8, 2010, Hochschild died at his home. Hochschild was 95.

== See also ==
- Hochschild–Mostow group

== Publications ==
- Hochschild, G. (1945), "On the cohomology groups of an associative algebra", Annals of Mathematics, Second Series, 46 (1): 58–67, doi:10.2307/1969145, ISSN 0003-486X, JSTOR 1969145, MR 0011076, S2CID 124400094
- Hochschild, G.; Nakayama, Tadasi (1952), "Cohomology in class field theory", Annals of Mathematics, Second Series, 55 (2): 348–366, doi:10.2307/1969783, ISSN 0003-486X, JSTOR 1969783, MR 0047699
- Hochschild, G. (1965), The structure of Lie groups, San Francisco, Calif.: Holden–Day Inc., MR 0207883
- Hochschild, G. (1971), Introduction to affine algebraic groups, San Francisco, Calif.: Holden–Day Inc., MR 0277535
- Hochschild, Gerhard Paul (1981), Basic theory of algebraic groups and Lie algebras, Graduate Texts in Mathematics, vol. 75, Berlin, New York: Springer-Verlag, ISBN 978-0-387-90541-9, MR 0620024
- Hochschild, Gerhard Paul (1983), Perspectives of elementary mathematics, Berlin, New York: Springer-Verlag, ISBN 978-0-387-90848-9, MR 0710303
