= Class number =

In mathematics, class number may refer to

- Class number (group theory), in group theory, is the number of conjugacy classes of a group
- Class number (number theory), the size of the ideal class group of a number ring
- Class number (binary quadratic forms), the number of equivalence classes of binary quadratic forms of a given discriminant
