= David Kazhdan =

Soviet-Israeli mathematician

- דוד קשדן
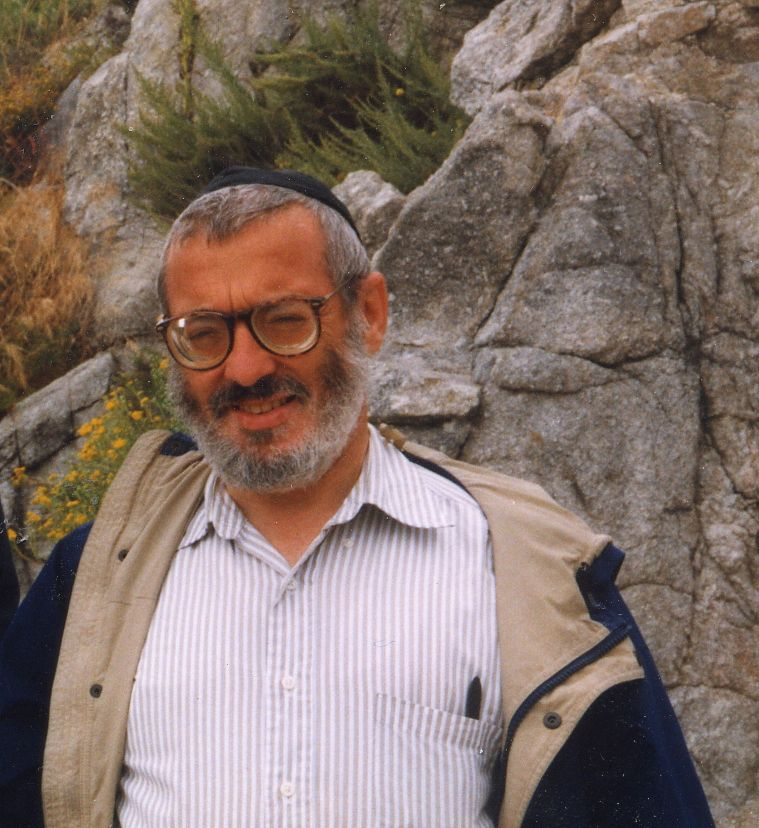
- Born: 20 June 1946 (age 80); Moscow, Russian SFSR, Soviet Union
- Education: Moscow State University
- Known for: Kazhdan–Lusztig polynomial Kazhdan–Margulis theorem Kazhdan's property (T)
- Awards: Israel Prize (2012); Wolf Prize in Mathematics (2026)
- Scientific career
- Fields: Mathematics
- Workplaces: Hebrew University of Jerusalem; Harvard University
- Doctoral advisor: Alexandre Kirillov
- Doctoral students: Misha Verbitsky; Vladimir Voevodsky

David Kazhdan (Hebrew: דוד קשדן), born Dmitry Aleksandrovich Kazhdan (Russian: Дмитрий Александрович Каждан; born 20 June 1946), is a Soviet and Israeli mathematician known for work in representation theory. Kazhdan is a 1990 MacArthur Fellow. In 2012, he received the Israel Prize for Mathematics and Computer sciences.

== Biography ==
Kazhdan was born on 20 June 1946 in Moscow, USSR. His father is Alexander Kazhdan. He earned a doctorate under Alexandre Kirillov in 1969 and was a member of Israel Gelfand's school of mathematics. He is Jewish, and emigrated from the Soviet Union to take a position at Harvard University in 1975. He changed his name from Dmitri Aleksandrovich to David and became an Orthodox Jew around that time.

In 2002, he immigrated to Israel and is now a professor at the Hebrew University of Jerusalem as well as a professor emeritus at Harvard.

On October 6, 2013, Kazhdan was critically injured in a car accident while riding a bicycle in Jerusalem.

Kazhdan has four children. His son, Eli Kazhdan, was general director of Natan Sharansky's Yisrael BaAliyah political party (now merged with Likud), chief of staff in the Ministry of Industry and Trade and the Ministry of Interior, and a foreign policy advisor to Sharansky.

== Research ==
He is known for collaboration with Israel Gelfand, Victor Kac, George Lusztig (on the Kazhdan–Lusztig conjecture on Verma modules), with Grigory Margulis (Kazhdan–Margulis theorem), with Yuval Flicker and S. J. Patterson on the representations of metaplectic groups. Kazhdan's property (T) is widely used in representation theory.

Kazhdan held a MacArthur Fellowship from 1990 to 1995. He was the doctoral advisor of Vladimir Voevodsky, a recipient of the Fields Medal, one of the highest awards in mathematics. Kazhdan has been a member of United States National Academy of Sciences since 1990, of the Israel Academy of Sciences since 2006, and of the American Academy of Arts and Sciences since 2008. In 2012, he was awarded the Israel Prize, the country's highest academic honor, for mathematics and computer science. In 2020 he received the Shaw Prize in Mathematics. In 2026 he was awarded the Wolf Prize in Mathematics

== Selected publications ==
- Quantum fields and strings: a course for mathematicians. Vol. 1, 2. Material from the Special Year on Quantum Field Theory held at the Institute for Advanced Study, Princeton, NJ, 1996–1997. Edited by Pierre Deligne, Pavel Etingof, Daniel S. Freed, Lisa C. Jeffrey, David Kazhdan, John W. Morgan, David R. Morrison and Edward Witten. American Mathematical Society, Providence, RI; Institute for Advanced Study (IAS), Princeton, NJ, 1999. Vol. 1: xxii+723 pp.; Vol. 2: pp. i--xxiv and 727–1501. ISBN 0-8218-1198-3, 81-06 (81T30 81Txx)
