= Mostow rigidity theorem =

Theorem in hyperbolic geometry

In mathematics, Mostow's rigidity theorem, or strong rigidity theorem, or Mostow–Prasad rigidity theorem, essentially states that the geometry of a complete, finite-volume hyperbolic manifold of dimension greater than two is determined by the fundamental group and hence unique. The theorem was proven for closed manifolds by Mostow (1968) and extended to finite volume manifolds by Marden (1974) in 3 dimensions, and by Prasad (1973) in all dimensions at least 3. Gromov (1981) gave an alternate proof using the Gromov norm. Besson, Courtois & Gallot (1996) gave the simplest available proof.

While the theorem shows that the deformation space of (complete) hyperbolic structures on a finite volume hyperbolic $n$-manifold (for $n >2$) is a point, for a hyperbolic surface of genus $g>1$ there is a moduli space of dimension $6g-6$ that parameterizes all metrics of constant curvature (up to diffeomorphism), a fact essential for Teichmüller theory. There is also a rich theory of deformation spaces of hyperbolic structures on infinite volume manifolds in three dimensions.

== The theorem ==
The theorem can be given in a geometric formulation (pertaining to finite-volume, complete manifolds), and in an algebraic formulation (pertaining to lattices in Lie groups).

=== Geometric form ===
Let $\mathbb H^n$ be the $n$-dimensional hyperbolic space. A complete hyperbolic manifold can be defined as a quotient of $\mathbb H^n$ by a group of isometries acting freely and properly discontinuously (it is equivalent to define it as a Riemannian manifold with sectional curvature -1 which is complete). It is of finite volume if the integral of a volume form is finite (which is the case, for example, if it is compact). The Mostow rigidity theorem may be stated as:

Suppose $M$ and $N$ are complete finite-volume hyperbolic manifolds of dimension $n \ge 3$. If there exists an isomorphism $f\colon \pi_1(M) \to \pi_1(N)$ then it is induced by a unique isometry from $M$ to $N$.

Here $\pi_1(X)$ is the fundamental group of a manifold $X$. If $X$ is a hyperbolic manifold obtained as the quotient of $\mathbb H^n$ by a group $\Gamma$ then $\pi_1(X) \cong \Gamma$.

An equivalent statement is that any homotopy equivalence from $M$ to $N$ can be homotoped to a unique isometry. The proof actually shows that if $N$ has greater dimension than $M$ then there can be no homotopy equivalence between them.

=== Algebraic form ===
The group of isometries of hyperbolic space $\mathbb H^n$ can be identified with the Lie group $\mathrm{PO}(n,1)$ (the projective orthogonal group of a quadratic form of signature $(n,1)$. Then the following statement is equivalent to the one above.

Let $n \ge 3$ and $\Gamma$ and $\Lambda$ be two lattices in $\mathrm{PO}(n,1)$ and suppose that there is a group isomorphism $f\colon \Gamma \to \Lambda$. Then $\Gamma$ and $\Lambda$ are conjugate in $\mathrm{PO}(n,1)$. That is, there exists a $g \in \mathrm{PO}(n,1)$ such that $\Lambda = g \Gamma g^{-1}$.

=== In greater generality ===
Mostow rigidity holds (in its geometric formulation) more generally for fundamental groups of all complete, finite volume, non-positively curved (without Euclidean factors) locally symmetric spaces of dimension at least three, or in its algebraic formulation for all lattices in simple Lie groups not locally isomorphic to $\mathrm{SL}_2(\R)$.

== Applications ==
It follows from the Mostow rigidity theorem that the group of isometries of a finite-volume hyperbolic $n$-manifold $M$ (for $n > 2$) is finite and isomorphic to $\operatorname{Out}(\pi_1(M))$.

Mostow rigidity was also used by Thurston to prove the uniqueness of circle packing representations of triangulated planar graphs.

A consequence of Mostow rigidity of interest in geometric group theory is that there exist hyperbolic groups which are quasi-isometric but not commensurable to each other.

== See also ==
- Superrigidity, a stronger result for higher-rank spaces
- Local rigidity, a result about deformations that are not necessarily lattices.
