= Oppenheim conjecture =

1929 mathematical conjecture

In Diophantine approximation, a subfield of number theory, the Oppenheim conjecture concerns representations of numbers by real quadratic forms in several variables. It was formulated in 1929 by Alexander Oppenheim and later the conjectured property was further strengthened by Harold Davenport and Oppenheim. Initial research on this problem took the number n of variables to be large, and applied a version of the Hardy-Littlewood circle method. The definitive work of Grigory Margulis, settling the conjecture in the affirmative, used methods arising from ergodic theory and the study of discrete subgroups of semisimple Lie groups.

== Overview ==
Meyer's theorem states that an indefinite integral quadratic form Q in n variables, n ≥ 5, nontrivially represents zero, i.e. there exists a non-zero vector x with integer components such that Q(x) = 0. The Oppenheim conjecture can be viewed as an analogue of this statement for forms Q that are not multiples of a rational form. It states that in this case, the set of values of Q on integer vectors is a dense subset of the real line.

== History ==
Several versions of the conjecture were formulated by Oppenheim and Harold Davenport.

- Let Q be a real nondegenerate indefinite quadratic form in n variables. Suppose that n ≥ 3 and Q is not a multiple of a form with rational coefficients. Then for any ε > 0 there exists a non-zero vector x with integer components such that |Q(x)| < ε.

For n ≥ 5 this was conjectured by Oppenheim in 1929; the stronger version is due to Davenport in 1946.

- Let Q and n have the same meaning as before. Then for any ε > 0 there exists a non-zero vector x with integer components such that 0 < |Q(x, x)| < ε.

This was conjectured by Oppenheim in 1953 and proved by Birch, Davenport, and Ridout for n at least 21, and by Davenport and Heilbronn for diagonal forms in five variables. Other partial results are due to Oppenheim (for forms in four variables, but under the strong restriction that the form represents zero over Z), Watson, Iwaniec, Baker–Schlickewey. Early work involved analytic number theory and reduction theory of quadratic forms.

The conjecture was proved in 1987 by Margulis in complete generality using methods of ergodic theory. Geometry of actions of certain unipotent subgroups of the orthogonal group on the homogeneous space of the lattices in R^{3} plays a decisive role in this approach. It is sufficient to establish the case n = 3. The idea to derive the Oppenheim conjecture from a statement about homogeneous group actions is usually attributed to M. S. Raghunathan, who observed in the 1970s that the conjecture for n = 3 is equivalent to the following property of the space of lattices:

- Any relatively compact orbit of SO(2, 1) in SL(3, R)/SL(3, Z) is compact.

However, Margulis later remarked that in an implicit form this equivalence occurred already in a 1955 paper of Cassels and H. P. F. Swinnerton-Dyer, albeit in a different language.

Shortly after Margulis's breakthrough, the proof was simplified and generalized by Dani and Margulis. Qualitative versions of the Oppenheim conjecture were later proved by Eskin–Margulis–Mozes. Borel and Prasad established some S-arithmetic analogues. The study of the properties of unipotent and quasiunipotent flows on homogeneous spaces remains an active area of research, with applications to further questions in the theory of Diophantine approximation.

== See also ==
- Ratner's theorems
