= Arithmetic group =

Type of group in group theory

In mathematics, an arithmetic group is a group obtained as the integer points of an algebraic group, for example $\mathrm{SL}_2(\Z).$ They arise naturally in the study of arithmetic properties of quadratic forms and other classical topics in number theory. They also give rise to very interesting examples of Riemannian manifolds and hence are objects of interest in differential geometry and topology. Finally, these two topics join in the theory of automorphic forms which is fundamental in modern number theory.

== History ==
One of the origins of the mathematical theory of arithmetic groups is algebraic number theory. The classical reduction theory of quadratic and Hermitian forms by Charles Hermite, Hermann Minkowski and others can be seen as computing fundamental domains for the action of certain arithmetic groups on the relevant symmetric spaces. The topic was related to Minkowski's geometry of numbers and the early development of the study of arithmetic invariants of number fields such as the discriminant. Arithmetic groups can be thought of as a vast generalisation of the unit groups of number fields to a noncommutative setting.

The same groups also appeared in analytic number theory as the study of classical modular forms and their generalisations developed. Of course the two topics were related, as can be seen for example in Langlands' computation of the volume of certain fundamental domains using analytic methods. This classical theory culminated with the work of Siegel, who showed the finiteness of the volume of a fundamental domain in many cases.

For the modern theory to begin foundational work was needed, and was provided by the work of Armand Borel, André Weil, Jacques Tits and others on algebraic groups. Shortly afterwards the finiteness of covolume was proven in full generality by Borel and Harish-Chandra. Meanwhile, there was progress on the general theory of lattices in Lie groups by Atle Selberg, Grigori Margulis, David Kazhdan, M. S. Raghunathan and others. The state of the art after this period was essentially fixed in Raghunathan's treatise, published in 1972.

In the seventies Margulis revolutionised the topic by proving that in "most" cases the arithmetic constructions account for all lattices in a given Lie group. Some limited results in this direction had been obtained earlier by Selberg, but Margulis's methods (the use of ergodic-theoretical tools for actions on homogeneous spaces) were completely new in this context and were to be extremely influential on later developments, effectively renewing the old subject of geometry of numbers and allowing Margulis himself to prove the Oppenheim conjecture; stronger results (Ratner's theorems) were later obtained by Marina Ratner.

In another direction the classical topic of modular forms has blossomed into the modern theory of automorphic forms. The driving force behind this effort is mainly the Langlands program initiated by Robert Langlands. One of the main tools used there is the trace formula originating in Selberg's work and developed in the most general setting by James Arthur.

Finally arithmetic groups are often used to construct interesting examples of locally symmetric Riemannian manifolds. A particularly active research topic has been arithmetic hyperbolic 3-manifolds, which as William Thurston wrote, "...often seem to have special beauty."

== Definition and construction ==
=== Arithmetic groups ===
If $\mathrm G$ is an algebraic subgroup of $\mathrm{GL}_n(\Q)$ for some $n$ then we can define an arithmetic subgroup of $\mathrm G(\Q)$ as the group of integer points $\Gamma = \mathrm{GL}_n(\Z) \cap \mathrm G(\Q).$ In general it is not so obvious how to make precise sense of the notion of "integer points" of a $\Q$-group, and the subgroup defined above can change when we take different embeddings $\mathrm G \to \mathrm{GL}_n(\Q).$

Thus a better notion is to take for definition of an arithmetic subgroup of $\mathrm G(\Q)$ any group $\Lambda$ which is commensurable (this means that both $\Gamma/(\Gamma\cap \Lambda)$ and $\Lambda/(\Gamma \cap \Lambda)$ are finite sets) with a group $\Gamma$ defined as above (with respect to any embedding into $\mathrm{GL}_n$). With this definition, to the algebraic group $\mathrm G$ is associated a collection of "discrete" subgroups all commensurable to each other.

=== Using number fields ===
A natural generalisation of the construction above is as follows: let $F$ be a number field with ring of integers $O$ and $\mathrm G$ an algebraic group over $F$. If we are given an embedding $\rho : \mathrm{G} \to \mathrm{GL}_n$ defined over $F$ then the subgroup $\rho^{-1}(\mathrm{GL}_n(O)) \subset \mathrm G(F)$ can legitimately be called an arithmetic group.

On the other hand, the class of groups thus obtained is not larger than the class of arithmetic groups as defined above. Indeed, if we consider the algebraic group $\mathrm G'$ over $\Q$ obtained by restricting scalars from $F$ to $\Q$ and the $\Q$-embedding $\rho' : \mathrm G' \to \mathrm{GL}_{dn}$ induced by $\rho$ (where $d = [F:\Q ]$) then the group constructed above is equal to $(\rho')^{-1}(\mathrm{GL}_{nd}(\Z))$.

== Examples ==
The classical example of an arithmetic group is $\mathrm{SL}_n(\Z)$, or the closely related groups $\mathrm{PSL}_n(\Z)$, $\mathrm{GL}_n(\Z)$ and $\mathrm{PGL}_n(\Z)$. For $n = 2$ the group $\mathrm{PSL}_2(\Z)$, or sometimes $\mathrm{SL}_2(\Z)$, is called the modular group as it is related to the modular curve. Similar examples are the Siegel modular groups $\mathrm{Sp}_{2g}(\Z)$.

Other well-known and studied examples include the Bianchi groups $\mathrm{SL}_2(O_{-m}),$ where $m > 0$ is a square-free integer and $O_{-m}$ is the ring of integers in the field $\Q(\sqrt{-m}),$ and the Hilbert–Blumenthal modular groups $\mathrm{SL}_2(O_m)$.

Another classical example is given by the integral elements in the orthogonal group of a quadratic form defined over a number field, for example $\mathrm{SO}(n,1)(\Z )$. A related construction is by taking the unit groups of orders in quaternion algebras over number fields (for example the Hurwitz quaternion order). Similar constructions can be performed with unitary groups of hermitian forms, a well-known example is the Picard modular group.

== Arithmetic lattices in semisimple Lie groups ==
When $G$ is a Lie group one can define an arithmetic lattice in $G$ as follows: for any algebraic group $\mathrm G$ defined over $\Q$ such that there is a morphism $\mathrm G(\R) \to G$ with compact kernel, the image of an arithmetic subgroup in $\mathrm G(\Q)$ is an arithmetic lattice in $G$. Thus, for example, if $G = \mathrm G(\R)$ and $G$ is a subgroup of $\mathrm{GL}_n$ then $G \cap \mathrm{GL}_n(\Z)$ is an arithmetic lattice in $G$ (but there are many more, corresponding to other embeddings); for instance, $\mathrm{SL}_n(\Z)$ is an arithmetic lattice in $\mathrm{SL}_n(\R )$.

=== The Borel–Harish-Chandra theorem ===
A lattice in a Lie group is usually defined as a discrete subgroup with finite covolume. The terminology introduced above is coherent with this, as a theorem due to Borel and Harish-Chandra states that an arithmetic subgroup in a semisimple Lie group is of finite covolume (the discreteness is obvious).

The theorem is more precise: it says that the arithmetic lattice is cocompact if and only if the "form" of $G$ used to define it (i.e. the $\Q$-group $\mathrm G$) is anisotropic. For example, the arithmetic lattice associated to a quadratic form in $n$ variables over $\Q$ will be co-compact in the associated orthogonal group if and only if the quadratic form does not vanish at any point in $\Q^n \setminus \{ 0\}$.

=== Margulis arithmeticity theorem ===
The spectacular result that Margulis obtained is a partial converse to the Borel–Harish-Chandra theorem: for certain Lie groups any lattice is arithmetic. This result is true for all irreducible lattices in semisimple Lie groups of real rank larger than two. For example, all lattices in $\mathrm{SL}_n(\R )$ are arithmetic when $n \ge 3$. The main new ingredient that Margulis used to prove his theorem was the superrigidity of lattices in higher-rank groups that he proved for this purpose.

Irreducibility only plays a role when $G$ has a factor of real rank one (otherwise the theorem always holds) and is not simple: it means that for any product decomposition $G = G_1\times G_2$ the lattice is not commensurable to a product of lattices in each of the factors $G_i$. For example, the lattice $\mathrm{SL}_2(\Z [\sqrt 2])$ in $\mathrm{SL}_2(\R) \times \mathrm{SL}_2(\R)$ is irreducible, while $\mathrm{SL}_2(\Z) \times \mathrm{SL}_2(\Z)$ is not.

The Margulis arithmeticity (and superrigidity) theorem holds for certain rank 1 Lie groups, namely $\mathrm{Sp}(n,1)$ for $n \geqslant 1$ and the exceptional group $F_4^{-20}$. It is known not to hold in all groups $\mathrm{SO}(n,1)$ for $n \geqslant 2$ (ref to GPS) and for $\mathrm{SU}(n, 1)$ when $n = 1,2,3$. There are no known non-arithmetic lattices in the groups $\mathrm{SU}(n,1)$ when $n \geqslant 4$.

=== Arithmetic Fuchsian and Kleinian groups ===
An arithmetic Fuchsian group is constructed from the following data: a totally real number field $F$, a quaternion algebra $A$ over $F$ and an order $\mathcal O$ in $A$. It is asked that for one embedding $\sigma: F \to \R$ the algebra $A^\sigma \otimes_F \R$ be isomorphic to the matrix algebra $M_2(\R)$ and for all others to the Hamilton quaternions. Then the group of units $\mathcal O^1$ is a lattice in $(A^\sigma \otimes_F \R)^1$ which is isomorphic to $\mathrm{SL}_2(\R),$ and it is co-compact in all cases except when $A$ is the matrix algebra over $\Q.$ All arithmetic lattices in $\mathrm{SL}_2(\R)$ are obtained in this way (up to commensurability).

Arithmetic Kleinian groups are constructed similarly except that $F$ is required to have exactly one complex place and $A$ to be the Hamilton quaternions at all real places. They exhaust all arithmetic commensurability classes in $\mathrm{SL}_2(\Complex).$

=== Classification ===
For every semisimple Lie group $G$ it is in theory possible to classify (up to commensurability) all arithmetic lattices in $G$, in a manner similar to the cases $G = \mathrm{SL}_2(\R), \mathrm{SL}_2(\Complex)$ explained above. This amounts to classifying the algebraic groups whose real points are isomorphic up to a compact factor to $G$.

=== The congruence subgroup problem ===
A congruence subgroup is (roughly) a subgroup of an arithmetic group defined by taking all matrices satisfying certain equations modulo an integer, for example the group of 2 by 2 integer matrices with diagonal (respectively off-diagonal) coefficients congruent to 1 (respectively 0) modulo a positive integer. These are always finite-index subgroups and the congruence subgroup problem roughly asks whether all subgroups are obtained in this way. The conjecture (usually attributed to Jean-Pierre Serre) is that this is true for (irreducible) arithmetic lattices in higher-rank groups and false in rank-one groups. It is still open in this generality but there are many results establishing it for specific lattices (in both its positive and negative cases).

== S-arithmetic groups ==
Instead of taking integral points in the definition of an arithmetic lattice one can take points which are only integral away from a finite number of primes. This leads to the notion of an $S$-arithmetic lattice (where $S$ stands for the set of primes inverted). The prototypical example is $\mathrm{SL}_2 \left( \Z \left[\tfrac 1 p \right] \right)$. They are also naturally lattices in certain topological groups, for example $\mathrm{SL}_2 \left( \Z \left[\tfrac 1 p \right] \right)$ is a lattice in $\mathrm{SL}_2(\R) \times \mathrm{SL}_2(\Q_p).$

=== Definition ===
The formal definition of an $S$-arithmetic group for $S$ a finite set of prime numbers is the same as for arithmetic groups with $\mathrm{GL}_n(\Z)$ replaced by $\mathrm{GL}_n\left(\Z \left[ \tfrac 1 N \right] \right)$ where $N$ is the product of the primes in $S$.

=== Lattices in Lie groups over local fields ===
The Borel–Harish-Chandra theorem generalizes to $S$-arithmetic groups as follows: if $\Gamma$ is an $S$-arithmetic group in a $\Q$-algebraic group $\mathrm G$ then $\Gamma$ is a lattice in the locally compact group
$$G = \mathrm G(\R) \times \prod_{p\in S} \mathrm G(\Q_p).$$

== Some applications ==
=== Explicit expander graphs ===
Arithmetic groups with Kazhdan's property (T) or the weaker property ($\tau$) of Lubotzky and Zimmer can be used to construct expander graphs (Margulis), or even Ramanujan graphs (Lubotzky-Phillips-Sarnak). Such graphs are known to exist in abundance by probabilistic results but the explicit nature of these constructions makes them interesting.

=== Extremal surfaces and graphs ===
Congruence covers of arithmetic surfaces are known to give rise to surfaces with large injectivity radius. Likewise the Ramanujan graphs constructed by Lubotzky-Phillips-Sarnak have large girth. It is in fact known that the Ramanujan property itself implies that the local girths of the graph are almost always large.

=== Isospectral manifolds ===
Arithmetic groups can be used to construct isospectral manifolds. This was first realised by Marie-France Vignéras and numerous variations on her construction have appeared since. The isospectrality problem is in fact particularly amenable to study in the restricted setting of arithmetic manifolds.

=== Fake projective planes ===
A fake projective plane is a complex surface which has the same Betti numbers as the projective plane $\mathbb P^2(\Complex)$ but is not biholomorphic to it; the first example was discovered by Mumford. By work of Klingler (also proved independently by Yeung) all such are quotients of the 2-ball by arithmetic lattices in $\mathrm{PU}(2,1)$. The possible lattices have been classified by Prasad and Yeung and the classification was completed by Cartwright and Steger who determined, by computer assisted computations, all the fake projective planes in each Prasad-Yeung class.
