= Shahar Mozes =

Israeli mathematician

- שחר מוזס
- Citizenship: Israeli
- Education: Hebrew University of Jerusalem
- Known for: Lie groups, Geometric group theory, Ergodic theory, Aperiodic tilings
- Awards: Erdős Prize (2000)
- Scientific career
- Fields: Mathematics
- Workplaces: Hebrew University of Jerusalem
- Doctoral advisor: Hillel Fürstenberg

Shahar Mozes (Hebrew: שחר מוזס) is an Israeli mathematician.

In 1991, Mozes received his doctorate from the Hebrew University of Jerusalem with thesis Actions of Cartan subgroups under the supervision of Hillel Fürstenberg. At the Hebrew University of Jerusalem, Mozes became in 1993 a senior lecturer, in 1996 associate professor, and in 2002 a full professor.

Moses does research on Lie groups and discrete subgroups of Lie groups, geometric group theory, ergodic theory, and aperiodic tilings. His collaborators include Jean Bourgain, Alex Eskin, Elon Lindenstrauss, Gregory Margulis, and Hee Oh.

In 2000, Mozes received the Erdős Prize. In 1998 he was an invited speaker with talk Products of trees, lattices and simple groups at the International Congress of Mathematicians (ICM) in Berlin. He was a plenary speaker at the ICM Satellite Conference on "Geometry Topology and Dynamics in Negative Curvature" held at the Raman Research Institute of the International Centre for Theoretical Sciences (ICTS) from August 2 to August 7, 2010.

== Selected publications ==
- Mozes, Shahar (1989). "Tilings, substitution systems and dynamical systems generated by them". Journal d'Analyse Mathématique. 53 (1): 139–186. doi:10.1007/BF02793412. ISSN 0021-7670.
- Mozes, Shahar (1990). "Reflection processes on graphs and Weyl groups". Journal of Combinatorial Theory, Series A. 53 (1): 128–142. doi:10.1016/0097-3165(90)90024-Q. ISSN 0097-3165.
- Mozes, Shahar (1992). "Mixing of all orders of Lie groups actions". Inventiones Mathematicae. 107 (1): 235–241. Bibcode:1992InMat.107..235M. doi:10.1007/BF01231889. ISSN 0020-9910.
- Lubotzky, Alexander; Mozes, S.; Raghunathan, M. S. (1993). "Cyclic subgroups of exponential growth and metrics on discrete groups" (PDF). C. R. Acad. Sci. Paris. Séries I. 317: 735. Archived from the original (PDF) on 2022-12-23.
- Mozes, Shahar (1995). "Epimorphic subgroups and invariant measures". Ergodic Theory and Dynamical Systems. 15 (6): 1207–1210. doi:10.1017/S0143385700009871. ISSN 0143-3857.
- Burger, M.; Mozes, S. (1996). "CAT(-1)-Spaces, Divergence Groups and their Commensurators". Journal of the American Mathematical Society. 9 (1): 57–93. doi:10.1090/S0894-0347-96-00196-8. JSTOR 2152840.
- Eskin, Alex; Mozes, Shahar; Shah, Nimish (1996). "Unipotent Flows and Counting Lattice Points on Homogeneous Varieties". The Annals of Mathematics. 143 (2): 253. doi:10.2307/2118644. JSTOR 2118644. S2CID 18628583.
- Eskin, A.; Mozes, S.; Shah, N. (1997). "Non-divergence of translates of certain algebraic measures". Geometric and Functional Analysis. 7: 48–80. doi:10.1007/PL00001616.
- Burger, Marc; Mozes, Shahar (1997). "Finitely presented products of trees" (PDF). C. R. Acad. Sci. Paris. Séries I. 324: 747–752. doi:10.1016/S0764-4442(97)86938-8.
- Mozes, S. (1997). "Aperiodic tilings". Inventiones Mathematicae. 128 (3): 603–611. Bibcode:1997InMat.128..603M. doi:10.1007/s002220050153.
- Eskin, A.; Margulis, G.; Mozes, S. (1998). "Upper bounds and asymptotics in a quantitative version of the Oppenheim conjecture". Annals of Mathematics. 147 (1): 93–141. doi:10.2307/120984. JSTOR 120984.
- Lubotzky, Alexander; Mozes, Shahar; Raghunathan, M. S. (2000). "The word and Riemannian metrics on lattices of semisimple groups". Publications Mathématiques de l'IHÉS. 91: 5–53. doi:10.1007/BF02698740.
- Burger, Marc; Mozes, Shahar (2000). "Groups acting on trees: from local to global structure" (PDF). Publications Mathématiques de l'IHÉS. 92: 113–150. doi:10.1007/BF02698915.
- Burger, Marc; Mozes, Shahar (2000). "Lattices in product of trees" (PDF). Publications Mathématiques de l'IHÉS. 92: 151–194. doi:10.1007/BF02698916.
- Eskin, Alex; Mozes, Shahar; Oh, Hee (2002). "Uniform exponential growth for linear groups". International Mathematics Research Notices. 2002 (31): 1675–1683. arXiv:math/0108157. doi:10.1155/S1073792802108099. ISSN 1073-7928.
- Glasner, Yair; Mozes, Shahar (2005). "Automata and Square Complexes". Geometriae Dedicata. 111: 43–64. arXiv:math/0306259. doi:10.1007/s10711-004-1815-2.
- Druţu, Cornelia; Mozes, Shahar; Sapir, Mark (2009). "Divergence in lattices in semisimple Lie groups and graphs of groups". Transactions of the American Mathematical Society. 362 (5): 2451–2505. arXiv:0801.4141. doi:10.1090/S0002-9947-09-04882-X.
- Bourgain, Jean; Furman, Alex; Lindenstrauss, Elon; Mozes, Shahar (2011). "Stationary measures and equidistribution for orbits of nonabelian semigroups on the torus". Journal of the American Mathematical Society. 24: 231–280. doi:10.1090/S0894-0347-2010-00674-1.
