= Bianchi group =

Mathematical group

In mathematics, a Bianchi group is a group of the form
$$\text{PSL}_2(\mathcal{O}_d)$$
where d is a positive square-free integer. Here, $\text{PSL}_2$ denotes the projective special linear group and $\mathcal{O}_d$ is the ring of integers of the imaginary quadratic field $\mathbb{Q}(\sqrt{-d})$.

The groups were first studied by Bianchi (1892) as a natural class of discrete subgroups of $\text{PSL}_2(\mathbb{C})$, now termed Kleinian groups.

== Geometry ==
As a subgroup of $\text{PSL}_2(\mathbb{C})$, a Bianchi group acts by orientation-preserving isometries on three-dimensional hyperbolic space $\mathbb{H}^3$. The quotient
$$M_d=\text{PSL}_2(\mathcal{O}_d)\backslash\mathbb{H}^3$$
is a non-compact, hyperbolic 3-fold of finite volume, called a Bianchi orbifold. An exact formula for its volume in terms of the Dedekind zeta function of the underlying imaginary quadratic field was computed by Humbert. If $D$ is the discriminant of $\mathbb{Q}(\sqrt{-d})$, then
$$\operatorname{vol}(M_d)=\frac{|D|^{3/2}}{4\pi^2}\zeta_{\mathbb{Q}(\sqrt{-d})}(2).$$

The cusps of $M_d$ are in bijection with the ideal classes of $\mathbb{Q}(\sqrt{-d})$. Consequently, the number of cusps is equal to the class number of the field.

== Arithmetic properties ==
Bianchi groups are arithmetic Kleinian groups. Every non-cocompact arithmetic Kleinian group is commensurable, up to conjugacy in $\text{PSL}_2(\mathbb{C})$, with a Bianchi group.
