= Superrigidity =

Group theory concept

In mathematics, in the theory of discrete groups, superrigidity is a concept designed to show how a linear representation ρ of a discrete group Γ inside an algebraic group G can, under some circumstances, be as good as a representation of G itself. That this phenomenon happens for certain broadly defined classes of lattices inside semisimple groups was the discovery of Grigory Margulis, who proved some fundamental results in this direction.

There is more than one result that goes by the name of Margulis superrigidity. One simplified statement is this: take G to be a simply connected semisimple real algebraic group in GL_{n}, such that the Lie group of its real points has real rank at least 2 and no compact factors. Suppose Γ is an irreducible lattice in G. For a local field F and ρ a linear representation of the lattice Γ of the Lie group, into GL_{n} (F), assume the image ρ(Γ) is not relatively compact (in the topology arising from F) and such that its closure in the Zariski topology is connected. Then F is the real numbers or the complex numbers, and there is a rational representation of G giving rise to ρ by restriction.

== See also ==
- Mostow rigidity theorem
- Local rigidity
