= Commensurability (group theory) =

Equivalence relation of groups

In mathematics, specifically in group theory, two groups are commensurable if they differ only by a finite amount, in a precise sense. The commensurator of a subgroup is another subgroup, related to the normalizer.

== Abstract commensurability ==
Two groups G_{1} and G_{2} are said to be (abstractly) commensurable if there are subgroups H_{1} ⊂ G_{1} and H_{2} ⊂ G_{2} of finite index such that H_{1} is isomorphic to H_{2}. For example:

- A group is finite if and only if it is commensurable with the trivial group.
- Any two finitely generated free groups on at least 2 generators are commensurable with each other. The group SL(2,Z) is also commensurable with these free groups.
- Any two surface groups of genus at least 2 are commensurable with each other.

In geometric group theory, a finitely generated group is viewed as a metric space using the word metric. If two groups are (abstractly) commensurable, then they are quasi-isometric. It has been fruitful to ask when the converse holds.

== Commensurability of subgroups ==
A different but related notion is used for subgroups of a given group. Namely, two subgroups Γ_{1} and Γ_{2} of a group G are said to be commensurable if the intersection Γ_{1} ∩ Γ_{2} is of finite index in both Γ_{1} and Γ_{2}. Clearly this implies that Γ_{1} and Γ_{2} are abstractly commensurable.

Example: for nonzero real numbers a and b, the subgroup of R generated by a is commensurable with the subgroup generated by b if and only if the real numbers a and b are commensurable, meaning that a/b belongs to the rational numbers Q. If a and b are commensurable, with smallest positive common integer multiple c, then $\langle a \rangle \cap \langle b \rangle = \langle c \rangle$, which has index c/|a| in $\langle a \rangle$ and c/|b| in $\langle b \rangle$.

== Related notions ==
=== In linear algebra ===
There is an analogous notion in linear algebra: two linear subspaces S and T of a vector space V are commensurable if the intersection S ∩ T has finite codimension in both S and T.

=== In topology ===
Two path-connected topological spaces are sometimes called commensurable if they have homeomorphic finite-sheeted covering spaces. Depending on the type of space under consideration, one might want to use homotopy equivalences or diffeomorphisms instead of homeomorphisms in the definition. By the relation between covering spaces and the fundamental group, commensurable spaces have commensurable fundamental groups.

Example: the Gieseking manifold is commensurable with the complement of the figure-eight knot; these are both noncompact hyperbolic 3-manifolds of finite volume. On the other hand, there are infinitely many different commensurability classes of compact hyperbolic 3-manifolds, and also of noncompact hyperbolic 3-manifolds of finite volume.

== Commensurators ==
The commensurator of a subgroup Γ of a group G, denoted Comm_{G}(Γ), is the set of elements g of G that such that the conjugate subgroup gΓg^{−1} is commensurable with Γ. In other words,

$$\operatorname{Comm}_G(\Gamma)=\{g\in G : g\Gamma g^{-1} \cap \Gamma \text{ has finite index in both } \Gamma \text{ and } g\Gamma g^{-1}\}.$$

This is a subgroup of G that contains the normalizer N_{G}(Γ) (and hence contains Γ).

For example, the commensurator of the special linear group SL(n,Z) in SL(n,R) contains SL(n,Q). In particular, the commensurator of SL(n,Z) in SL(n,R) is dense in SL(n,R). More generally, Grigory Margulis showed that the commensurator of a lattice Γ in a semisimple Lie group G is dense in G if and only if Γ is an arithmetic subgroup of G.

== Abstract commensurators ==
The abstract commensurator of a group $G$, denoted $\text{Comm}(G)$, is the group of equivalence classes of isomorphisms $\phi : H \to K$, where $H$ and $K$ are finite index subgroups of $G$, under composition. Elements of $\text{Comm}(G)$ are called commensurators of $G$.

If $G$ is a connected semisimple Lie group not isomorphic to $\text{PSL}_2(\mathbb{R})$, with trivial center and no compact factors, then by the Mostow rigidity theorem, the abstract commensurator of any irreducible lattice $\Gamma \leq G$ is linear. Moreover, if $\Gamma$ is arithmetic, then Comm$(\Gamma)$ is virtually isomorphic to a dense subgroup of $G$, otherwise Comm$(\Gamma)$ is virtually isomorphic to $\Gamma$.
