= Lattice (discrete subgroup) =

Discrete subgroup in a locally compact topological group

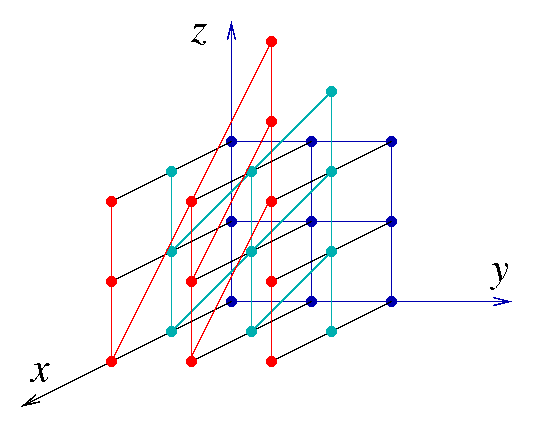
A portion of the discrete Heisenberg group, a discrete subgroup of the continuous Heisenberg Lie group. (The coloring and edges are only for visual aid.)

In Lie theory and related areas of mathematics, a lattice in a locally compact group is a discrete subgroup with the property that the quotient space has finite invariant measure. In the special case of subgroups of R^{n}, this amounts to the usual geometric notion of a lattice as a periodic subset of points, and both the algebraic structure of lattices and the geometry of the space of all lattices are relatively well understood.

The theory is particularly rich for lattices in semisimple Lie groups or more generally in semisimple algebraic groups over local fields. In particular there is a wealth of rigidity results in this setting, and a celebrated theorem of Grigory Margulis states that in most cases all lattices are obtained as arithmetic groups.

Lattices are also well-studied in some other classes of groups, in particular groups associated to Kac–Moody algebras and automorphisms groups of regular trees (the latter are known as tree lattices).

Lattices are of interest in many areas of mathematics: geometric group theory (as particularly nice examples of discrete groups), in differential geometry (through the construction of locally homogeneous manifolds), in number theory (through arithmetic groups), in ergodic theory (through the study of homogeneous flows on the quotient spaces) and in combinatorics (through the construction of expanding Cayley graphs and other combinatorial objects).

== Generalities on lattices ==
=== Informal discussion ===
Lattices are best thought of as discrete approximations of continuous groups (such as Lie groups). For example, it is intuitively clear that the subgroup $\mathbb Z^n$ of integer vectors "looks like" the real vector space $\mathbb R^n$ in some sense, while both groups are essentially different: one is finitely generated and countable, while the other is not finitely generated and has the cardinality of the continuum.

Rigorously defining the meaning of "approximation of a continuous group by a discrete subgroup" in the previous paragraph in order to get a notion generalising the example $\mathbb Z^n \subset \mathbb R^n$ is a matter of what it is designed to achieve. Maybe the most obvious idea is to say that a subgroup "approximates" a larger group is that the larger group can be covered by the translates of a "small" subset by all elements in the subgroups. In a locally compact topological group there are two immediately available notions of "small": topological (a compact, or relatively compact subset) or measure-theoretical (a subset of finite Haar measure). Note that since the Haar measure is a Radon measure, so it gives finite mass to compact subsets, the second definition is more general. The definition of a lattice used in mathematics relies upon the second meaning (in particular to include such examples as $\mathrm{SL}_2(\mathbb Z) \subset \mathrm{SL}_2(\mathbb R)$) but the first also has its own interest (such lattices are called uniform).

Other notions are coarse equivalence and the stronger quasi-isometry. Uniform lattices are quasi-isometric to their ambient groups, but non-uniform ones are not even coarsely equivalent to it.

=== Definition ===
Let $G$ be a locally compact group and $\Gamma$ a discrete subgroup (this means that there exists a neighbourhood $U$ of the identity element $e_G$ of $G$ such that $\Gamma \cap U = \{ e_G \}$). Then $\Gamma$ is called a lattice in $G$ if in addition there exists a Borel measure $\mu$ on the quotient space $G / \Gamma$ which is finite (i.e. $\mu(G / \Gamma) < +\infty$) and $G$-invariant (meaning that for any $g \in G$ and any open subset $W \subset G / \Gamma$ the equality $\mu(gW) = \mu(W)$ is satisfied).

A slightly more sophisticated formulation is as follows: suppose in addition that $G$ is unimodular, then since $\Gamma$ is discrete it is also unimodular and by general theorems there exists a unique $G$-invariant Borel measure on $G / \Gamma$ up to scaling. Then $\Gamma$ is a lattice if and only if this measure is finite.

In the case of discrete subgroups this invariant measure coincides locally with the Haar measure and hence a discrete subgroup in a locally compact group $G$ being a lattice is equivalent to it having a fundamental domain (for the action on $G$ by left-translations) of finite volume for the Haar measure.

A lattice $\Gamma \subset G$ is called uniform (or cocompact) when the quotient space $G/\Gamma$ is compact (and non-uniform otherwise). Equivalently a discrete subgroup $\Gamma \subset G$ is a uniform lattice if and only if there exists a compact subset $C \subset G$ with $G = \bigcup {}_{\gamma \in \Gamma} \, C\gamma$. Note that if $\Gamma$ is any discrete subgroup in $G$ such that $G/\Gamma$ is compact then $\Gamma$ is automatically a lattice in $G$.

=== First examples ===
The fundamental, and simplest, example is the subgroup $\mathbb Z^n$ which is a lattice in the Lie group $\mathbb R^n$. A slightly more complicated example is given by the discrete Heisenberg group inside the continuous Heisenberg group.

If $G$ is a discrete group then a lattice in $G$ is exactly a subgroup $\Gamma$ of finite index (i.e. the quotient set $G/\Gamma$ is finite).

All of these examples are uniform. A non-uniform example is given by the modular group $\mathrm{SL}_2(\mathbb Z)$ inside $\mathrm{SL}_2(\mathbb R)$, and also by the higher-dimensional analogues $\mathrm{SL}_n(\mathbb Z) \subset \mathrm{SL}_n(\mathbb R)$.

Any finite-index subgroup of a lattice is also a lattice in the same group. More generally, a subgroup commensurable to a lattice is a lattice.

=== Which groups have lattices? ===
Not every locally compact group contains a lattice, and there is no general group-theoretical sufficient condition for this. On the other hand, there are plenty of more specific settings where such criteria exist. For example, the existence or non-existence of lattices in Lie groups is a well-understood topic.

As we mentioned, a necessary condition for a group to contain a lattice is that the group must be unimodular. This allows for the easy construction of groups without lattices, for example the group of invertible upper triangular matrices or the affine groups. It is also not very hard to find unimodular groups without lattices, for example certain nilpotent Lie groups as explained below.

A stronger condition than unimodularity is simplicity. This is sufficient to imply the existence of a lattice in a Lie group, but in the more general setting of locally compact groups there exist simple groups without lattices, for example the "Neretin groups".

== Lattices in solvable Lie groups ==
=== Nilpotent Lie groups ===
For nilpotent groups the theory simplifies much from the general case, and stays similar to the case of Abelian groups. All lattices in a nilpotent Lie group are uniform, and if $N$ is a connected simply connected nilpotent Lie group (equivalently it does not contain a nontrivial compact subgroup) then a discrete subgroup is a lattice if and only if it is not contained in a proper connected subgroup (this generalises the fact that a discrete subgroup in a vector space is a lattice if and only if it spans the vector space).

A nilpotent Lie group $N$ contains a lattice if and only if the Lie algebra $\mathfrak n$ of $N$ can be defined over the rationals. That is, if and only if the structure constants of $\mathfrak n$ are rational numbers. More precisely: if $N$ is a nilpotent simply connected Lie group whose Lie algebra $\mathfrak n$ has only rational structure constants, and $L$ is a lattice in $\mathfrak n$ (in the more elementary sense of Lattice (group)) then $\exp(L)$ generates a lattice in $N$; conversely, if $\Gamma$ is a lattice in $N$ then $\exp^{-1}(\Gamma)$ generates a lattice in $\mathfrak n$.

A lattice in a nilpotent Lie group $N$ is always finitely generated (and hence finitely presented since it is itself nilpotent); in fact it is generated by at most $\dim(N)$ elements.

Finally, a nilpotent group is isomorphic to a lattice in a nilpotent Lie group if and only if it contains a subgroup of finite index which is torsion-free and finitely generated.

=== The general case ===
The criterion for nilpotent Lie groups to have a lattice given above does not apply to more general solvable Lie groups. It remains true that any lattice in a solvable Lie group is uniform and that lattices in solvable groups are finitely presented.

Not all finitely generated solvable groups are lattices in a Lie group. An algebraic criterion is that the group be polycyclic.

== Lattices in semisimple Lie groups ==
=== Arithmetic groups and existence of lattices ===
If $G$ is a semisimple linear algebraic group in $\mathrm{GL}_n(\mathbb R)$ which is defined over the field $\mathbb Q$ of rational numbers (i.e. the polynomial equations defining $G$ have their coefficients in $\mathbb Q$) then it has a subgroup $\Gamma = G \cap \mathrm{GL}_n(\mathbb Z)$. A fundamental theorem of Armand Borel and Harish-Chandra states that $\Gamma$ is always a lattice in $G$; the simplest example of this is the subgroup $\mathrm{SL}_2(\mathbb Z) \subset \mathrm{SL}_2(\mathbb R)$.

Generalising the construction above one gets the notion of an arithmetic lattice in a semisimple Lie group. Since all semisimple Lie groups can be defined over $\mathbb Q$ a consequence of the arithmetic construction is that any semisimple Lie group contains a lattice.

=== Irreducibility ===
When the Lie group $G$ splits as a product $G = G_1 \times G_2$ there is an obvious construction of lattices in $G$ from the smaller groups: if $\Gamma_1 \subset G_1, \Gamma_2 \subset G_2$ are lattices then $\Gamma_1 \times \Gamma_2 \subset G$ is a lattice as well. Roughly, a lattice is then said to be irreducible if it does not come from this construction.

More formally, if $G = G_1 \times \ldots \times G_r$ is the decomposition of $G$ into simple factors, a lattice $\Gamma \subset G$ is said to be irreducible if either of the following equivalent conditions hold:

- The projection of $\Gamma$ to any factor $G_{i_1} \times \ldots \times G_{i_k}$ is dense;
- The intersection of $\Gamma$ with any factor $G_{i_1} \times \ldots \times G_{i_k}$ is not a lattice.

An example of an irreducible lattice is given by the subgroup $\mathrm{SL}_2(\mathbb Z[\sqrt 2])$ which we view as a subgroup $\mathrm{SL}_2(\mathbb R) \times \mathrm{SL}_2(\mathbb R)$ via the map $g \mapsto (g, \sigma(g))$ where $\sigma$ is the Galois map sending a matric with coefficients $a_i+b_i\sqrt 2$ to $a_i - b_i \sqrt 2$.

=== Rank 1 versus higher rank ===
The real rank of a Lie group $G$ is the maximal dimension of a $\mathbb R$-split torus of $G$ (an abelian subgroup containing only semisimple elements with at least one real eigenvalue distinct from $\pm 1$). The semisimple Lie groups of real rank 1 without compact factors are (up to isogeny) those in the following list (see List of simple Lie groups):

- The orthogonal groups $\mathrm{SO}(n,1)$ of real quadratic forms of signature $(n, 1)$ for $n \ge 2$;
- The unitary groups $\mathrm{SU}(n,1)$ of Hermitian forms of signature $(n, 1)$ for $n \ge 2$;
- The groups $\mathrm{Sp}(n,1)$ (groups of matrices with quaternion coefficients which preserve a "quaternionic quadratic form" of signature $(n, 1)$) for $n \ge 2$;
- The exceptional Lie group $F_4^{-20}$ (the real form of rank 1 corresponding to the exceptional Lie algebra $F_4$).

The real rank of a Lie group has a significant influence on the behaviour of the lattices it contains. In particular the behaviour of lattices in the first two families of groups (and to a lesser extent that of lattices in the latter two) differs much from that of irreducible lattices in groups of higher rank. For example:

- There exists non-arithmetic lattices in all groups $\mathrm{SO}(n,1)$, in $\mathrm{SU}(2,1),\mathrm{SU}(3,1)$, and possibly in $\mathrm{SU}(n,1), n \ge 4$ (the last is an open question) but all irreducible lattices in the others are arithmetic;
- Lattices in rank 1 Lie groups have infinite, infinite index normal subgroups while all normal subgroups of irreducible lattices in higher rank are either of finite index or contained in their center;
- Conjecturally, arithmetic lattices in higher-rank groups have the congruence subgroup property but there are many lattices in $\mathrm{SO}(n,1), \mathrm{SU}(n,1)$ which have non-congruence finite-index subgroups.

=== Kazhdan's property (T) ===
The property known as (T) was introduced by Kazhdan to study the algebraic structure lattices in certain Lie groups when the classical, more geometric methods failed or at least were not as efficient. The fundamental result when studying lattices is the following:

A lattice in a locally compact group has property (T) if and only if the group itself has property (T).

Using harmonic analysis it is possible to classify semisimple Lie groups according to whether or not they have the property. As a consequence we get the following result, further illustrating the dichotomy of the previous section:

- Lattices in $\mathrm{SO}(n,1), \mathrm{SU}(n,1)$ do not have Kazhdan's property (T) while irreducible lattices in all other simple Lie groups do;

=== Finiteness properties ===
Lattices in semisimple Lie groups are always finitely presented, and actually satisfy stronger finiteness conditions. For uniform lattices this is a direct consequence of cocompactness. In the non-uniform case this can be proved using reduction theory. It is easier to prove finite presentability for groups with Property (T); however, there is a geometric proof which works for all semisimple Lie groups.

== Riemannian manifolds associated to lattices in Lie groups ==
=== Left-invariant metrics ===
If $G$ is a Lie group then from an inner product $g_e$ on the tangent space $\mathfrak g$ (the Lie algebra of $G$) one can construct a Riemannian metric on $G$ as follows: if $v, w$ belong to the tangent space at a point $\gamma \in G$ put $g_\gamma(v, w) = g_e(\gamma^*v, \gamma^*w)$ where $\gamma^*$ indicates the tangent map (at $\gamma$) of the diffeomorphism $x \mapsto \gamma^{-1}x$ of $G$.

The maps $x \mapsto \gamma x$ for $\gamma \in G$ are by definition isometries for this metric $g$. In particular, if $\Gamma$ is any discrete subgroup in $G$ (so that it acts freely and properly discontinuously by left-translations on $G$) the quotient $\Gamma \backslash G$ is a Riemannian manifold locally isometric to $G$ with the metric $g$.

The Riemannian volume form associated to $g$ defines a Haar measure on $G$ and we see that the quotient manifold is of finite Riemannian volume if and only if $\Gamma$ is a lattice.

Interesting examples in this class of Riemannian spaces include compact flat manifolds and nilmanifolds.

=== Locally symmetric spaces ===
A natural bilinear form on $\mathfrak g$ is given by the Killing form. If $G$ is not compact it is not definite and hence not an inner product: however when $G$ is semisimple and $K$ is a maximal compact subgroup it can be used to define a $G$-invariant metric on the homogeneous space $X = G/K$: such Riemannian manifolds are called symmetric spaces of non-compact type without Euclidean factors.

A subgroup $\Gamma \subset G$ acts freely, properly discontinuously on $X$ if and only if it is discrete and torsion-free. The quotients $\Gamma \backslash X$ are called locally symmetric spaces. There is thus a bijective correspondence between complete locally symmetric spaces locally isomorphic to $X$ and of finite Riemannian volume, and torsion-free lattices in $G$. This correspondence can be extended to all lattices by adding orbifolds on the geometric side.

== Lattices in p-adic Lie groups ==
A class of groups with similar properties (with respect to lattices) to real semisimple Lie groups are semisimple algebraic groups over local fields of characteristic 0, for example the p-adic fields $\mathbb Q_p$. There is an arithmetic construction similar to the real case, and the dichotomy between higher rank and rank one also holds in this case, in a more marked form. Let $G$ be an algebraic group over $\mathbb Q_p$ of split-$\mathbb Q_p$-rank r. Then:

- If r is at least 2 all irreducible lattices in $G$ are arithmetic;
- if r=1 then there are uncountably many commensurability classes of non-arithmetic lattices.

In the latter case all lattices are in fact free groups (up to finite index).

=== S-arithmetic groups ===
More generally one can look at lattices in groups of the form

$$G = \prod_{p \in S} G_p$$

where $G_p$ is a semisimple algebraic group over $\mathbb Q_p$. Usually $p=\infty$ is allowed, in which case $G_\infty$ is a real Lie group. An example of such a lattice is given by

$$\mathrm{SL}_2 \left( \mathbb Z \left[\frac 1 p \right] \right) \subset \mathrm{SL}_2(\mathbb R) \times \mathrm{SL}_2(\mathbb Q_p)$$.

This arithmetic construction can be generalised to obtain the notion of an S-arithmetic group. The Margulis arithmeticity theorem applies to this setting as well. In particular, if at least two of the factors $G_p$ are noncompact then any irreducible lattice in $G$ is S-arithmetic.

=== Lattices in adelic groups ===
If $\mathrm G$ is a semisimple algebraic group over a number field $F$ and $\mathbb A$ its adèle ring then the group $G = \mathrm G(\mathbb A)$ of adélic points is well-defined (modulo some technicalities) and it is a locally compact group which naturally contains the group $\mathrm G(F)$ of $F$-rational point as a discrete subgroup. The Borel–Harish-Chandra theorem extends to this setting, and $\mathrm G(F) \subset \mathrm G(\mathbb A)$ is a lattice.

The strong approximation theorem relates the quotient $\mathrm G(F) \backslash \mathrm G(\mathbb A)$ to more classical S-arithmetic quotients. This fact makes the adèle groups very effective as tools in the theory of automorphic forms. In particular modern forms of the trace formula are usually stated and proven for adélic groups rather than for Lie groups.

== Rigidity ==
=== Rigidity results ===
Another group of phenomena concerning lattices in semisimple algebraic groups is collectively known as rigidity. Here are three classical examples of results in this category.

Local rigidity results state that in most situations every subgroup which is sufficiently "close" to a lattice (in the intuitive sense, formalised by Chabauty topology or by the topology on a character variety) is actually conjugated to the original lattice by an element of the ambient Lie group. A consequence of local rigidity and the Kazhdan-Margulis theorem is Wang's theorem: in a given group (with a fixed Haar measure), for any v>0 there are only finitely many (up to conjugation) lattices with covolume bounded by v.

The Mostow rigidity theorem states that for lattices in simple Lie groups not locally isomorphic to $\mathrm{SL}_2(\mathbb R)$ (the group of 2 by 2 matrices with determinant 1) any isomorphism of lattices is essentially induced by an isomorphism between the groups themselves. In particular, a lattice in a Lie group "remembers" the ambient Lie group through its group structure. The first statement is sometimes called strong rigidity and is due to George Mostow and Gopal Prasad (Mostow proved it for cocompact lattices and Prasad extended it to the general case).

Superrigidity provides (for Lie groups and algebraic groups over local fields of higher rank) a strengthening of both local and strong rigidity, dealing with arbitrary homomorphisms from a lattice in an algebraic group G into another algebraic group H. It was proven by Grigori Margulis and is an essential ingredient in the proof of his arithmeticity theorem.

=== Nonrigidity in low dimensions ===
The only semisimple Lie groups for which Mostow rigidity does not hold are all groups locally isomorphic to $\mathrm{PSL}_2(\mathbb R)$. In this case there are in fact continuously many lattices and they give rise to Teichmüller spaces.

Nonuniform lattices in the group $\mathrm{PSL}_2(\mathbb C)$ are not locally rigid. In fact they are accumulation points (in the Chabauty topology) of lattices of smaller covolume, as demonstrated by hyperbolic Dehn surgery.

As lattices in rank-one p-adic groups are virtually free groups they are very non-rigid.

== Tree lattices ==
=== Definition ===
Let $T$ be a tree with a cocompact group of automorphisms; for example, $T$ can be a regular or biregular tree. The group of automorphisms $\mathrm{Aut}(T)$ of $T$ is a locally compact group (when endowed with the compact-open topology, in which a basis of neighbourhoods of the identity is given by the stabilisers of finite subtrees, which are compact). Any group which is a lattice in some $\mathrm{Aut}(T)$ is then called a tree lattice.

The discreteness in this case is easy to see from the group action on the tree: a subgroup of $\mathrm{Aut}(T)$ is discrete if and only if all vertex stabilisers are finite groups.

It is easily seen from the basic theory of group actions on trees that uniform tree lattices are virtually free groups. Thus the more interesting tree lattices are the non-uniform ones, equivalently those for which the quotient graph $\Gamma \backslash T$ is infinite. The existence of such lattices is not easy to see.

=== Tree lattices from algebraic groups ===
If $F$ is a local field of positive characteristic (i.e. a completion of a function field of a curve over a finite field, for example the field of formal Laurent power series $\mathbb F_p((t))$) and $G$ an algebraic group defined over $F$ of $F$-split rank one, then any lattice in $G$ is a tree lattice through its action on the Bruhat–Tits building which in this case is a tree. In contrast to the characteristic 0 case such lattices can be nonuniform, and in this case they are never finitely generated.

=== Tree lattices from Bass–Serre theory ===
If $\Gamma$ is the fundamental group of an infinite graph of groups, all of whose vertex groups are finite, and under additional necessary assumptions on the index of the edge groups and the size of the vertex groups, then the action of $\Gamma$ on the Bass-Serre tree associated to the graph of groups realises it as a tree lattice.

=== Existence criterion ===
More generally one can ask the following question: if $H$ is a closed subgroup of $\mathrm{Aut}(T)$, under which conditions does $H$ contain a lattice? The existence of a uniform lattice is equivalent to $H$ being unimodular and the quotient $H \backslash T$ being finite. The general existence theorem is more subtle: it is necessary and sufficient that $H$ be unimodular, and that the quotient $H \backslash T$ be of "finite volume" in a suitable sense (which can be expressed combinatorially in terms of the action of $H$), more general than the stronger condition that the quotient be finite (as proven by the very existence of nonuniform tree lattices).
