= Local rigidity =

Class of algebraic theorems

Local rigidity theorems in the theory of discrete subgroups of Lie groups are results which show that small deformations of certain such subgroups are always trivial. It is different from Mostow rigidity and weaker (but holds more frequently) than superrigidity.

== History ==
The first such theorem was proven by Atle Selberg for co-compact discrete subgroups of the unimodular groups $\mathrm{SL}_n(\mathbb R)$. Shortly afterwards a similar statement was proven by Eugenio Calabi in the setting of fundamental groups of compact hyperbolic manifolds. Finally, the theorem was extended to all co-compact subgroups of semisimple Lie groups by André Weil. The extension to non-cocompact lattices was made later by Howard Garland and Madabusi Santanam Raghunathan. The result is now sometimes referred to as Calabi—Weil (or just Weil) rigidity.

== Statement ==
=== Deformations of subgroups ===
Let $\Gamma$ be a group generated by a finite number of elements $g_1, \ldots, g_n$ and $G$ a Lie group. Then the map $\mathrm{Hom}(\Gamma, G) \to G^n$ defined by $\rho \mapsto (\rho(g_1), \ldots, \rho(g_n))$ is injective and this endows $\mathrm{Hom}(\Gamma, G)$ with a topology induced by that of $G^n$. If $\Gamma$ is a subgroup of $G$ then a deformation of $\Gamma$ is any element in $\mathrm{Hom}(\Gamma, G)$. Two representations $\phi, \psi$ are said to be conjugated if there exists a $g \in G$ such that $\phi(\gamma) = g\psi(\gamma) g^{-1}$ for all $\gamma \in \Gamma$. See also character variety.

=== Lattices in simple groups not of type A1 or A1 × A1 ===
The simplest statement is when $\Gamma$ is a lattice in a simple Lie group $G$ and the latter is not locally isomorphic to $\mathrm{SL}_2(\mathbb R)$ or $\mathrm{SL}_2(\mathbb C)$ and $\Gamma$ (this means that its Lie algebra is not that of one of these two groups).

There exists a neighbourhood $U$ in $\mathrm{Hom}(\Gamma, G)$ of the inclusion $i : \Gamma \subset G$ such that any $\phi \in U$ is conjugated to $i$.

Whenever such a statement holds for a pair $G \supset \Gamma$ we will say that local rigidity holds.

=== Lattices in SL(2,C) ===
Local rigidity holds for cocompact lattices in $\mathrm{SL}_2(\mathbb C)$. A lattice $\Gamma$ in $\mathrm{SL}_2(\mathbb C)$ which is not cocompact has nontrivial deformations coming from Thurston's hyperbolic Dehn surgery theory. However, if one adds the restriction that a representation must send parabolic elements in $\Gamma$ to parabolic elements then local rigidity holds.

=== Lattices in SL(2,R) ===
In this case local rigidity never holds (except cocompact triangle groups). For cocompact lattices a small deformation remains a cocompact lattice but it may not be conjugated to the original one (see Teichmüller space for more detail). Non-cocompact lattices are virtually free and hence have non-lattice deformations.

=== Semisimple Lie groups ===
Local rigidity holds for lattices in semisimple Lie groups providing the latter have no factor of type A1 (i.e. locally isomorphic to $\mathrm{SL}_2(\mathbb R)$ or $\mathrm{SL}_2(\mathbb C)$) or the former is irreducible.

== Other results ==
There are also local rigidity results where the ambient group is changed, even in case where superrigidity fails. For example, if $\Gamma$ is a lattice in the unitary group $\mathrm{SU}(n,1)$ and $n \ge 2$ then the inclusion $\Gamma \subset \mathrm{SU}(n,1) \subset \mathrm{SU}(n+1,1)$ is locally rigid.

A uniform lattice $\Gamma$ in any compactly generated topological group $G$ is topologically locally rigid, in the sense that any sufficiently small deformation $\varphi$ of the inclusion $i : \Gamma \subset G$ is injective and $\varphi(\Gamma)$ is a uniform lattice in $G$. An irreducible uniform lattice in the isometry group of any proper geodesically complete $\mathrm{CAT}(0)$-space not isometric to the hyperbolic plane and without Euclidean factors is locally rigid.

== Proofs of the theorem ==
Weil's original proof is by relating deformations of a subgroup $\Gamma$ in $G$ to the first cohomology group of $\Gamma$ with coefficients in the Lie algebra of $G$, and then showing that this cohomology vanishes for cocompact lattices when $G$ has no simple factor of absolute type A1. A more geometric proof which also work in the non-compact cases uses Charles Ehresmann (and William Thurston's) theory of $(G, X)$ structures.
