= Convergence group =

In mathematics, a convergence group or a discrete convergence group is a group $\Gamma$ acting by homeomorphisms on a compact metrizable space $M$ in a way that generalizes the properties of the action of Kleinian group by Möbius transformations on the ideal boundary $\mathbb S^2$ of the hyperbolic 3-space $\mathbb H^3$. The notion of a convergence group was introduced by Gehring and Martin (1987) and has since found wide applications in geometric topology, quasiconformal analysis, and geometric group theory.

== Formal definition ==
Let $\Gamma$ be a group acting by homeomorphisms on a compact metrizable space $M$. This action is called a convergence action or a discrete convergence action (and then $\Gamma$ is called a convergence group or a discrete convergence group for this action) if for every infinite distinct sequence of elements $\gamma_n \in \Gamma$ there exist a subsequence $\gamma_{n_k}, k=1,2,\dots$ and points $a,b\in M$ such that the maps $\gamma_{n_k}\big|_{M\setminus\{a\}}$ converge uniformly on compact subsets to the constant map sending $M\setminus\{a\}$ to $b$. Here converging uniformly on compact subsets means that for every open neighborhood $U$ of $b$ in $M$ and every compact $K\subset M\setminus \{a\}$ there exists an index $k_0\ge 1$ such that for every $k\ge k_0,$ $\gamma_{n_k}(K)\subseteq U$. Note that the "poles" $a, b\in M$ associated with the subsequence $\gamma_{n_k}$ are not required to be distinct.

=== Reformulation in terms of the action on distinct triples ===
The above definition of convergence group admits a useful equivalent reformulation in terms of the action of $\Gamma$ on the "space of distinct triples" of $M$. For a set $M$ denote $\Theta(M):=M^3\setminus \Delta(M)$, where $\Delta(M)=\{(a,b,c)\in M^3\mid \#\{a,b,c\}\le 2\}$. The set $\Theta(M)$ is called the "space of distinct triples" for $M$.

Then the following equivalence is known to hold:

Let $\Gamma$ be a group acting by homeomorphisms on a compact metrizable space $M$ with at least two points. Then this action is a discrete convergence action if and only if the induced action of $\Gamma$ on $\Theta(M)$ is properly discontinuous.

== Examples ==
- The action of a Kleinian group $\Gamma$ on $\mathbb S^2=\partial \mathbb H^3$ by Möbius transformations is a convergence group action.
- The action of a word-hyperbolic group $G$ by translations on its ideal boundary $\partial G$ is a convergence group action.
- The action of a relatively hyperbolic group $G$ by translations on its Bowditch boundary $\partial G$ is a convergence group action.
- Let $X$ be a proper geodesic Gromov-hyperbolic metric space and let $\Gamma$ be a group acting properly discontinuously by isometries on $X$. Then the corresponding boundary action of $\Gamma$ on $\partial X$ is a discrete convergence action (Lemma 2.11 of).

== Classification of elements in convergence groups ==
Let $\Gamma$ be a group acting by homeomorphisms on a compact metrizable space $M$with at least three points, and let $\gamma\in\Gamma$. Then it is known (Lemma 3.1 in or Lemma 6.2 in) that exactly one of the following occurs:

(1) The element $\gamma$ has finite order in $\Gamma$; in this case $\gamma$ is called elliptic.

(2) The element $\gamma$ has infinite order in $\Gamma$ and the fixed set $\operatorname{Fix}_M(\gamma)$ is a single point; in this case $\gamma$ is called parabolic.

(3) The element $\gamma$ has infinite order in $\Gamma$ and the fixed set $\operatorname{Fix}_M(\gamma)$ consists of two distinct points; in this case $\gamma$ is called loxodromic.

Moreover, for every $p\ne 0$ the elements $\gamma$ and $\gamma^p$have the same type. Also in cases (2) and (3) $\operatorname{Fix}_M(\gamma) = \operatorname{Fix}_M(\gamma^p)$ (where $p\ne 0$) and the group $\langle \gamma\rangle$ acts properly discontinuously on $M\setminus \operatorname{Fix}_M(\gamma)$. Additionally, if $\gamma$ is loxodromic, then $\langle \gamma\rangle$ acts properly discontinuously and cocompactly on $M\setminus \operatorname{Fix}_M(\gamma)$.

If $\gamma\in \Gamma$ is parabolic with a fixed point $a\in M$ then for every $x\in M$ one has $\lim_{n\to\infty}\gamma^nx=\lim_{n\to-\infty}\gamma^nx =a$ If $\gamma\in \Gamma$ is loxodromic, then $\operatorname{Fix}_M(\gamma)$ can be written as $\operatorname{Fix}_M(\gamma)=\{a_-,a_+\}$ so that for every $x \in M\setminus \{a_-\}$ one has $\lim_{n\to\infty}\gamma^nx=a_+$ and for every $x \in M\setminus \{a_+\}$ one has $\lim_{n\to-\infty}\gamma^nx=a_-$, and these convergences are uniform on compact subsets of $M\setminus \{a_-, a_+\}$.

== Uniform convergence groups ==
A discrete convergence action of a group $\Gamma$ on a compact metrizable space $M$ is called uniform (in which case $\Gamma$ is called a uniform convergence group) if the action of $\Gamma$ on $\Theta(M)$ is co-compact. Thus $\Gamma$ is a uniform convergence group if and only if its action on $\Theta(M)$ is both properly discontinuous and co-compact.

=== Conical limit points ===
Let $\Gamma$ act on a compact metrizable space $M$ as a discrete convergence group. A point $x\in M$ is called a conical limit point (sometimes also called a radial limit point or a point of approximation) if there exist an infinite sequence of distinct elements $\gamma_n\in \Gamma$ and distinct points $a,b\in M$ such that $\lim_{n\to\infty}\gamma_n x=a$ and for every $y\in M\setminus \{x\}$ one has $\lim_{n\to\infty}\gamma_n y=b$.

An important result of Tukia, also independently obtained by Bowditch, states:

A discrete convergence group action of a group $\Gamma$ on a compact metrizable space $M$ is uniform if and only if every non-isolated point of $M$ is a conical limit point.

=== Word-hyperbolic groups and their boundaries ===
It was already observed by Gromov that the natural action by translations of a word-hyperbolic group $G$ on its boundary $\partial G$ is a uniform convergence action (see for a formal proof). Bowditch proved an important converse, thus obtaining a topological characterization of word-hyperbolic groups:

Theorem. Let $G$ act as a discrete uniform convergence group on a compact metrizable space $M$ with no isolated points. Then the group $G$ is word-hyperbolic and there exists a $G$-equivariant homeomorphism $M\to \partial G$.

== Convergence actions on the circle ==
An isometric action of a group $G$ on the hyperbolic plane $\mathbb H^2$ is called geometric if this action is properly discontinuous and cocompact. Every geometric action of $G$ on $\mathbb H^2$ induces a uniform convergence action of $G$ on $\mathbb S^1 =\partial H^2\approx \partial G$. An important result of Tukia (1986), Gabai (1992), Casson–Jungreis (1994), and Freden (1995) shows that the converse also holds:

Theorem. If $G$ is a group acting as a discrete uniform convergence group on $\mathbb S^1$ then this action is topologically conjugate to an action induced by a geometric action of $G$ on $\mathbb H^2$ by isometries.

Note that whenever $G$ acts geometrically on $\mathbb H^2$, the group $G$ is virtually a hyperbolic surface group, that is, $G$ contains a finite index subgroup isomorphic to the fundamental group of a closed hyperbolic surface.

== Convergence actions on the 2-sphere ==
One of the equivalent reformulations of Cannon's conjecture, (posed by James W. Cannon, although an earlier and more general conjecture, reducing to the Cannon conjecture for compact type, was given by Gaven J. Martin and Richard K. Skora)

These conjectures are in terms of word-hyperbolic groups with boundaries homeomorphic to $\mathbb S^2$, says that if $G$ is a group acting as a discrete uniform convergence group on $\mathbb S^2$ then this action is topologically conjugate to an action induced by a geometric action of $G$ on $\mathbb H^3$ by isometries. These conjectures still remains open.

== Applications and further generalizations ==
- Yaman gave a characterization of relatively hyperbolic groups in terms of convergence actions, generalizing Bowditch's characterization of word-hyperbolic groups as uniform convergence groups.
- One can consider more general versions of group actions with "convergence property" without the discreteness assumption.
- The most general version of the notion of Cannon–Thurston map, originally defined in the context of Kleinian and word-hyperbolic groups, can be defined and studied in the context of setting of convergence groups.
