= Tukia =

Tukia is a surname. Notable people with the surname include:

- Elias Tukia (1877–1950), Finnish farmer
- Pekka Tukia (born 1945), Finnish mathematician
