= Interlocking directorate =

Corporate boards of directors strategy

Network diagram showing interlocks between various U.S. corporations/institutions, and four major media/telecom corporations (circled in red).

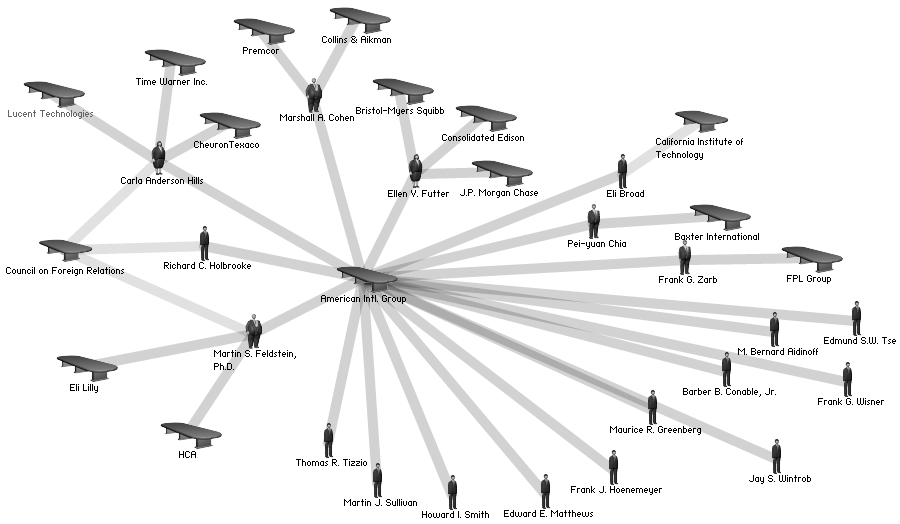
Network diagram showing interlocks of the board members of American International Group (AIG), from 2004 with other U.S. corporations.

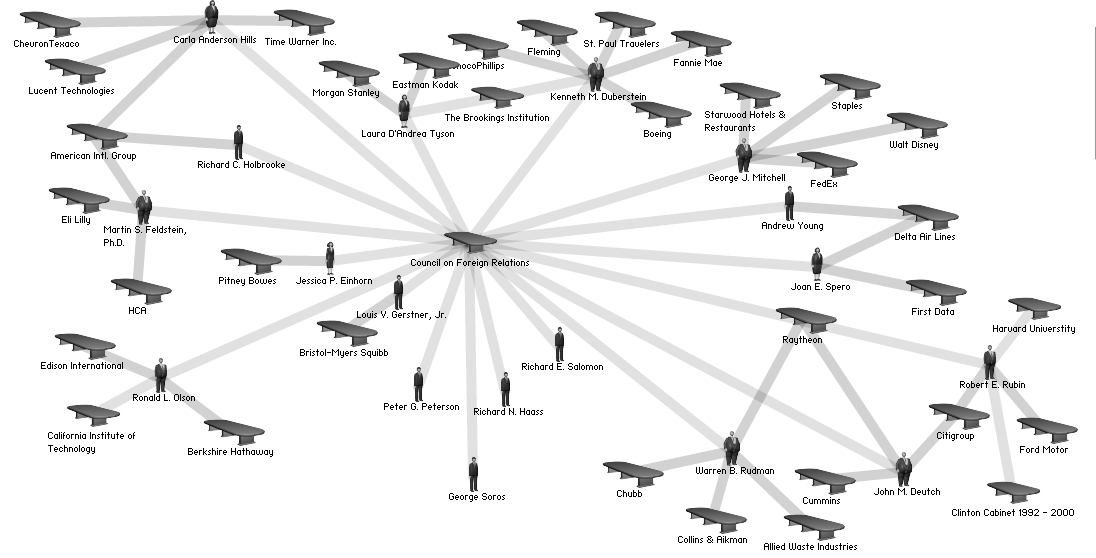
Network diagram showing interlocks between various U.S. corporations and institutions and the Council on Foreign Relations, in 2004

Two or more corporations have interlocking directorates when they share members of their boards of directors or each shares directors with a third firm. A person that sits on multiple boards is known as a multiple director. Two firms have a direct interlock if a director or executive of one firm is also a director of the other, and an indirect interlock if a director of each sits on the board of a third firm.

This practice, although widespread and lawful, raises questions about the quality and independence of board decisions. In the United States, antitrust law prohibits interlocking directorates within the same industry over collusion concerns, though legal observers have noted that this has long been unenforced. In 2022, the Department of Justice signaled it would enforce laws on anti-competitive interlocking directorates, leading to the resignation of seven directors at five companies in October 2022.

== Socio-political importance ==
According to some observers, interlocks allow for cohesion, coordinated action, and unified political-economic power of corporate executives. They allow corporations to increase their influence by exerting power as a group, and to work together towards common goals. They help corporate executives maintain an advantage, and gain more power over workers and consumers, by reducing intra-class competition and increasing cooperation. In the words of Scott R. Bowman, interlocks "facilitate a community of interest among the elite of the corporate world that supplants the competitive and socially divisive ethos of an earlier stage of capitalism with an ethic of cooperation and a sense of shared values and goals."

Interlocks act as communication channels, enabling information to be shared between boards via multiple directors who have access to inside information for multiple companies. The system of interlocks forms what Michael Useem calls a "transcorporate network, overarching all sectors of business". Interlocks have benefits over trusts, cartels, and other monopolistic/oligopolistic forms of organization, due to their greater fluidity, and lower visibility (making them less open to public scrutiny). They also benefit the involved companies, due to reduced competition, increased information availability for directors, and increased prestige.

Some theorists believe that because multiple directors often have interests in firms in different industries, they are more likely to think in terms of general corporate class interests, rather than simply the narrow interests of individual corporations. Also, these individuals tend to come from wealthy backgrounds, socialize with the upper classes, and tend to have worked their way up the corporate hierarchy, making it more likely that they have internalized values that will cause them to personally support policies that are beneficial to business in general.

Furthermore, multiple directors tend to be more frequently appointed to government positions, and sit on more non-profit/foundation boards than other directors. Thus, these individuals (known as the "inner circle" of the corporate class) tend to contribute disproportionately to the policy-planning and government groups that represent the interests of the corporate class, and are the ones that are most likely to deal with general policy issues and handle political problems for the business class as a whole. These individuals and the people around them are often considered to be the "ruling class" in modern politics. However, they do not wield absolute power, and they are not monolithic, often differing on which policies will best serve the interests of the upper classes.

Interlocks not only occur between corporations, but also between corporations and non-profit institutions such as foundations, think tanks, policy-planning groups, and universities. They can also be seen as a subset of connections in a larger upper class social network which includes all of the aforementioned types of institutions as well as elite social clubs, schools, resorts, and gatherings. Multiple directors are "roughly twice as likely as single directors to be in the Social Register, to have attended a prestigious private school, or to belong to an elite social club."

Furthermore, board interlocks can occur in cooperatives that, despite being non-profit organizations, operate commercially in the market. In these organizations, the objective of such interconnections includes an additional dimension focused on maintaining institutional political power, rather than ensuring the preservation of the owners' capital.

== Modern interlock networks ==
Analyses of corporate interlocks have found a high degree of interconnectedness amongst large corporations. It has also been shown that inbound interlocks (i.e. a network link from external firms into a focal firm) have a much greater impact and importance than outbound interlocks, a finding that laid the foundation for further research on inter-organizational networks based on overlapping memberships and other linkages such as joint ventures and patent backward and forward citations. Virtually all large U.S. corporations are linked together in a network of interlocks. Most corporations are within 3 or 4 "steps" from each other within this network. Approximately 15–20% of all directors sit on two or more boards.

The largest corporations tend to have the most interlocks, and also tend to have interlocks with each other, placing them at the center of the network. Major banks, in particular, tend to be at the center of the network and have large numbers of interlocks. With the globalization of financial capital following World War II, multinational interlocks have become progressively more common. As the Cold War escalated, well-connected members of the CIA harnessed these interconnections to launder money through front foundations, as well as more substantial institutions such as the Ford Foundation. A relatively small number of individuals—a few dozen—bind this multinational network together by participating in transnational interlocks and sitting on the boards of multiple global policy groups (such as the Council on Foreign Relations).

== Legality ==
In the United States, Section 8 of the Clayton Act prohibits interlocking directorates by U.S. companies competing in the same industry, if those corporations would violate antitrust laws if combined into a single corporation. However, at least 1 in 8 of the interlocks in the United States are between corporations that are supposedly competitors.

=== Recent reinvigoration of enforcement ===
In 2022, the Department of Justice (DOJ) Antitrust Division signaled it would reinvigorate enforcement against anti-competitive interlocking directorates after decades of dormant enforcement. In October 2022, it was reported that antitrust scrutiny brought on by Assistant Attorney General Jonathan Kanter led to the resignation of seven directors from the boards of five companies. According to Bloomberg News, private equity firms including Blackstone Inc. and Apollo Global Management are currently under federal interlocking directorate scrutiny.

== 1970 graphs ==
In 1979 Levin and Roy reported on interlocking directors at 797 corporations in 1970 where the board of directors ranged from 3 to 47 members, with a mean size of 13. Only 18% of the 8623 directors were on more than one board, though the mean number of interlockers for a corporation was 8. The components of the graph were 62 isolated boards, four pairs of corporations interlocked by one or more directors, a triad of interlocked corporations, and the greater component of 724 corporations. For an arbitrary pair of corporations in this component the median path length was 3. Levin and Roy tested the graph for cut points and failed to find any with their search starting with corporations with large boards.

In a study of clustering in the graph, Levin and Roy demonstrated the use of a bipartite graph with corporations listed on one side and directors with multiple seats on the other. The clusters become evident in a physical model using elastic bands and paper clips. The directors and corporations are listed arbitrarily to begin and the elastic bands placed as edges of the bipartite graph. Then a perusal of the elastics may suggest a re-ordering on one side or the other with the elastics slightly less tense. After some iteration this procedure reveals a cluster structure in the bipartite graph.

== See also ==
- Cartel
- Insider trading
- Oligarchy
- Price fixing
- Revolving door (politics)
- Social class
