= Geometric group action =

In mathematics, specifically geometric group theory, a geometric group action is a certain type of action of a discrete group on a metric space.

== Definition ==
In geometric group theory, a geometry is any proper, geodesic metric space. An action of a finitely-generated group G on a geometry X is geometric if it satisfies the following conditions:

1. Each element of G acts as an isometry of X.
2. The action is cocompact, i.e. the quotient space X/G is a compact space.
3. The action is properly discontinuous, with each point having a finite stabilizer.

== Uniqueness ==
If a group G acts geometrically upon two geometries X and Y, then X and Y are quasi-isometric. Since any group acts geometrically on its own Cayley graph, any space on which G acts geometrically is quasi-isometric to the Cayley graph of G.

== Examples ==
Cannon's conjecture states that any hyperbolic group with a 2-sphere at infinity acts geometrically on hyperbolic 3-space.
