= Elmer Rees =

Welsh mathematician (1941–2019)

Elmer Gethin Rees
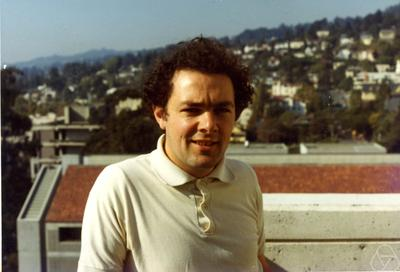
- Born: 19 November 1941; Llandybie, Carmarthenshire, Wales
- Died: 4 October 2019 (aged 77); Bristol, England
- Education: University of Cambridge; University of Warwick
- Scientific career
- Fields: Mathematician
- Workplaces: St Catherine's College, Oxford; University of Edinburgh; Heilbronn Institute for Mathematical Research
- Doctoral advisor: David B. A. Epstein

Elmer Gethin Rees (19 November 1941 – 4 October 2019) was a Welsh mathematician with publications in areas ranging from topology, differential geometry, algebraic geometry, linear algebra and Morse theory to robotics. He held the post of Director of the Heilbronn Institute for Mathematical Research, a partnership between the University of Bristol and the British signals intelligence agency GCHQ, from its creation in 2005 until 2009.

== Biography ==
Rees was born in Llandybie and grew up in Wales. He studied at St Catharine's College, Cambridge gaining a BA before moving on to the University of Warwick, where he completed his PhD in 1967. His thesis on Projective Spaces and Associated Maps, was written under the supervision of David B. A. Epstein.

Rees's career had taken him to University of Hull, the Institute for Advanced Study in Princeton, New Jersey, Swansea University and St Catherine's College, Oxford, before becoming a professor at the University of Edinburgh in 1979, where he remained until retiring from the post in 2005.

He was elected as a fellow of the Royal Society of Edinburgh in 1982. One of his most notable legacies was the establishment of the International Centre for Mathematical Sciences.

Rees was appointed Commander of the Order of the British Empire (CBE) in the 2009 Birthday Honours.

While at the universities of Oxford and Edinburgh, he supervised at least 15 PhD students, including Anthony Bahri, John D. S. Jones, Gregory Lupton, Jacob Mostovoy, Simon Willerton and Richard Hepworth.

== External links and references ==
- Elmer Rees at the Mathematics Genealogy Project
- Senatus Academicus, University of Edinburgh. "Special Minute - Professor Elmer Gethin Rees MA PhD FRSE". Retrieved 2006-10-21.
- University of Edinburgh Honorary Degree (24 June 2008)
- Heilbronn Institute for Mathematical Research
- Elmer Rees 70th birthday conference
- 70th birthday conference poster
