= Acylindrically hyperbolic group =

In the mathematical subject of geometric group theory, an acylindrically hyperbolic group is a group admitting a non-elementary 'acylindrical' isometric action on some geodesic hyperbolic metric space. This notion generalizes the notions of a hyperbolic group and of a relatively hyperbolic group and includes a significantly wider class of examples, such as mapping class groups and Out(F_{n}).

== Formal definition ==
=== Acylindrical action ===
Let G be a group with an isometric action on some geodesic hyperbolic metric space X. This action is called acylindrical if for every $R\ge 0$ there exist $N>0, L>0$ such that for every $x,y\in X$ with $d(x,y)\ge L$ one has
$$\# \{g\in G\mid d(x,gx)\le R, d(y,gy)\le R\} \le N.$$

If the above property holds for a specific $R\ge 0$, the action of G on X is called R-acylindrical. The notion of acylindricity provides a suitable substitute for being a proper action in the more general context where non-proper actions are allowed.

An acylindrical isometric action of a group G on a geodesic hyperbolic metric space X is non-elementary if G admits two independent hyperbolic isometries of X, that is, two loxodromic elements $g,h\in G$ such that their fixed point sets $\{g^+,g^-\}\subseteq \partial X$ and $\{h^+,h^-\}\subseteq \partial X$ are disjoint.

It is known (Theorem 1.1 in) that an acylindrical action of a group G on a geodesic hyperbolic metric space X is non-elementary if and only if this action has unbounded orbits in X and the group G is not a finite extension of a cyclic group generated by loxodromic isometry of X.

=== Acylindrically hyperbolic group ===
A group G is called acylindrically hyperbolic if G admits a non-elementary acylindrical isometric action on some geodesic hyperbolic metric space X.

== Equivalent characterizations ==
It is known (Theorem 1.2 in) that for a group G the following conditions are equivalent:

- The group G is acylindrically hyperbolic.
- There exists a (possibly infinite) generating set S for G, such that the Cayley graph $\Gamma(G,S)$ is hyperbolic, and the natural translation action of G on $\Gamma(G,S)$ is a non-elementary acylindrical action.
- The group G is not virtually cyclic, and there exists an isometric action of G on a geodesic hyperbolic metric space X such that at least one element of G acts on X with the WPD ('Weakly Properly Discontinuous') property.
- The group G contains a proper infinite 'hyperbolically embedded' subgroup.

== Properties ==
- Every acylindrically hyperbolic group G is SQ-universal, that is, every countable group embeds as a subgroup in some quotient group of G.
- The class of acylindrically hyperbolic groups is closed under taking infinite normal subgroups, and, more generally, under taking 's-normal' subgroups. Here a subgroup $H\le G$ is called s-normal in $G$ if for every $g\in G$ one has $|H\cap g^{-1}Hg|=\infty$.
- If G is an acylindrically hyperbolic group and $V=\mathbb R$ or $V=\ell^p(G)$ with $p\in [1,\infty)$ then the bounded cohomology $H_b(G,V)$ is infinite-dimensional.
- Every acylindrically hyperbolic group G admits a unique maximal normal finite subgroup denoted K(G).
- If G is an acylindrically hyperbolic group with K(G)={1} then G has infinite conjugacy classes of nontrivial elements, G is not inner amenable, and the reduced C*-algebra of G is simple with unique trace.
- There is a version of small cancellation theory over acylindrically hyperbolic groups, allowing one to produce many quotients of such groups with prescribed properties.
- Every finitely generated acylindrically hyperbolic group has cut points in all of its asymptotic cones.
- For a finitely generated acylindrically hyperbolic group G, the probability that the simple random walk on G of length n produces a 'generalized loxodromic element' in G converges to 1 exponentially fast as $n\to\infty$.
- Every finitely generated acylindrically hyperbolic group G has exponential conjugacy growth, meaning that the number of distinct conjugacy classes of elements of G coming from the ball of radius n in the Cayley graph of G grows exponentially in n.

== Examples and non-examples ==
- Finite groups, virtually nilpotent groups and virtually solvable groups are not acylindrically hyperbolic.
- Every non-elementary subgroup of a word-hyperbolic group is acylindrically hyperbolic.
- Every non-elementary relatively hyperbolic group is acylindrically hyperbolic.
- The mapping class group $MCG(S_{g,p})$ of a connected oriented surface of genus $g\ge 0$ with $p\ge 0$ punctures is acylindrically hyperbolic, except for the cases where $g=0, p\le 3$ (in those exceptional cases the mapping class group is finite).
- For $n\ge 2$ the group Out(F_{n}) is acylindrically hyperbolic.
- By a result of Osin, every non virtually cyclic group G, that admits a proper isometric action on a proper CAT(0) space with G having at least one rank-1 element, is acylindrically hyperbolic. Caprace and Sageev proved that if G is a finitely generated group acting isometrically properly discontinuously and cocompactly on a geodetically complete CAT(0) cubical complex X, then either X splits as a direct product of two unbounded convex subcomplexes, or G contains a rank-1 element.
- Every right-angled Artin group G, which is not cyclic and which is directly indecomposable, is acylindrically hyperbolic.
- For $n\ge 3$ the special linear group $SL(n,\mathbb Z)$ is not acylindrically hyperbolic (Example 7.5 in).
- For $m\ne 0, n\ne 0$ the Baumslag–Solitar group $BS(m,n)=\langle a,t\mid t^{-1}a^mt=a^n\rangle$ is not acylindrically hyperbolic. (Example 7.4 in)
- Many groups admitting nontrivial actions on simplicial trees (that is, admitting nontrivial splittings as fundamental groups of graphs of groups in the sense of Bass–Serre theory) are acylindrically hyperbolic. For example, all one-relator groups on at least three generators are acylindrically hyperbolic.
- Most 3-manifold groups are acylindrically hyperbolic.
