= International Centre for Mathematical Sciences =

Laboratory in City of Edinburgh, Scotland

Coordinates: 55°57′21″N 3°12′21″W

- President: Professor Paul Glendinning
- Owner: University of Edinburgh, Heriot-Watt University
- Location: Bayes Centre, University of Edinburgh, Edinburgh
- Website: www.icms.org.uk

The International Centre for Mathematical Sciences (ICMS) is a mathematical research centre based in Edinburgh. According to its website, the centre is "designed to bring together mathematicians and practitioners in science, industry and commerce for research workshops and other meetings."

The centre was jointly established in 1990 by the University of Edinburgh and Heriot-Watt University, under the supervision of Professor Elmer Rees, with initial support from Edinburgh District Council, the Scottish Development Agency and the International Centre for Theoretical Physics. Its current operations are primarily funded by grants from the Engineering and Physical Sciences Research Council of the UK.

In April 1994 the Centre moved to 14 India Street, Edinburgh, the birthplace of James Clerk Maxwell and home of the James Clerk Maxwell Foundation. In 2010 it was relocated to 15 South College Street to accommodate larger events. As of 2020, the ICMS is located within the newly established Bayes centre.

The current scientific director (appointed in 2021) is Professor Minhyong Kim. The ICMS is a member of the European Mathematical Society.

== Premises ==
From April 1994, the Centre rented from the James Clerk Maxwell Foundation accommodation at 14, India Street, the birthplace of James Clerk Maxwell. Increased activity necessitated removal in 2010 to a converted church in South College Street, and then in 2018 to its present location in the nearby Bayes Centre of the University of Edinburgh.

== See also ==
- Edinburgh Mathematical Society
- Isaac Newton Institute, Cambridge
