= David B. A. Epstein =

Mathematician (born 1937)

David Epstein FRS
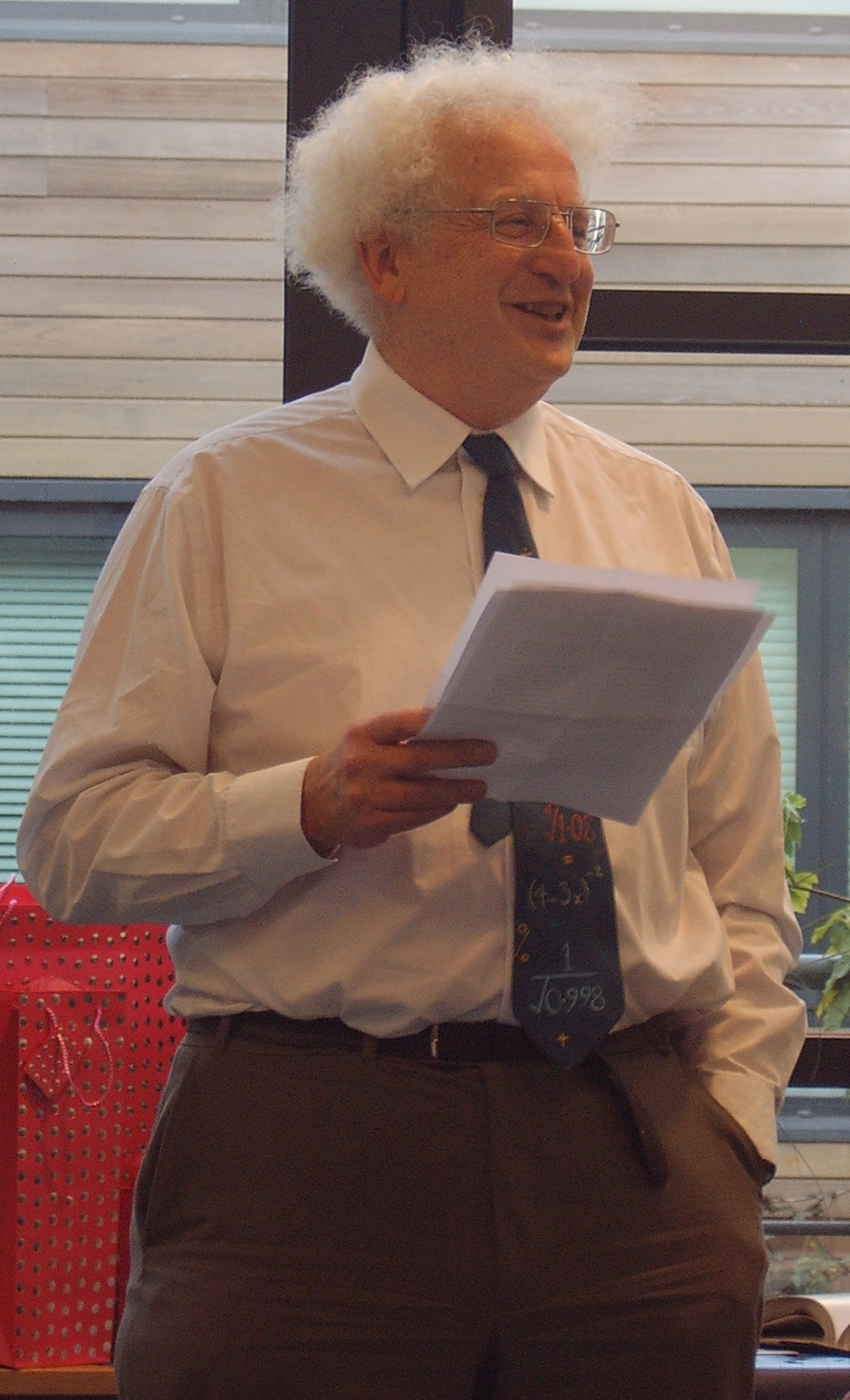
- Epstein in 2009
- Born: David Bernard Alper Epstein; 1937 (age 88–89); South Africa
- Citizenship: South Africa - United Kingdom
- Education: University of Cambridge (PhD)
- Spouse: Rona
- Awards: FRS (2004)
- Scientific career
- Workplaces: University of Warwick
- Thesis: Three Dimensional Manifolds (1960)
- Doctoral advisor: Christopher Zeeman
- Doctoral students: Elmer Rees Brian Bowditch
- Website: homepages.warwick.ac.uk/~masbab

David Bernard Alper Epstein (born 1937) is a mathematician known for his work in hyperbolic geometry, 3-manifolds, and group theory, amongst other fields. He co-founded the University of Warwick mathematics department with Christopher Zeeman and is founding editor of the journal Experimental Mathematics.

== Higher education and early career ==
Epstein was born in South Africa to a Lithuanian-Jewish family. In 1954, Epstein came to the UK after completing his bachelor's degree in mathematics in South Africa. Having received the exemption for Mathematical Tripos part I at the University of Cambridge, he completed Mathematical Tripos part II in 1955 and Mathematical Tripos part III in 1957. He completed his Ph.D. on the topic of three-dimensional manifolds under the supervision of Christopher Zeeman in 1960. He then travelled to Princeton University, where he spent one year attending the lectures of Norman Steenrod on cohomology operations, making notes and revisions to them, later published as a book by the Princeton University Press in 1962.

In 1961, Epstein moved to the Institute for Advanced Study (IAS) in Princeton, New Jersey. He returned to the UK in 1962 to become a research fellow of the newly founded Churchill College, Cambridge. In 1964, he moved to the Mathematics Institute of the University of Warwick to take up a Readership position there. He was the first academic at the University of Warwick to move into local accommodation, though many professors were appointed before him.

== Awards and honours ==
Epstein was awarded the Senior Berwick Prize by the London Mathematical Society in 1988. In 2004 he was elected a Fellow of the Royal Society. In 2012 he became a fellow of the American Mathematical Society.

== Personal life ==
David Epstein was born in 1937 in Pretoria, South Africa to Ben Epstein and Pauline (or Polly) Alper, both Jewish of Lithuanian descent, though Polly was born in South Africa. David finished school at the age of 14, and graduated from the University of the Witwatersrand at the age of 17. He then won a scholarship to the University of Cambridge, where he did Parts II and III of the Mathematical Tripos, graduating in 1957. He married Rona in 1958, after dating her from when he was 16 and she was 14. He did a Ph.D. in Cambridge under Christopher Zeeman, which he completed at the age of 23 in 1960, when he was awarded a Research Fellowship at Trinity College, Cambridge, which he never took up.

After completing his Ph.D., Epstein went to Princeton University for one year, and then to the Institute for Advanced Study in Princeton, New Jersey for another year. He returned to Cambridge in 1962, where he was an assistant lecturer at the university and director of studies at the new Churchill College. In 1963 his younger sister Debbie left South Africa when she was considered to be in danger of arrest by the South African apartheid regime. At this stage, his father Ben was also having severe problems with the South African regime as a result of his ethical stand as a doctor. For example, he was instructed by the hospital administration to stop putting "starvation" as the cause of death on the death certificates of black children, an instruction that he refused to follow. His mother Polly was also active politically against the government. Polly and Ben at first wanted to emigrate to the United States, but they were denied visas, so they emigrated instead to the UK.

== Selected publications ==
- D.B.A. Epstein, Projective planes in 3-manifolds. Proceedings of the London Mathematical Society (3) 11 1961 469–484.
- D.B.A. Epstein and R.L.E. Schwarzenberger, Imbeddings of real projective spaces. Annals of Mathematics (2) 76 1962 180–184.
- D.B.A. Epstein, Steenrod operations in homological algebra. Inventiones Mathematicae 1 1966 152–208.
- D.B.A. Epstein, Periodic flows on three-manifolds. Annals of Mathematics (2) 95 1972 66–82.
- D.B.A. Epstein and E. Vogt, A counterexample to the periodic orbit conjecture in codimension 3. Annals of Mathematics (2) 108 (1978), no. 3, 539–552.
- D.B.A. Epstein and A. Marden, Convex hulls in hyperbolic space, a theorem of Sullivan, and measured pleated surfaces. Analytical and geometric aspects of hyperbolic space (Coventry/Durham, 1984), 113–253, London Math. Soc. Lecture Note Ser., 111, Cambridge University Press, Cambridge, 1987.
- D.B.A. Epstein and R.C. Penner, Euclidean decompositions of noncompact hyperbolic manifolds. Journal of Differential Geometry 27 (1988), no. 1, 67–80.
- Epstein, David B. A.; Cannon, James W.; Holt, Derek F.; Levy, Silvio V. F.; Paterson, Michael S.; Thurston, William P. Word Processing in Groups. Jones and Bartlett Publishers, Boston, MA, 1992. xii+330 pp. ISBN 0-86720-244-0
