= Washington Mio =

Topologist

- Title: Roger W. Roberts Professor in Mathematics

Academic background
- Education: New York University
- Thesis: Non-Linear Equivalent Representations of Quaternionic 2-Groups (1984)
- Doctoral advisor: Sylvain Edward Cappell

Academic work
- Discipline: Mathematics
- Sub-discipline: Geometric topology
- Institutions: Instituto de Matemática Pura e Aplicada (1984-87); University of Pennsylvania (1989-90); Florida State University (1990-present)

Washington Mio is a mathematician specializing in geometric topology and shape analysis. He is a fellow of the American Mathematical Society and served as the chair of Florida State University's mathematics department.

== Career ==
Mio earned his bachelor's degree in mathematics from State University of Campinas, Brazil in 1978. Two years later he finished his M.S. in mathematics from the Instituto de Matemática Pura e Aplicada. Mio completed his Ph.D. at New York University in 1984 with Sylvain Cappell as his advisor. His dissertation was published in the Transactions of the American Mathematical Society.

In 1996 Mio, along with John Bryant, Steven Ferry, and Shmuel Weinberger, disproved James Cannon's influential Resolution Conjecture using surgery theory.

In 2004 Mio, together with Eric Klassen, Anuj Srivastava, and Shantanu H. Joshi, introduced a widely used method for analyzing and automatically classifying shapes based on geodesic paths.

== Awards ==
In 2015, Mio was inducted as a fellow of the American Mathematical Society for "contributions to topology as well as to the mathematics, statistics, and applications of shape analysis."

Florida State University awarded Mio the title of Distinguished Research Professor in 2023 and made him the inaugural Roger W. Roberts Professor of Mathematics in 2024.

== Selected publications ==
- Bryant, J.; Ferry, S.; Mio, W.; Weinberger, S. (1996). "Topology of Homology Manifolds". Annals of Mathematics. 143 (3): 435–467. doi:10.2307/2118532. ISSN 0003-486X. JSTOR 2118532.
- Mio, Washington (2000). Cappell, Sylvain (ed.). Surveys on Surgery Theory: Volume 1. Papers Dedicated to C. T. C. Wall. (AM-145). Princeton University Press. pp. 323–44. ISBN 978-0-691-04938-0. JSTOR j.ctt7zv8q1.18.
