= James W. Cannon =

American mathematician

- Born: January 30, 1943 (age 83); Bellefonte, Pennsylvania, U.S.
- Education: University of Utah
- Known for: Work in low-dimensional topology, geometric group theory
- Awards: Fellow of the American Mathematical Society; Sloan Fellowship
- Scientific career
- Fields: Mathematics
- Workplaces: University of Wisconsin-Madison; Brigham Young University
- Doctoral advisor: Cecil Burgess
- Doctoral students: Colin Adams

James W. Cannon (born January 30, 1943) is an American mathematician working in the areas of low-dimensional topology and geometric group theory. He was an Orson Pratt Professor of Mathematics at Brigham Young University.

== Biography ==
James W. Cannon was born on January 30, 1943, in Bellefonte, Pennsylvania. Cannon received a Ph.D. in mathematics from the University of Utah in 1969, under the direction of C. Edmund Burgess.

He was a professor at the University of Wisconsin, Madison from 1977 to 1985. In 1986 Cannon was appointed an Orson Pratt Professor of Mathematics at Brigham Young University. He held this position until his retirement in September 2012.

Cannon gave an American Mathematical Society (AMS) Invited address at the meeting of the AMS in Seattle in August 1977, an invited address at the International Congress of Mathematicians in Helsinki 1978, and delivered the 1982 Mathematical Association of America Hedrick Lectures in Toronto, Canada.

Cannon was elected to the American Mathematical Society Council in 2003 with the term of service February 1, 2004, to January 31, 2007. In 2012 he became a fellow of the American Mathematical Society.

In 1993 Cannon delivered the 30th annual Karl G. Maeser Distinguished Faculty Lecture at Brigham Young University.

Cannon is a member of the Church of Jesus Christ of Latter-day Saints.

== Mathematical contributions ==
=== Early work ===
Cannon's early work concerned topological aspects of embedded surfaces in R^{3} and understanding the difference between "tame" and "wild" surfaces.

His first famous result came in late 1970s when Cannon gave a complete solution to a long-standing "double suspension" problem posed by John Milnor. Cannon proved that the double suspension of a homology sphere is a topological sphere. R. D. Edwards had previously proven this in many cases.

The results of Cannon's paper were used by Cannon, Bryant and Lacher to prove (1979) an important case of the so-called characterization conjecture for topological manifolds. The conjecture says that a generalized n-manifold $M$, where $n \ge 5$, which satisfies the "disjoint disk property" is a topological manifold. Cannon, Bryant and Lacher established that the conjecture holds under the assumption that $M$ be a manifold except possibly at a set of dimension $(n-2)/2$. Later Frank Quinn completed the proof that the characterization conjecture holds if there is even a single manifold point. In general, the conjecture is false as was proved by John Bryant, Steven Ferry, Washington Mio and Shmuel Weinberger.

=== 1980s: Hyperbolic geometry, 3-manifolds and geometric group theory ===
In 1980s the focus of Cannon's work shifted to the study of 3-manifolds, hyperbolic geometry and Kleinian groups and he is considered one of the key figures in the birth of geometric group theory as a distinct subject in late 1980s and early 1990s. Cannon's 1984 paper "The combinatorial structure of cocompact discrete hyperbolic groups" was one of the forerunners in the development of the theory of word-hyperbolic groups, a notion that was introduced and developed three years later in a seminal 1987 monograph of Mikhail Gromov. Cannon's paper explored combinatorial and algorithmic aspects of the Cayley graphs of Kleinian groups and related them to the geometric features of the actions of these groups on the hyperbolic space. In particular, Cannon proved that convex-cocompact Kleinian groups admit finite presentations where the Dehn algorithm solves the word problem. The latter condition later turned out to give one of equivalent characterization of being word-hyperbolic and, moreover, Cannon's original proof essentially went through without change to show that the word problem in word-hyperbolic groups is solvable by Dehn's algorithm. Cannon's 1984 paper also introduced an important notion a cone type of an element of a finitely generated group (roughly, the set of all geodesic extensions of an element). Cannon proved that a convex-cocompact Kleinian group has only finitely many cone types (with respect to a fixed finite generating set of that group) and showed how to use this fact to conclude that the growth series of the group is a rational function. These arguments also turned out to generalize to the word-hyperbolic group context. Now standard proofs of the fact that the set of geodesic words in a word-hyperbolic group is a regular language also use finiteness of the number of cone types.

Cannon's work also introduced an important notion of almost convexity for Cayley graphs of finitely generated groups, a notion that led to substantial further study and generalizations.

An influential paper of Cannon and William Thurston "Group invariant Peano curves", that first circulated in a preprint form in the mid-1980s, introduced the notion of what is now called the Cannon–Thurston map. They considered the case of a closed hyperbolic 3-manifold M that fibers over the circle with the fiber being a closed hyperbolic surface S. In this case the universal cover of S, which is identified with the hyperbolic plane, admits an embedding into the universal cover of M, which is the hyperbolic 3-space. Cannon and Thurston proved that this embedding extends to a continuous π_{1}(S)-equivariant surjective map (now called the Cannon–Thurston map) from the ideal boundary of the hyperbolic plane (the circle) to the ideal boundary of the hyperbolic 3-space (the 2-sphere). Although the paper of Cannon and Thurston was finally published only in 2007, in the meantime it has generated considerable further research and a number of significant generalizations (both in the contexts of Kleinian groups and of word-hyperbolic groups), including the work of Mahan Mitra, Erica Klarreich, Brian Bowditch and others.

=== 1990s and 2000s: Automatic groups, discrete conformal geometry and Cannon's conjecture ===
Cannon was one of the co-authors of the 1992 book Word Processing in Groups which introduced, formalized and developed the theory of automatic groups. The theory of automatic groups brought new computational ideas from computer science to geometric group theory and played an important role in the development of the subject in 1990s.

A 1994 paper of Cannon gave a proof of the "combinatorial Riemann mapping theorem" that was motivated by the classic Riemann mapping theorem in complex analysis. The goal was to understand when an action of a group by homeomorphisms on a 2-sphere is (up to a topological conjugation) an action on the standard Riemann sphere by Möbius transformations. The "combinatorial Riemann mapping theorem" of Cannon gave a set of sufficient conditions when a sequence of finer and finer combinatorial subdivisions of a topological surface determine, in the appropriate sense and after passing to the limit, an actual conformal structure on that surface. This paper of Cannon led to an important conjecture, first explicitly formulated by Cannon and Swenson in 1998 (but also suggested in implicit form in Section 8 of Cannon's 1994 paper) and now known as Cannon's conjecture, regarding characterizing word-hyperbolic groups with the 2-sphere as the boundary. The conjecture (Conjecture 5.1 in) states that if the ideal boundary of a word-hyperbolic group G is homeomorphic to the 2-sphere, then G admits a properly discontinuous cocompact isometric action on the hyperbolic 3-space (so that G is essentially a 3-dimensional Kleinian group). In analytic terms Cannon's conjecture is equivalent to saying that if the ideal boundary of a word-hyperbolic group G is homeomorphic to the 2-sphere then this boundary, with the visual metric coming from the Cayley graph of G, is quasisymmetric to the standard 2-sphere.

The 1998 paper of Cannon and Swenson gave an initial approach to this conjecture by proving that the conjecture holds under an extra assumption that the family of standard "disks" in the boundary of the group satisfies a combinatorial "conformal" property. The main result of Cannon's 1994 paper played a key role in the proof. This approach to Cannon's conjecture and related problems was pushed further later in the joint work of Cannon, Floyd and Parry.

Cannon's conjecture motivated much of subsequent work by other mathematicians and to a substantial degree informed subsequent interaction between geometric group theory and the theory of analysis on metric spaces. Cannon's conjecture was motivated (see) by Thurston's Geometrization Conjecture and by trying to understand why in dimension three variable negative curvature can be promoted to constant negative curvature. Although the Geometrization conjecture was recently settled by Perelman, Cannon's conjecture remains wide open and is considered one of the key outstanding open problems in geometric group theory and geometric topology.

=== Applications to biology ===
The ideas of combinatorial conformal geometry that underlie Cannon's proof of the "combinatorial Riemann mapping theorem", were applied by Cannon, Floyd and Parry (2000) to the study of large-scale growth patterns of biological organisms. Cannon, Floyd and Parry produced a mathematical growth model which demonstrated that some systems determined by simple finite subdivision rules can results in objects (in their example, a tree trunk) whose large-scale form oscillates wildly over time even though the local subdivision laws remain the same. Cannon, Floyd and Parry also applied their model to the analysis of the growth patterns of rat tissue. They suggested that the "negatively curved" (or non-euclidean) nature of microscopic growth patterns of biological organisms is one of the key reasons why large-scale organisms do not look like crystals or polyhedral shapes but in fact in many cases resemble self-similar fractals. In particular they suggested (see section 3.4 of) that such "negatively curved" local structure is manifested in highly folded and highly connected nature of the brain and the lung tissue.

== Selected publications ==
- Cannon, James W. (1979), "Shrinking cell-like decompositions of manifolds. Codimension three.", Annals of Mathematics, Second Series, 110 (1): 83–112, doi:10.2307/1971245, JSTOR 1971245, MR 0541330
- Cannon, James W. (1984), "The combinatorial structure of cocompact discrete hyperbolic groups.", Geometriae Dedicata, 16 (2): 123–148, doi:10.1007/BF00146825, MR 0758901, S2CID 120759717
- Cannon, James W. (1987), "Almost convex groups.", Geometriae Dedicata, 22 (2): 197–210, doi:10.1007/BF00181266, MR 0877210, S2CID 121345025
- Epstein, David B. A.; Cannon, James W.; Holt, Derek F.; Levy, Silvio V.; Paterson, Michael S.; Thurston, William P. (1992), Word processing in groups., Boston, MA: Jones and Bartlett Publishers, ISBN 978-0-86720-244-1
- Cannon, James W. (1994), "The combinatorial Riemann mapping theorem.", Acta Mathematica, 173 (2): 155–234, doi:10.1007/BF02398434, MR 1301392
- Cannon, James W.; Thurston, William P. (2007), "Group invariant Peano curves.", Geometry & Topology, 11 (3): 1315–1355, doi:10.2140/gt.2007.11.1315, MR 2326947

== See also ==
- Geometric group theory
- Low-dimensional topology
- Word-hyperbolic group
- Geometrization conjecture
- Hyperbolic manifold
- Kleinian group
