= Brian Bowditch =

British mathematician

Brian Hayward Bowditch (born 1961) is a British mathematician known for his contributions to geometry and topology, particularly in the areas of geometric group theory and low-dimensional topology. He is also known for solving the angel problem. Bowditch holds a chaired Professor appointment in Mathematics at the University of Warwick.

== Biography ==
Brian Bowditch was born in 1961 in Neath, Wales. He obtained a B.A. degree from Cambridge University in 1983. He subsequently pursued doctoral studies in Mathematics at the University of Warwick under the supervision of David Epstein where he received a PhD in 1988. Bowditch then had postdoctoral and visiting positions at the Institute for Advanced Study in Princeton, New Jersey, the University of Warwick, Institut des Hautes Études Scientifiques at Bures-sur-Yvette, the University of Melbourne, and the University of Aberdeen. In 1992 he received an appointment at the University of Southampton where he stayed until 2007. In 2007 Bowditch moved to the University of Warwick, where he received a chaired Professor appointment in Mathematics.

Bowditch was awarded a Whitehead Prize by the London Mathematical Society in 1997 for his work in geometric group theory and geometric topology. He gave an Invited address at the 2004 European Congress of Mathematics in Stockholm. Bowditch is a former member of the Editorial Board for the journal Annales de la Faculté des Sciences de Toulouse and a former Editorial Adviser for the London Mathematical Society.

== Mathematical contributions ==
Early notable results of Bowditch include clarifying the classic notion of geometric finiteness for higher-dimensional Kleinian groups in constant and variable negative curvature. In a 1993 paper Bowditch proved that five standard characterisations of geometric finiteness for discrete groups of isometries of hyperbolic 3-space and hyperbolic plane, (including the definition in terms of having a finitely-sided fundamental polyhedron) remain equivalent for groups of isometries of hyperbolic n-space where n ≥ 4. He showed, however, that in dimensions n ≥ 4 the condition of having a finitely-sided Dirichlet domain is no longer equivalent to the standard notions of geometric finiteness. In a subsequent paper Bowditch considered a similar problem for discrete groups of isometries of Hadamard manifold of pinched (but not necessarily constant) negative curvature and of arbitrary dimension n ≥ 2. He proved that four out of five equivalent definitions of geometric finiteness considered in his previous paper remain equivalent in this general set-up, but the condition of having a finitely-sided fundamental polyhedron is no longer equivalent to them.

Much of Bowditch's work in the 1990s concerned studying boundaries at infinity of word-hyperbolic groups. He proved the cut-point conjecture which says that the boundary of a one-ended word-hyperbolic group does not have any global cut-points. Bowditch first proved this conjecture in the main cases of a one-ended hyperbolic group that does not split over a two-ended subgroup (that is, a subgroup containing infinite cyclic subgroup of finite index) and also for one-ended hyperbolic groups that are "strongly accessible". The general case of the conjecture was finished shortly thereafter by G. Ananda Swarup who characterised Bowditch's work as follows: "The most significant advances in this direction were carried out by Brian Bowditch in a brilliant series of papers ([4]-[7]). We draw heavily from his work". Soon after Swarup's paper Bowditch supplied an alternative proof of the cut-point conjecture in the general case. Bowditch's work relied on extracting various discrete tree-like structures from the action of a word-hyperbolic group on its boundary.

Bowditch also proved that (modulo a few exceptions) the boundary of a one-ended word-hyperbolic group G has local cut-points if and only if G admits an essential splitting, as an amalgamated free product or an HNN extension, over a virtually infinite cyclic group. This allowed Bowditch to produce a theory of JSJ decomposition for word-hyperbolic groups that was more canonical and more general (particularly because it covered groups with nontrivial torsion) than the original JSJ decomposition theory of Zlil Sela. One of the consequences of Bowditch's work is that for one-ended word-hyperbolic groups (with a few exceptions) having a nontrivial essential splitting over a virtually cyclic subgroup is a quasi-isometry invariant.

Bowditch also gave a topological characterisation of word-hyperbolic groups, thus solving a conjecture proposed by Mikhail Gromov. Namely, Bowditch proved that a group G is word-hyperbolic if and only if G admits an action by homeomorphisms on a perfect metrisable compactum M as a "uniform convergence group", that is such that the diagonal action of G on the set of distinct triples from M is properly discontinuous and co-compact; moreover, in that case M is G-equivariantly homeomorphic to the boundary ∂G of G. Later, building up on this work, Bowditch's PhD student Yaman gave a topological characterisation of relatively hyperbolic groups.

Much of Bowditch's work in 2000s concerns the study of the curve complex, with various applications to 3-manifolds, mapping class groups and Kleinian groups. The curve complex C(S) of a finite type surface S, introduced by Harvey in the late 1970s, has the set of free homotopy classes of essential simple closed curves on S as the set of vertices, where several distinct vertices span a simplex if the corresponding curves can be realised disjointly. The curve complex turned out to be a fundamental tool in the study of the geometry of the Teichmüller space, of mapping class groups and of Kleinian groups. In a 1999 paper Howard Masur and Yair Minsky proved that for a finite type orientable surface S the curve complex C(S) is Gromov-hyperbolic. This result was a key component in the subsequent proof of Thurston's Ending lamination conjecture, a solution which was based on the combined work of Yair Minsky, Howard Masur, Jeffrey Brock, and Richard Canary. In 2006 Bowditch gave another proof of hyperbolicity of the curve complex. Bowditch's proof is more combinatorial and rather different from the Masur-Minsky original argument. Bowditch's result also provides an estimate on the hyperbolicity constant of the curve complex which is logarithmic in complexity of the surface and also gives a description of geodesics in the curve complex in terms of the intersection numbers. A subsequent 2008 paper of Bowditch pushed these ideas further and obtained new quantitative finiteness results regarding the so-called "tight geodesics" in the curve complex, a notion introduced by Masur and Minsky to combat the fact that the curve complex is not locally finite. As an application, Bowditch proved that, with a few exceptions of surfaces of small complexity, the action of the mapping class group Mod(S) on C(S) is "acylindrical" and that the asymptotic translation lengths of pseudo-Anosov elements of Mod(S) on C(S) are rational numbers with bounded denominators.

A 2007 paper of Bowditch produces a positive solution of the angel problem of John Conway: Bowditch proved that a 4-angel has a winning strategy and can evade the devil in the "angel game". Independent solutions of the angel problem were produced at about the same time by András Máthé and Oddvar Kloster.

== Selected publications ==
- Bowditch, Brian H. (1995), "Geometrical finiteness with variable negative curvature", Duke Mathematical Journal, 77: 229–274, doi:10.1215/S0012-7094-95-07709-6, MR 1317633
- Bowditch, Brian H. (1998), "A topological characterisation of hyperbolic groups", Journal of the American Mathematical Society, 11 (3): 643–667, doi:10.1090/S0894-0347-98-00264-1, MR 1602069
- Bowditch, Brian H. (1998), "Cut points and canonical splittings of hyperbolic groups", Acta Mathematica, 180 (2): 145–186, doi:10.1007/BF02392898, MR 1638764
- Bowditch, Brian H. (2006), "Intersection numbers and the hyperbolicity of the curve complex", Crelle's Journal, 2006 (598): 105–129, doi:10.1515/CRELLE.2006.070, MR 2270568, S2CID 10831464
- Bowditch, Brian H. (2007), "The angel game in the plane", Combinatorics, Probability and Computing, 16 (3): 345–362, doi:10.1017/S0963548306008297, MR 2312431, S2CID 14682115
- Bowditch, Brian H. (2008), "Tight geodesics in the curve complex", Inventiones Mathematicae, 171 (2): 281–300, doi:10.1007/s00222-007-0081-y, MR 2367021, S2CID 18808639

== See also ==
- Geometric group theory
- Geometric topology
- 3-manifolds
- Kleinian groups
