= List of formulas in elementary geometry =

This is a short list of some common mathematical shapes and figures and the formulas that describe them.

== Two-dimensional shapes ==
Shape	Area	Perimeter/Circumference	Meanings of symbols
Square	$l^2$	$4l$	$l$ is the length of a side
Rectangle	$lb$	$2(l+b)$	$l$ is length, $b$ is breadth
Circle	$\pi r^2$	$2\pi r$ or $\pi d$	where $r$ is the radius and $d$ is the diameter
Ellipse	$\pi ab$		where $a$ is the semimajor axis and $b$ is the semiminor axis
Triangle	$\frac{bh}{2}$	$a+b+c$	$b$ is base; $h$ is height; $a,b,c$ are sides
Parallelogram	$bh$	$2(a+b)$	$b$ is base, $h$ is height, $a$ is side
Trapezoid	$\frac{a+b}{2}h$		$a$ and $b$ are the bases

== Three-dimensional shapes ==
Illustration of the shapes' equation terms

Cube

Cuboid

Prism

Parallelepiped

Pyramids

Tetrahedron

Cone

Cylinder

Sphere

Ellipsoid

This is a list of volume formulas of basic shapes:

- Cone – $\frac{1}{3}\pi r^2 h$, where $r$ is the base's radius and $h$ is the cone's height;
- Cube – $a^3$, where $a$ is the side's length;
- Cuboid – $abc$, where $a$, $b$, and $c$ are the sides' length;
- Cylinder – $\pi r^2 h$, where $r$ is the base's radius and $h$ is the cylinder's height;
- Ellipsoid – $\frac{4}{3}\pi abc$, where $a$, $b$, and $c$ are the semi-major and semi-minor axes' length;
- Sphere – $\frac{4}{3}\pi r^3$, where $r$ is the radius;
- Parallelepiped – $abc\sqrt{K}$, where $a$, $b$, and $c$ are the sides' length,$K = 1 + 2\cos(\alpha)\cos(\beta)\cos(\gamma) - \cos^2(\alpha) - \cos^2(\beta) - \cos^2(\gamma)$, and $\alpha$, $\beta$, and $\gamma$ are angles between the two sides;
- Prism – $Bh$, where $B$ is the base's area and $h$ is the prism's height;
- Pyramid – $\frac{1}{3}Bh$, where $B$ is the base's area and $h$ is the pyramid's height;
- Tetrahedron – ${\sqrt{2}\over12}a^3$, where $a$ is the side's length.

=== Sphere ===
The basic quantities describing a sphere (meaning a 2-sphere, a 2-dimensional surface inside 3-dimensional space) will be denoted by the following variables

- $r$ is the radius,
- $C = 2 \pi r$ is the circumference (the length of any one of its great circles),
- $S$ is the surface area,
- $V$ is the volume.

Surface area:

$$\begin{alignat}{4}
S
&= 4 \pi r^2 \\[0.3ex]
&= \frac{1}{\pi} C^2 \\[0.3ex]
&= \sqrt[3]{\pi (6 V)^2} \\[0.3ex]
\end{alignat}$$

Volume:

$$\begin{alignat}{4}
V
&= \frac{4}{3} \pi r^3 \\[0.3ex]
&= \frac{1}{6 \pi^2} C^3 \\[0.3ex]
&= \frac{1}{6 \sqrt{\pi}} S^{3/2} \\[0.3ex]
\end{alignat}$$

Radius:

$$\begin{alignat}{4}
r
&= \frac{1}{2 \pi} C \\[0.3ex]
&= \sqrt{\frac{1}{4 \pi} S} \\[0.3ex]
&= \sqrt[3]{\frac{3}{4 \pi} V} \\[0.3ex]
\end{alignat}$$

Circumference:

$$\begin{alignat}{4}
C
&= 2 \pi r \\[0.3ex]
&= \sqrt{\pi S} \\[0.3ex]
&= \sqrt[3]{\pi^2 6 V} \\[0.3ex]
\end{alignat}$$

== See also ==
- Arc length – Distance along a curve
- Area#Area formulas – Size of a two-dimensional surface
- Perimeter#Formulas – Path that surrounds an area
- List of second moments of area
- List of surface-area-to-volume ratios – Surface area per unit volume
- List of surface area formulas – Measure of a two-dimensional surface
- List of trigonometric identities
- List of volume formulas – Quantity of three-dimensional space
