= Relatively hyperbolic group =

In mathematics, relatively hyperbolic groups form an important class of groups of interest for geometric group theory. The main purpose in their study is to extend the theory of Gromov-hyperbolic groups to groups $G$ that may be regarded as hyperbolic assemblies of subgroups $H_i$, called peripheral subgroups, in a way that enables "hyperbolic reduction" of problems for $G$ to problems for the $H_i$s.

Illustrative examples of relatively hyperbolic groups are provided by the fundamental groups of complete noncompact hyperbolic manifolds of finite volume. Further generalizations such as acylindrical hyperbolicity are also explored by current research.

== Intuition and History ==
Just like Gromov-hyperbolic groups or spaces can be thought of as thickened free groups or trees, the idea of a group $G$ being hyperbolic relative to a collection of subgroups $H_i$ (called peripheral subgroups) is that $G$ looks like a "thickened tree-like patchwork" of the conjugates of the $H_i$s, so that it is "hyperbolic-away" from them.

From there, different approaches exist and find relevance in different contexts.

The original insight by Gromov, motivated by examples from Riemannian geometry and later elaborated by Bowditch, is to say that $G$ acts properly, but not cocompactly, on a Gromov-hyperbolic space in such a way that the conjugates of the $H_i$s fix points at infinity and that the action becomes cocompact after truncating horoballs around them. For this reason, the conjugates of the $H_i$s are called the parabolic subgroups.

Yaman later gave a fully dynamical characterization, no longer involving a hyperbolic space but only its boundary (called the Bowditch boundary).

The second kind of definition, first due to Farb, roughly says that after contracting the left-cosets of the $H_i$s to bounded sets, the Cayley graph of $G$ becomes a (non-proper) Gromov-hyperbolic space. The resulting notion, known today as weak hyperbolicity, turns out to require extra assumptions on the behavior of quasi-geodesics in order to match the Gromov-Bowditch one. Bowditch elaborated Farb's definition by only requiring $G$ to act on a hyperbolic graph with certain additional properties, including that the conjugates of the $H_i$s are the infinite vertex stabilizers.

Osin later characterized relative hyperbolicity in terms of relative linear isoperimetric inequalities. Druțu and Sapir gave a characterization in terms of asymptotic cones being tree-graded metric spaces, a relative version of real trees. This allows for a notion of relative hyperbolicity that makes sense for more general metric spaces than Cayley graphs, and which is invariant by quasi-isometry.

== Formal definition ==
Given a finitely generated group G with Cayley graph Γ(G) equipped with the path metric and a subgroup H of G, one can construct the coned off Cayley graph $\hat{\Gamma}(G,H)$ as follows: For each left coset gH, add a vertex v(gH) to the Cayley graph Γ(G) and for each element x of gH, add an edge e(x) of length 1/2 from x to the vertex v(gH). This results in a metric space that may not be proper (i.e. closed balls need not be compact).

The definition of a relatively hyperbolic group, as formulated by Bowditch goes as follows. A group G is said to be hyperbolic relative to a subgroup H if the coned off Cayley graph $\hat{\Gamma}(G,H)$ has the properties:

- It is δ-hyperbolic and
- it is fine: for each integer L, every edge belongs to only finitely many simple cycles of length L.

If only the first condition holds then the group G is said to be weakly relatively hyperbolic with respect to H.

The definition of the coned off Cayley graph can be generalized to the case of a collection of subgroups and yields the corresponding notion of relative hyperbolicity. A group G which contains no collection of subgroups with respect to which it is relatively hyperbolic is said to be a non relatively hyperbolic group.

== Properties ==
- If a group G is relatively hyperbolic with respect to a hyperbolic group H, then G itself is hyperbolic.
- If a group G is relatively hyperbolic with respect to a group H then it acts as a geometrically finite convergence group on a compact space, its Bowditch boundary
- If a group G is relatively hyperbolic with respect to a group H that has solvable word problem, then G has solvable word problem (Farb), and if H has solvable conjugacy problem, then G has solvable conjugacy problem (Bumagin)
- If a group G is torsion-free relatively hyperbolic with respect to a group H, and H has a finite classifying space, then so does G (Dahmani)
- If a group G is relatively hyperbolic with respect to a group H that satisfies the Farrell-Jones conjecture, then G satisfies the Farrell-jones conjecture (Bartels).
- More generally, in many cases (but not all, and not easily or systematically), a property satisfied by all hyperbolic groups and byH can be suspected to be satisfied by G
- The isomorphism problem for virtually torsion-free relatively hyperbolic groups when the peripheral subgroups are finitely generated nilpotent (Dahmani, Touikan)

== Examples ==
- Any hyperbolic group, such as a free group of finite rank or the fundamental group of a hyperbolic surface, is hyperbolic relative to the trivial subgroup.
- The fundamental group of a complete hyperbolic manifold of finite volume is hyperbolic relative to its cusp subgroup. A similar result holds for any complete finite volume Riemannian manifold with pinched negative sectional curvature.
- The free abelian group Z^{2} of rank 2 is weakly hyperbolic, but not hyperbolic, relative to the cyclic subgroup Z: even though the graph $\hat{\Gamma}(\mathbb{Z}^2,\mathbb{Z})$ is hyperbolic, it is not fine.
- The free product of a group H with any hyperbolic group, is relatively hyperbolic, relative to H
- Non-abelian limit groups appearing as limits of free groups are relatively hyperbolic, relative to some free abelian subgroups.
- Given a semi-direct product of a free group by an infinite cyclic group, it is relatively hyperbolic, relative to some canonical subgroups, if the action of the infinite cyclic group is expanding.
- Combination theorems and small cancellation techniques allow to construct new examples from previous ones.
- The mapping class group of an orientable finite type surface is either hyperbolic (when 3g+n<5, where g is the genus and n is the number of punctures) or is not relatively hyperbolic with respect to any subgroup.
- The automorphism group and the outer automorphism group of a free group of finite rank at least 3 are not relatively hyperbolic.
