= Elias Tukia =

Finnish politician

Elias Tukia (29 September 1877 – 30 April 1950) was a Finnish farmer and politician. He was born in Lappee. He was a Member of the Parliament of Finland, representing the Finnish Party from 1916 to 1918, the National Coalition Party from 1918 to 1919 and the Agrarian League from 1924 to 1948.
