= Mahan Mj =

Indian mathematician and monk of the Ramakrishna Order (born 1968)

Mahan Maharaj
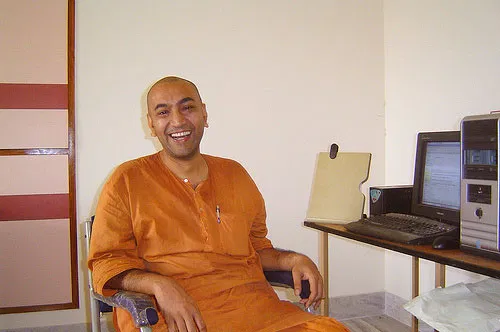
- Mahan Mitra
- Born: 5 April 1968 (age 58)
- Education: Indian Institute of Technology Kanpur; University of California, Berkeley
- Awards: Shanti Swarup Bhatnagar Award; Infosys Prize (2015)
- Scientific career
- Fields: Mathematics
- Workplaces: Ramakrishna Mission Vivekananda Educational and Research Institute; Tata Institute of Fundamental Research
- Thesis: Maps on boundaries of hyperbolic metric spaces (1997)
- Doctoral advisor: Andrew Casson

Mahan Maharaj (born Mahan Mitra (Bengali: মহান মিত্র), 5 April 1968), also known as Mahan Mj and Swami Vidyanathananda, is an Indian mathematician and monk of the Ramakrishna Order. He is currently Professor of Mathematics at the Tata Institute of Fundamental Research in Mumbai. He is a recipient of the 2025 Vigyan Shree Award 2011 Shanti Swarup Bhatnagar Award in mathematical sciences and the Infosys Prize 2015 for Mathematical Sciences. He is best known for his work in hyperbolic geometry, geometric group theory, low-dimensional topology and complex geometry.

== Early education ==
Mahan Mitra studied at St. Xavier's Collegiate School, Calcutta, till Class XII. He then entered the Indian Institute of Technology Kanpur, with an All India Rank (AIR) of 67 in the Joint Entrance Examination, where he initially chose to study electrical engineering but later switched to mathematics. He graduated with a Masters in mathematics from IIT Kanpur in 1992.

== Career ==
Mahan Mitra joined the PhD program in mathematics at the University of California, Berkeley, with Andrew Casson as his advisor. He received the Earle C. Anthony Fellowship, U.C. Berkeley in 1992–1993 and the prestigious Sloan Fellowship for 1996–1997. After earning a doctorate from U.C. Berkeley in 1997, he worked briefly at the Institute of Mathematical Sciences, Chennai in 1998.

He was Professor of Mathematics and Dean of Research at the Ramakrishna Mission Vivekananda University till 2015. He is currently Professor of Mathematics at the Tata Institute of Fundamental Research, Mumbai.

He has widely published and presented his research in the area of hyperbolic manifolds and ending lamination spaces. His most notable work is the proof of existence of Cannon–Thurston maps. This led to the resolution of the conjecture that connected limit sets of finitely generated Kleinian groups are locally connected. He is also the author of a book titled Maps on boundaries of hyperbolic metric spaces.

In 2017, he became a laureate of the Asian Scientist 100 by the Asian Scientist. Mj was an invited speaker at the International Congress of Mathematicians in 2018 in Rio de Janeiro.

== Personal life ==
Mj became a monk of the Ramakrishna order in 1998. Mahan Maharaj, as he is known to his students and colleagues, is fluent in English, Hindi and Bengali. He also knows a bit of Tamil, learnt from his stay in southern part of India at IMSc. He has been quoted as saying, "I am enjoying being a monk as much as I enjoy my mathematics".
