= Cocompact group action =

In mathematics, an action of a group G on a topological space X is cocompact if the quotient space X/G is a compact space. If X is locally compact, then an equivalent condition is that there is a compact subset K of X such that the image of K under the action of G covers X. It is sometimes referred to as mpact, a tongue-in-cheek reference to dual notions where prefixing with "co-" twice would "cancel out".
