= Cut point =

Point of a connected topological space, without which it becomes disconnected

The "neck" of this eight-like figure is a cut-point.

In topology, a cut-point is a point of a connected space such that its removal causes the resulting space to be disconnected. If removal of a point doesn't result in disconnected spaces, this point is called a non-cut point.

For example, every point of a line is a cut-point, while no point of a circle is a cut-point.

Cut-points are useful to determine whether two connected spaces are homeomorphic by counting the number of cut-points in each space. If two spaces have different number of cut-points, they are not homeomorphic. A classic example is using cut-points to show that lines and circles are not homeomorphic.

Cut-points are also useful in the characterization of topological continua, a class of spaces which combine the properties of compactness and connectedness and include many familiar spaces such as the unit interval, the circle, and the torus.

== Definition ==
=== Formal definitions ===
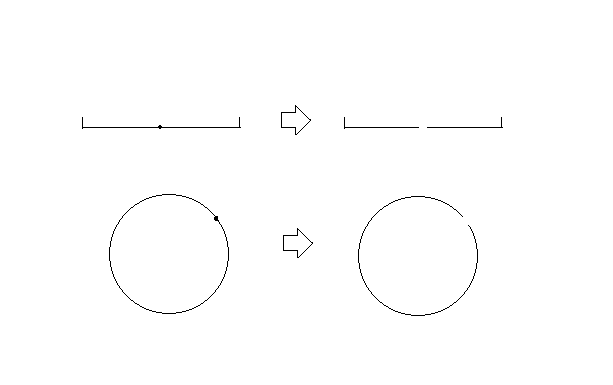
A line (closed interval) has infinitely many cut points between the two endpoints. A circle has no cut point. Since they have different numbers of cut points, lines are not homeomorphic to circles.

A point $p$ of a connected topological space $X$ is called a cut point of $X$ if $X\setminus\{p\}$ is not connected. A point $p$ of a connected space $X$ is called a non-cut point of $X$ if $X\setminus\{p\}$ is connected.

Note that these two notions only make sense if the space $X$ is connected to start with. Also, for a space to have a cut point, the space must have at least three points, because removing a point from a space with one or two elements always leaves a connected space.

A non-empty connected topological space X is called a cut-point space if every point in X is a cut point of X.

=== Basic examples ===
- A closed interval [a,b] has infinitely many cut points. All points except for its endpoints are cut points and the endpoints {a,b} are non-cut points.
- An open interval (a,b) has infinitely many cut points, like closed intervals. Since open intervals don't have endpoints, it has no non-cut point.
- A circle has no cut point. Every point of a circle is a non-cut point.

=== Notations ===
- A cutting of X is a set $\{p, U, V\}$ where $p$ is a cut-point of $X$, $U$ and $V$ form a separation of $X-\{p\}.$
- Also can be written as $X \setminus \{p\}=U|V.$

== Theorems ==
=== Cut-points and homeomorphisms ===
- Cut-points are not necessarily preserved under continuous functions. For example: f: [0, 2π] → R^{2}, given by f(x) = (cos x, sin x). Every point of the interval (except the two endpoints) is a cut-point, but f(x) forms a circle which has no cut-points.
- Cut-points are preserved under homeomorphisms. Therefore, cut-points are a topological invariant.

=== Cut-points and continua ===
- Every continuum (compact connected Hausdorff space) with more than one point has at least two non-cut points. Specifically, each open set which forms a separation of resulting space contains at least one non-cut point.
- Every continuum with exactly two noncut-points is homeomorphic to the unit interval.
- If K is a continuum with points a,b and K-{a,b} isn't connected, K is homeomorphic to the unit circle.

=== Topological properties of cut-point spaces ===
- Let X be a connected space and x be a cut point in X such that X\{x}=A|B. Then {x} is either open or closed. if {x} is open, A and B are closed. If {x} is closed, A and B are open.
- Let X be a cut-point space. The set of closed points of X is infinite.

== The Khalimsky line ==
The Khalimsky line is the set $\mathbb Z$ of integers with a base for the topology given by $\{ \{2i-1,2i,2i+1\} : i \in \mathbb{Z} \} \cup \{ \{2i+1\} : i \in \mathbb{Z}\}$. The topology is an Alexandrov topology. Every odd number is an isolated point. And the smallest neighborhood of an even number is the point itself together with the two adjacent elements.

The Khalimsky line is a cut-point space since every point is a cut point, but no proper subspace of it is a cut-point space. It is the only space with that property: A cut-point space for which no proper subspace is a cut-point space must be homeomorphic to the Khalimsky line.

== See also ==
- Cut vertex (graph theory)
