= Denis Osin =

Denis Osin is a mathematician at Vanderbilt University working in geometric group theory and geometric topology.

== Career ==
Osin received a PhD at Moscow State University in 1999 under the supervision of Aleksandr Olshansky. He worked at the Financial University under the Government of the Russian Federation, at the City College of CUNY, and joined Vanderbilt in 2008. He was promoted to a Full Professor in 2013. He is an editor at Groups, Geometry, and Dynamics.

== Recognition ==
He was a speaker at the International Congress of Mathematicians in Rio de Janeiro in 2018.

He was named to the 2021 class of fellows of the American Mathematical Society "for contributions in geometric group theory, specifically groups acting on hyperbolic spaces".
