= Pekka Tukia =

Finnish mathematician

Pekka Pertti Tukia (born 3 November 1945 in Pihtipudas) is a Finnish mathematician who does research on Kleinian groups and their geometric properties (such as limit sets).

Tukia received his PhD in 1972 with thesis advisor Kaarlo Virtanen in Helsinki. Tukia is a professor at the University of Helsinki.

He made substantial contributions to the collective work of about a dozen mathematicians who proved the Seifert fiber space conjecture. In 1992 he was an invited speaker with talk Generalizations of Fuchsian and Kleinian groups at the European Congress of European Mathematicians in Paris. In 1994 he was an invited speaker with talk A survey of Möbius groups at the International Congress of Mathematicians in Zürich.

== Selected publications ==
- Tukia, Pekka (1980). "On two dimensional quasiconformal groups". Annales Academiae Scientiarum Fennicea. Series A. 5: 73–78. CiteSeerX 10.1.1.732.909. doi:10.5186/aasfm.1980.0530.
- Tukia, Pakka (1981). "A quasiconformal group not isomorphic to the Möbius group". Annales Academiae Scientiarum Fennicae. Series A. 6: 149–160. doi:10.5186/aasfm.1981.0625.
- Tukia, Pekka (1984). "The Hausdorff dimension of the limit set of a geometrically finite Kleinian groups". Acta Mathematica. 152: 127–140. doi:10.1007/BF02392194.
- Tukia, Pekka (1985). "On limit sets of geometrically finite Kleinian groups". Mathematica Scandinavica. 57: 29–43. doi:10.7146/math.scand.a-12104.
- Tukia, Pekka (1985). "Differentiability and rigidity of Möbius groups". Inventiones Mathematicae. 82 (3): 557–578. Bibcode:1985InMat..82..557T. doi:10.1007/BF01388870. S2CID 123260399.
- Tukia, Pekka (1985). "Quasiconformal extension of quasisymmetric mappings compatible with a Möbius group". Acta Mathematica. 154 (3–4): 153–193. doi:10.1007/BF02392471.
- Tukia, Pekka (1985). "On isomorphisms of geometrically finite Möbius groups" (PDF). Publications Mathématiques de l'IHÉS. 61: 171–214. doi:10.1007/BF02698805.
- Tukia, Pekka (1986). "On quasiconformal groups". Journal d'Analyse Mathématique. 46: 318–346. doi:10.1007/BF02796595. S2CID 120093947.
- Tukia, P. (1989). "A rigidity theorem for Möbius groups". Inventiones Mathematicae. 97 (2): 405–431. Bibcode:1989InMat..97..405T. doi:10.1007/BF01389048. S2CID 121594611.
- Tukia, Pekka (1989). "Hausdorff dimension of quasisymmetric mappings". Mathematica Scandinavica. 65 (1): 152–160. doi:10.7146/math.scand.a-12274. JSTOR 24492095.
- Tukia, Pekka (1991). "Mostow-rigidity and non-compact hyperbolic manifolds". Quarterly Journal of Mathematics. 42 (1): 219–226. doi:10.1093/qmath/42.1.221.
- "Convergence groups and Gromov's metric hyperbolic spaces" (PDF). New Zealand Journal of Mathematics. 23: 157–187. 1994.
- Tukia, Pekka (2006). "Teichmüller sequences on trajectories invariant under a Kleinian group". Journal d'Analyse Mathématique. 99: 35–87. doi:10.1007/BF02789442. S2CID 121882279.
- Tukia, Pekka (2015). "Limits of Teichmüller maps". Journal d'Analyse Mathématique. 125: 71–111. doi:10.1007/s11854-015-0003-7. S2CID 255398787.
- with James W. Anderson and Kurt Falk: Anderson, James W.; Falk, Kurt; Tukia, Pekka (2007). "Conformal measures associated to ends of hyperbolic n-manifolds". Quarterly Journal of Mathematics. 58: 1–15. arXiv:math/0409582. doi:10.1093/qmath/hal019.
