= Thurston's 24 questions =

24 mathematical problems stated in 1982

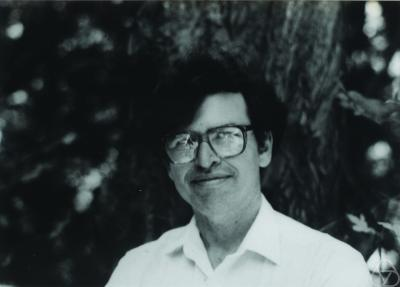
American mathematician William Thurston

Thurston's 24 questions are a set of mathematical problems in differential geometry posed by American mathematician William Thurston in his 1982 paper Three-dimensional manifolds, Kleinian groups and hyperbolic geometry published in the Bulletin of the American Mathematical Society.

== History ==
The questions appeared following Thurston's announcement of the geometrization conjecture, which proposed that all compact 3-manifolds could be decomposed into geometric pieces. This conjecture, later proven by Grigori Perelman in 2003, represented a complete classification of 3-manifolds and included the Poincaré conjecture as a special case.

By 2012, 22 of Thurston's 24 questions had been resolved.

== Table of problems ==
Thurston's 24 questions are:

| Problem | Brief description | Status | Year solved |
|---|---|---|---|
| 1st | Thurston's geometrization conjecture: every 3-manifold can be decomposed into prime manifolds of eight canonical geometries. | Solved by Grigori Perelman using Ricci flow with surgery. | 2003 |
| 2nd | Is every finite group action on 3-manifold equivalent to isometric action? | Solved by Meeks, Scott, Dinkelbach, and Leeb. | 2009 |
| 3rd | The geometrization conjecture for 3-dimensional orbifolds: if such orbifold have no with no 2-dimesional suborbifolds, can it be geometrically decomposed? | Solved by Boileau, Leeb, and Porti. | 2005 |
| 4th | Global theory of hyperbolic Dehn surgery: give upper bound for nonhyperbolic surgeries and find description of geometry that is created when hyperbolic surgery breaks down. | Resolved through work of Agol, Lackenby, and others. | 2000–2013 |
| 5th | Are all Kleinian groups geometrically tame? | Solved through work of Bonahon and Canary. | 1986–1993 |
| 6th | Can every Kleinian group be obtained as a limit of geometrically finite groups? | Solved by Namazi-Souto and Ohshika | 2012 |
| 7th | Develop theory of Schottky groups and their limits, that will be analogous to quasi-Fuchsian groups theory. | Resolved through work of Brock, Canary, and Minsky. | 2012 |
| 8th | Analysis of limits of quasi-Fuchsian groups with accidental parabolics. | Solved by Anderson and Canary. | 2000 |
| 9th | Are all Kleinian groups topologically tame? | Solved independently by Agol and by Calegari-Gabai. | 2004 |
| 10th | The Ahlfors measure zero problem: group obtained as a limit set of finitely-generated Kleinian group have either full measure or measure 0. In case of full measure, does it act ergodically? | Solved as consequence of geometric tameness. | 2004 |
| 11th | Ending lamination conjecture: can geometrically tame representations of given group be parametrized by their ending laminations and their parabolics? | Solved by Brock, Canary, and Minsky. | 2012 |
| 12th | Describe quasi-isometry type of Kleinian groups | Solved with ending lamination theorem. | 2012 |
| 13th | Is the limit set of Kleinian groups with Hausdorff dimension less than 2 geometrically finite? | Solved by Bishop and Jones. | 1997 |
| 14th | Existence of Cannon–Thurston maps for hyperbolic spaces. | Solved by Mahan Mj. | 2009–2012 |
| 15th | Is it possible to residually separate finitely-generated subgroups in a finitely-generated Kleinian group? | Solved by Ian Agol, building on work of Wise. | 2013 |
| 16th | Virtually Haken conjecture: does every aspherical or hyperbolic 3-manifold have a finite Haken cover? | Solved by Ian Agol. | 2012 |
| 17th | Having 3-manifold that is aspherical, does it have finite cover with positive first Betti number? | Solved by Ian Agol. | 2013 |
| 18th | Virtually fibered conjecture: every hyperbolic 3-manifold have a finite cover which is a surface bundle over the circle. | Solved by Ian Agol. | 2013 |
| 19th | Describe topology and geometry of manifolds constructed as quotient spaces of PSL(2,C) by arithmetic subgroups. | Unresolved. | — |
| 20th | Develop software for calculation of canonical form of surface diffeomorphisms and group action of diffeomorphisms of projectivized lamination spaces. | Addressed through development of SnapPea and other software. | 1990s–2000s |
| 21st | Develop software to compute hyperbolic structures on 3-manifold. | Addressed through development of SnapPea and other software. | 1990s–2000s |
| 22nd | Develop software for tabulation of basics informations about 3-manifolds, ie: their volumes, Chern-Simon invariants or knots. | Addressed through development of SnapPea and other software. | 1990s–2000s |
| 23rd | Are hyperbolic volumes of 3-manifold rationally independent? | Unresolved. | — |
| 24th | Existence of hyperbolic structures on 3-manifolds with given Heegaard genus. | Solved by Namazi and Souto. | 2009 |

== See also ==
- Geometrization conjecture
- Hilbert's problems
- Taniyama's problems
- List of unsolved problems in mathematics
- Poincaré conjecture
- Smale's problems
