= Albert Marden =

American mathematician

- Born: 18 November 1934 (age 92); Milwaukee, United States
- Education: Harvard University
- Scientific career
- Fields: Mathematics
- Workplaces: University of Minnesota
- Doctoral advisor: Lars Ahlfors

Albert Marden (born 18 November 1934) is an American mathematician, specializing in complex analysis and hyperbolic geometry. He is a son of another prominent mathematician, Morris Marden.

== Education and career ==
Marden received his PhD in 1962 from Harvard University with thesis advisor Lars Ahlfors. Marden has been a professor at the University of Minnesota since the 1970s, where he is now professor emeritus. He was a member of the Institute for Advanced Study (IAS) in the academic year 1969–70, Fall 1978, and Fall 1987.

His research deals with Riemann surfaces, quadratic differentials, Teichmüller spaces, hyperbolic geometry of surfaces and 3-manifolds, Fuchsian groups, Kleinian groups, complex dynamics, and low-dimensional geometric analysis.

Concerning properties of hyperbolic 3-manifolds, Marden formulated in 1974 the tameness conjecture, which was proved in 2004 by Ian Agol and independently by a collaborative effort of Danny Calegari and David Gabai.

In 1962, he gave a talk (as an approved speaker but not an invited speaker) on A sufficient condition for the bilinear relation on open Riemann surfaces at the International Congress of Mathematicians in Stockholm. In 2012 he was elected a Fellow of the American Mathematical Society. His doctoral students include Howard Masur.

== Selected publications ==
=== Articles ===
- Marden, Albert (1974). "The geometry of finite generated kleinian groups". Ann. of Math. 99 (3): 383–462. doi:10.2307/1971059. JSTOR 1971059.
- with David B. A. Epstein: "Convex hulls in hyperbolic space, a theorem of Sullivan, and measured pleated surfaces". In: Analytical and geometric aspects of hyperbolic space (Warwick and Durham, 1984). London Math. Soc. Lecture Note Series, 111. Cambridge: Cambridge Univ. Press. 1987. pp. 113–253. ISBN 9780521339063.
- with Troels Jørgensen: Jørgensen, T; Marden, A (1990). "Algebraic and geometric convergence of Kleinian groups". Mathematica Scandinavica. 66 (1): 47–72. doi:10.7146/math.scand.a-12292. JSTOR 24492023.
- with Burt Rodin: Marden, Al; Rodin, Burt (1990). "On Thurston's formulation and proof of Andreev's theorem". In: Computational methods and function theory. Lecture Notes in Mathematics. Vol. 1435. Springer. pp. 103–115. doi:10.1007/BFb0087901. ISBN 978-3-540-52768-8.
- with Daniel Gallo and Michael Kapovich: Gallo, Daniel; Kapovich, Michael; Marden, Albert (2000). "The monodromy groups of Schwarzian equations on closed Riemann surfaces" (PDF). Annals of Mathematics. 151 (2): 625–704. arXiv:math/9511213. doi:10.2307/121044. JSTOR 121044. S2CID 8077145.
- with D. B. A. Epstein and V. Markovic: Epstein, D. B. A; Marden, A; Markovic, V (2004). "Quasiconformal homeomorphisms and the convex hull boundary". Ann. of Math. 159 (2004), no. 1 (2): 305–336. doi:10.4007/annals.2004.159.305. JSTOR 3597252.

=== Books ===
- with Richard Canary and David B. A. Epstein (editors): Fundamentals of hyperbolic geometry: selected exposures. Cambridge University Press. 2006. ISBN 9780521615587.
- Outer Circles. An introduction to hyperbolic 3 manifolds. Cambridge University Press. 2007. ISBN 9781139463768.
- Hyperbolic manifolds: an introduction in 2 and 3 dimensions. Cambridge University Press. 2016. ISBN 9781316432525.
