= Gordon–Luecke theorem =

Two tame knots with homeomorphic complements are the same or mirror images

In mathematics, the Gordon–Luecke theorem on knot complements states that if the complements of two tame knots are homeomorphic, then the knots are equivalent. In particular, any homeomorphism between knot complements must take a meridian to a meridian.

The theorem is usually stated as "knots are determined by their complements"; however this is slightly ambiguous as it considers two knots to be equivalent if there is a self-homeomorphism taking one knot to the other. Thus mirror images are neglected. Often two knots are considered equivalent if they are isotopic. The correct version in this case is that if two knots have complements which are orientation-preserving homeomorphic, then they are isotopic.

These results follow from the following (also called the Gordon–Luecke theorem): no nontrivial Dehn surgery on a nontrivial knot in the 3-sphere can yield the 3-sphere.

The theorem was proved by Cameron Gordon and John Luecke. Essential ingredients of the proof are their joint work with Marc Culler and Peter Shalen on the cyclic surgery theorem, combinatorial techniques in the style of Litherland, thin position, and Scharlemann cycles.

For link complements, it is not in fact true that links are determined by their complements. For example, JHC Whitehead proved that there are infinitely many links whose complements are all homeomorphic to the complement of the Whitehead link. His construction is to twist along a disc spanning an unknotted component (as is the case for either component of the Whitehead link). Another method is to twist along an annulus spanning two components. Gordon proved that for the class of links where these two constructions are not possible there are finitely many links in this class with a given complement.
