= Simplicial volume =

Topological complexity in mathematics

In the mathematical field of geometric topology, the simplicial volume (also called Gromov norm) is a measure of the topological complexity of a manifold. More generally, the simplicial norm measures the complexity of homology classes.

Given a closed and oriented manifold, one defines the simplicial norm by minimizing the sum of the absolute values of the coefficients over all singular chains homologous to a given cycle. The simplicial volume is the simplicial norm of the fundamental class.

It is named after Mikhail Gromov, who introduced it in 1982. With William Thurston, he proved that the simplicial volume of a finite volume hyperbolic manifold is proportional to the hyperbolic volume.

The simplicial volume is equal to twice the Thurston norm.

Thurston also used the simplicial volume to prove that hyperbolic volume decreases under hyperbolic Dehn surgery.
