= The geometry and topology of three-manifolds =

The geometry and topology of three-manifolds is a set of widely circulated notes for a graduate course taught at Princeton University by William Thurston from 1978 to 1980 describing his work on 3-manifolds. They were written by Thurston, assisted by students William Floyd and Steven Kerchoff. The notes introduced several new ideas into geometric topology, including orbifolds, pleated manifolds, and train tracks.

== Distribution ==
Copies of the original 1980 notes were circulated by Princeton University. Later the Geometry Center at the University of Minnesota sold a loosely bound copy of the notes. In 2002, Sheila Newbery typed the notes in TeX and made a PDF file of the notes available, which can be downloaded from MSRI using the links below. The book (Thurston 1997) is an expanded version of the first three chapters of the notes. In 2022 the American Mathematical Society published a typeset version of the notes as part of the collected works of Thurston.

== Contents ==
Chapters 1 to 3 mostly describe basic background material on hyperbolic geometry.

Chapter 4 covers Dehn surgery on hyperbolic manifolds

Chapter 5 covers results related to Mostow's theorem on rigidity

Chapter 6 describes Gromov's invariant and his proof of Mostow's theorem.

Chapter 7 (by Milnor) describes the Lobachevsky function and its applications to computing volumes of hyperbolic 3-manifolds.

Chapter 8 on Kleinian groups introduces Thurston's work on train track and pleated manifolds

Chapter 9 covers convergence of Kleinian groups and hyperbolic manifolds.

Chapter 10 does not exist.

Chapter 11 covers deformations of Kleinian groups.

Chapter 12 does not exist.

Chapter 13 introduces orbifolds.
