= Clay Research Award =

Mathematics award

- Awarded for: Major breakthroughs in mathematical research
- Presented by: Clay Mathematics Institute
- First award: 1999
- Final award: 2026
- Website: www.claymath.org/research

The Clay Research Award is an annual award given by the Oxford-based Clay Mathematics Institute to mathematicians to recognize their achievements in mathematical research. The following mathematicians have received the award:

Year	Winner	Citation
2026	Robert Burklund, Jeremy Hahn, Ishan Levy and Tomer Schlank Yu Deng and Zaher Hani Tuomas Orponen, Pablo Shmerkin, Hong Wang and Joshua Zahl	”in recognition of their remarkable construction of counterexamples to Ravenel’s “Telescope Conjecture.” "in recognition of their remarkable derivation of the Boltzmann equation for long times, starting from a system of hard spheres." "in recognition of their remarkable work on geometric problems in harmonic analysis, leading to the proof of the Furstenberg set conjecture in the plane and the Kakeya conjecture in three dimensions."
2025	not awarded	
2024	Paul Nelson James Newton and Jack Thorne	"in recognition of his groundbreaking contributions to the analytic theory of automorphic forms. His work has resulted in the first convexity-breaking bounds for a large class of L-functions on the critical line (including all the standard ones of GL(n))." "for their remarkable proof of the existence of the symmetric power functorial lift for Hilbert modular forms."
2023	Frank Merle, Pierre Raphaël, Igor Rodnianski and Jérémie Szeftel	"for their groundbreaking advances in the understanding of singular solutions to the fundamental equations of fluids dynamics, including their construction of smooth self-similar solutions for the compressible Euler equation, and families of finite-energy blow-up solutions for both the compressible Euler and Navier-Stokes equations."
2022	Søren Galatius and Oscar Randal-Williams John Pardon	"for their profound contributions to the understanding of high dimensional manifolds and their diffeomorphism groups; they have transformed and reinvigorated the subject." "in recognition of his wide-ranging and transformative work in geometry and topology, particularly his groundbreaking achievements in symplectic topology."
2021	Bhargav Bhatt	"For his groundbreaking achievements in commutative algebra, arithmetic algebraic geometry, and topology in the p-adic setting."
2020	not awarded	
2019	Wei Zhang Tristan Buckmaster, Philip Isett and Vlad Vicol	"In recognition of his ground-breaking work in arithmetic geometry and arithmetic aspects of automorphic forms." "In recognition of the profound contributions that each of them has made to the analysis of partial differential equations, particularly the Navier-Stokes and Euler equations."
2018	not awarded	
2017	Aleksandr Logunov and Eugenia Malinnikova Jason Miller and Scott Sheffield Maryna Viazovska	"In recognition of their introduction of a novel geometric combinatorial method to study doubling properties of solutions to elliptic eigenvalue problems." "In recognition of their groundbreaking and conceptually novel work on the geometry of the Gaussian free field and its application to the solution of open problems in the theory of two-dimensional random structures." "In recognition of her groundbreaking work on sphere-packing problems in eight and twenty-four dimensions."
2016	Mark Gross and Bernd Siebert Geordie Williamson	"In recognition of their groundbreaking contributions to the understanding of mirror symmetry, in joint work generally known as the ‘Gross-Siebert Program’" "In recognition of his groundbreaking work in representation theory and related fields"
2015	Larry Guth and Nets Katz	"For their solution of the Erdős distance problem and for other joint and separate contributions to combinatorial incidence geometry"
2014	Maryam Mirzakhani Peter Scholze	"For her many and significant contributions to geometry and ergodic theory, in particular to the proof of an analogue of Ratner's theorem on unipotent flows for moduli of flat surfaces." "For his many and significant contributions to arithmetic algebraic geometry, particularly in the development and applications of the theory of perfectoid spaces"
2013	Rahul Pandharipande	"For his recent outstanding work in enumerative geometry, specifically for his proof in a large class of cases of the MNOP conjecture that he formulated with Maulik, Okounkov and Nekrasov"
2012	Jeremy Kahn and Vladimir Markovic	"For their work in hyperbolic geometry"
2011	Yves Benoist and Jean-François Quint Jonathan Pila	"For their spectacular work on stationary measures and orbit closures for actions of non-abelian groups on homogeneous spaces" "For his resolution of the André-Oort Conjecture in the case of products of modular curves"
2010	not awarded	
2009	Jean-Loup Waldspurger Ian Agol, Danny Calegari and David Gabai	"For his work in p-adic harmonic analysis, particularly his contributions to the transfer conjecture and the fundamental lemma" "For their solutions of the Marden Tameness Conjecture, and, by implication through the work of Thurston and Canary, of the Ahlfors Measure Conjecture"
2008	Clifford Taubes Claire Voisin	"For his proof of the Weinstein conjecture in dimension three" "For her disproof of the Kodaira conjecture"
2007	Alex Eskin Christopher Hacon and James McKernan Michael Harris and Richard Taylor	"For his work on rational billiards and geometric group theory, in particular, his crucial contribution to joint work with David Fisher and Kevin Whyte establishing the quasi-isometric rigidity of sol" "For their work in advancing our understanding of the birational geometry of algebraic varieties in dimension greater than three, in particular, for their inductive proof of the existence of flips" "For their work on local and global Galois representations, partly in collaboration with Clozel and Shepherd-Barron, culminating in the solution of the Sato-Tate conjecture for elliptic curves with non-integral j-invariants"
2006	not awarded	
2005	Manjul Bhargava Nils Dencker	"For his discovery of new composition laws for quadratic forms, and for his work on the average size of ideal class groups" "For his complete resolution of a conjecture made by F. Treves and L. Nirenberg in 1970"
2004	Ben Green Gérard Laumon and Ngô Bảo Châu	"For his joint work with Terry Tao on arithmetic progressions of prime numbers" "For their proof of the Fundamental Lemma for unitary groups"
2003	Richard S. Hamilton Terence Tao	"For his discovery of the Ricci Flow Equation and its development into one of the most powerful tools of geometric analysis" "For his ground-breaking work in analysis, notably his optimal restriction theorems in Fourier analysis, his work on the wave map equation, his global existence theorems for KdV type equations, as well as significant work in quite distant areas of mathematics"
2002	Oded Schramm Manindra Agrawal	"For his work in combining analytic power with geometric insight in the field of random walks, percolation, and probability theory in general, especially for formulating stochastic Loewner evolution" "For finding an algorithm that solves a modern version of a problem going back to the ancient Chinese and Greeks about how one can determine whether a number is prime in a time that increases polynomially with the size of the number"
2001	Edward Witten Stanislav Smirnov	"For a lifetime of achievement, especially for pointing the way to unify apparently disparate fields of mathematics and to discover their elegant simplicity through links with the physical world" "For establishing the existence of the scaling limit of two-dimensional percolation, and for verifying John Cardy's conjectured relation"
2000	Alain Connes Laurent Lafforgue	"For revolutionizing the field of operator algebras, for inventing modern non-commutative geometry, and for discovering that these ideas appear everywhere, including the foundations of theoretical physics" "For his work on the Langlands program"
1999	Andrew Wiles	"For his role in the development of number theory"

== See also ==
- List of mathematics awards
