= Erica Klarreich =

American mathematician

- Education: Stony Brook University
- Occupation: Journalist
- Employer: Quanta Magazine
- Website: https://ericaklarreich.pressfolios.com/

Erica Gail Klarreich is an American mathematician, journalist and science popularizer.

== Early life and education ==
Klarreich's father was a professor of mathematics, and her mother was a mathematics teacher.

Klarreich obtained her Ph.D. in mathematics under the guidance of Yair Nathan Minsky at Stony Brook University in 1997.

== Mathematics ==
As a mathematician, Klarreich proved that the boundary of the curve complex is homeomorphic to the space of ending laminations.

== Popular science writing ==
As a popular science writer, Klarreich's work has appeared in publications such as Nature, Scientific American, New Scientist, and Quanta Magazine. She is one of the winners of the 2021 Joint Policy Board for Mathematics Communications Award for her popular science writing.

== Personal life ==
As of 2025, Klarreich lives in Berkeley, California.

== Selected publications ==
=== Mathematics ===
- "The boundary at infinity of the curve complex and the relative Teichmüller space"
- "Semiconjugacies between Kleinian group actions on the Riemann sphere"

=== Popular science ===
- "Biologists join the dots", Nature, v. 413, n. 6855, pp. 450–452, 2001.
- "Foams and honeycombs", American Scientist, v. 88, n. 2, pp. 152–161, 2000.
- "Quantum cryptography: Can you keep a secret?", Nature, v. 418, n. 6895, pp. 270–272, 2002.
- "Huygens's clocks revisited", American Scientist, v. 90, pp. 322–323, 2002.
