= Whitehead manifold =

Open 3-manifold that is contractible but not homeomorphic to R3

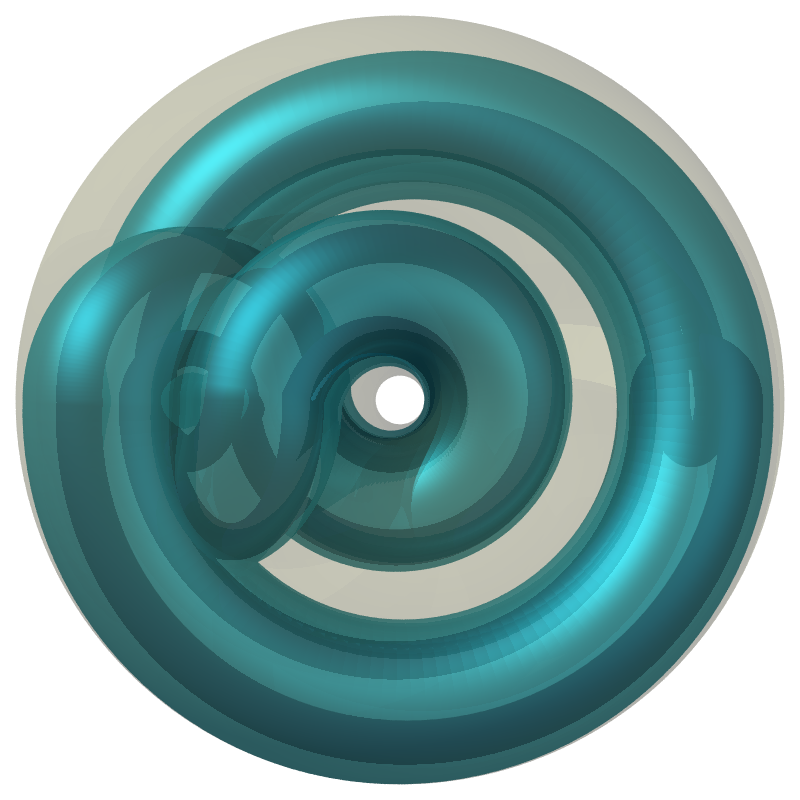
First three tori of Whitehead manifold construction

In mathematics, the Whitehead manifold is an open 3-manifold that is contractible, but not homeomorphic to $\R^3.$ It was discovered by J. H. C. Whitehead (1935) while trying to prove the Poincaré conjecture, correcting an error in an earlier paper Whitehead (1934, theorem 3) where he incorrectly claimed that no such manifold exists.

A contractible manifold is one that can continuously be shrunk to a point inside the manifold itself. For example, an open ball is a contractible manifold. All manifolds homeomorphic to the ball are contractible, too. One can ask whether all contractible manifolds are homeomorphic to a ball. For dimensions 1 and 2, the answer is classical and it is "yes". In dimension 2, it follows, for example, from the Riemann mapping theorem. Dimension 3 presents the first counterexample: the Whitehead manifold.

== Construction ==
Take a copy of $S^3,$ the three-dimensional sphere. Now find a compact unknotted solid torus $T_1$ inside the sphere. (A solid torus is the topological space $S^1\times D^2$. Intuitively, it is an ordinary three-dimensional doughnut, that is, a filled-in torus, which is topologically the product of a circle and a disk.) The closed complement of the unknotted solid torus inside $S^3$ is another solid torus.

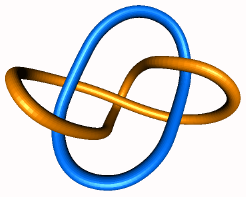
A thickened Whitehead link. In the Whitehead manifold construction, the blue (untwisted) torus is a tubular neighborhood of the meridian curve of $T_1$, and the orange torus is $T_2.$ Everything must be contained within $T_1.$

Now take a second unknotted solid torus $T_2$ inside $T_1$ so that $T_2$ and a tubular neighborhood of the meridian curve of $T_1$ is a thickened Whitehead link.

Note that $T_2$ is null-homotopic in the complement of the meridian of $T_1.$ This can be seen by considering $S^3$ as $\R^3 \cup \{\infty\}$ and the meridian curve as the z-axis together with $\infty.$ The torus $T_2$ has zero winding number around the z-axis. Thus the necessary null-homotopy follows. Since the Whitehead link is symmetric, that is, a homeomorphism of the 3-sphere switches components, it is also true that the meridian of $T_1$ is also null-homotopic in the complement of $T_2.$

Now embed $T_3$ inside $T_2$ in the same way as $T_2$ lies inside $T_1,$ and so on; to infinity. Define W, the Whitehead continuum, to be $W = T_\infty,$ or more precisely the intersection of all the $T_k$ for $k = 1,2,3,\dots.$

The Whitehead manifold is defined as $X = S^3 \setminus W,$ which is a non-compact manifold without boundary. It follows from our previous observation, the Hurewicz theorem, and Whitehead's theorem on homotopy equivalence, that X is contractible. In fact, a closer analysis involving a result of Morton Brown shows that $X \times \R \cong \R^4.$ However, X is not homeomorphic to $\R^3.$ The reason is that it is not simply connected at infinity.

The one point compactification of X is the space $S^3/W$ (with W crunched to a point). It is not a manifold. However, $\left(\R^3/W\right) \times \R$ is homeomorphic to $\R^4.$

David Gabai showed that X is the union of two copies of $\R^3$ whose intersection is also homeomorphic to $\R^3.$

== Related spaces ==
More examples of open, contractible 3-manifolds may be constructed by proceeding in similar fashion and picking different embeddings of $T_{i+1}$ in $T_i$ in the iterative process. Each embedding should be an unknotted solid torus in the 3-sphere. The essential properties are that the meridian of $T_i$ should be null-homotopic in the complement of $T_{i+1},$ and in addition the longitude of $T_{i+1}$ should not be null-homotopic in $T_i \setminus T_{i+1}.$

Another variation is to pick several subtori at each stage instead of just one. The cones over some of these continua appear as the complements of Casson handles in a 4-ball.

The dogbone space is not a manifold but its product with $\R^1$ is homeomorphic to $\R^4.$

== See also ==
- List of topologies
- Tame manifold
