= Aleksandr Logunov =

Aleksandr Logunov may refer to:

- Aleksandr Logunov (footballer) (born 1996), Russian football player
- Aleksandr Logunov (mathematician), Russian mathematician
