= Ahlfors measure conjecture =

Mathematical theorem

In mathematics, the Ahlfors conjecture, now a theorem, states that the limit set of a finitely generated Kleinian group is either the whole Riemann sphere, or has measure zero.

The conjecture was introduced by Lars Ahlfors, who proved it in the case that the Kleinian group has a fundamental domain with a finite number of sides. Richard Canary proved the Ahlfors conjecture for topologically tame groups, by showing that a topologically tame Kleinian group is geometrically tame, so the Ahlfors conjecture follows from Marden's tameness conjecture that hyperbolic 3-manifolds with finitely generated fundamental groups are topologically tame (homeomorphic to the interior of compact 3-manifolds). This latter conjecture was proved, independently, by Ian Agol and by Danny Calegari and David Gabai.

Canary also showed that in the case when the limit set is the whole sphere, the action of the Kleinian group on the limit set is ergodic.
