= Peter Shalen =

American mathematician

- Born: c. 1946 (age c. 80)
- Education: Harvard University (PhD)
- Known for: JSJ decomposition
- Scientific career
- Fields: Mathematics, Topology
- Workplaces: University of Illinois at Chicago
- Doctoral students: Nathan Dunfield

Peter B. Shalen (born c. 1946) is an American mathematician, working primarily in low-dimensional topology. He is the "S" in JSJ decomposition.

== Life ==
He graduated from Stuyvesant High School in 1962, before earning a BA from Harvard College in 1966 and his PhD from Harvard University in 1972. Following academic appointments at Columbia University, Rice University, and the Courant Institute of Mathematical Sciences, he joined the faculty of the University of Illinois at Chicago.

Shalen was a Sloan Foundation Research Fellow in mathematics (1977–1979). In 1986 he was an invited speaker at the International Congress of Mathematicians in Berkeley, California. He was elected as a member of the 2017 class of Fellows of the American Mathematical Society "for contributions to three-dimensional topology and for exposition".

== Work ==
His work with Marc Culler related properties of representation varieties of hyperbolic 3-manifold groups to decompositions of 3-manifolds. Based on this work, Culler, Cameron Gordon, John Luecke, and Shalen proved the cyclic surgery theorem. An important corollary of the theorem is that at most one nontrivial Dehn surgery (+1 or −1) on a knot can result in a simply-connected 3-manifold. This was an important piece of the Gordon–Luecke theorem that knots are determined by their complements. This paper is often referred to as "CGLS".

With John Morgan, he generalized his work with Culler, and reproved several foundational results of William Thurston.

== Selected publications ==
- Jaco, William H. & Shalen, Peter B. (1979). Seifert fibered spaces in 3-manifolds. Providence: American Mathematical Society. ISBN 0-8218-2220-9.
- Shalen, Peter B. Separating, incompressible surfaces in 3-manifolds. Inventiones Mathematicae 52 (1979), no. 2, 105–126.
- Culler, Marc; Shalen, Peter B. Varieties of group representations and splittings of 3-manifolds. Annals of Mathematics (2) 117 (1983), no. 1, 109–146.
- Culler, Marc; Gordon, C. McA.; Luecke, J.; Shalen, Peter B. Dehn surgery on knots. Annals of Mathematics (2) 125 (1987), no. 2, 237–300.
- Morgan, John W.; Shalen, Peter B. Valuations, trees, and degenerations of hyperbolic structures. I. Ann. of Math. (2) 120 (1984), no. 3, 401–476.
- Morgan, John W.; Shalen, Peter B. Degenerations of hyperbolic structures. II. Measured laminations in 3-manifolds. Annals of Mathematics (2) 127 (1988), no. 2, 403–456.
- Morgan, John W.; Shalen, Peter B. Degenerations of hyperbolic structures. III. Actions of 3-manifold groups on trees and Thurston's compactness theorem. Annals of Mathematics (2) 127 (1988), no. 3, 457–519.
