= William Floyd (disambiguation) =

William Floyd (1734–1821) was an American farmer and signer of the Declaration of Independence for New York.

William Floyd may also refer to:

- William Floyd (American football) (born 1972), American football player
- William Floyd, editor of The Arbitrator, a New York City Atheist Magazine, unsuccessfully sued Harry Rimmer on the grounds that he had discovered five scientific errors in the Bible
- William Floyd (mathematician)

See also

- William Floyd School District, New York
