= Tameness theorem =

In mathematics, the tameness theorem states that every complete hyperbolic 3-manifold with finitely generated fundamental group is topologically tame, in other words homeomorphic to the interior of a compact 3-manifold.

The tameness theorem was conjectured by Marden (1974). It was proved by Agol (2004) and, independently, by Danny Calegari and David Gabai. It is one of the fundamental properties of geometrically infinite hyperbolic 3-manifolds, together with the density theorem for Kleinian groups and the ending lamination theorem. It also implies the Ahlfors measure conjecture.

== History ==
Topological tameness may be viewed as a property of the ends of the manifold, namely, having a local product structure. An analogous statement is well known in two dimensions, that is, for surfaces. However, as the example of Alexander horned sphere shows, there are wild embeddings among 3-manifolds, so this property is not automatic.

The conjecture was raised in the form of a question by Albert Marden, who proved that any geometrically finite hyperbolic 3-manifold is topologically tame. The conjecture was also called the Marden conjecture or the tame ends conjecture.

There had been steady progress in understanding tameness before the conjecture was resolved. Partial results had been obtained by Thurston, Brock, Bromberg, Canary, Evans, Minsky, Ohshika. An important sufficient condition for tameness in terms of splittings of the fundamental group had been obtained by Bonahon.

The conjecture was proved in 2004 by Ian Agol, and independently, by Danny Calegari and David Gabai. Agol's proof relies on the use of manifolds of pinched negative curvature and on Canary's trick of "diskbusting" that allows to replace a compressible end with an incompressible end, for which the conjecture has already been proved. The Calegari–Gabai proof is centered on the existence of certain closed, non-positively curved surfaces that they call "shrinkwrapped".
