= Yair Minsky =

American mathematician and professor

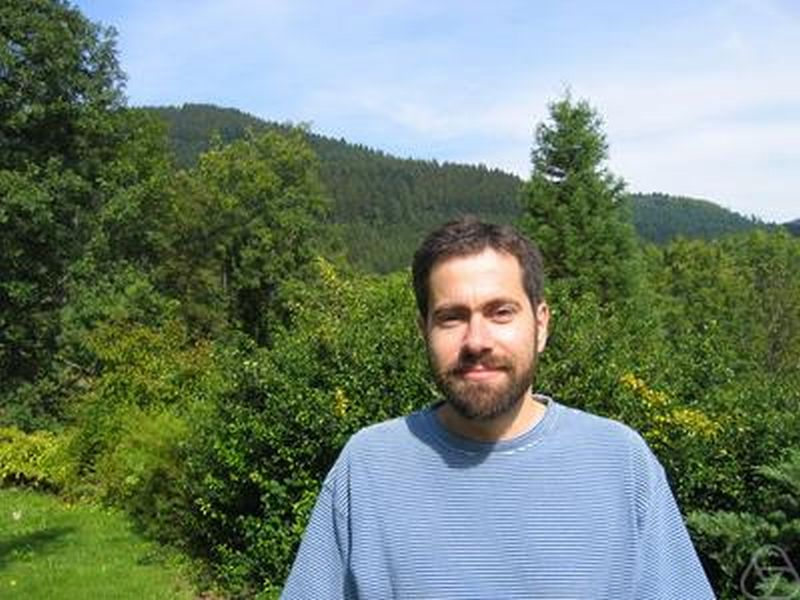
Yair Minsky, in Oberwolfach (2004)

Yair Nathan Minsky (born in 1962) is an Israeli-American mathematician whose research concerns three-dimensional topology, differential geometry, group theory and holomorphic dynamics. He is a professor at Yale University. He is known for having proved Thurston's ending lamination conjecture along with Jeffrey Brock and Richard Canary, and for results on the geometry of the curve complex obtained in collaboration with Howard Masur.

== Biography ==
Minsky obtained his Ph.D. from Princeton University in 1989 under the supervision of William Paul Thurston, with the thesis Harmonic Maps and Hyperbolic Geometry.

His Ph.D. students include Jason Behrstock, Erica Klarreich, Hossein Namazi and Kasra Rafi.

== Honors and awards ==
Minsky received a Sloan Fellowship in 1995 and was an invited speaker at the 2006 ICM in Madrid.

He was named to the 2021 class of fellows of the American Mathematical Society "for contributions to hyperbolic 3-manifolds, low-dimensional topology, geometric group theory and Teichmuller theory". He was elected to the American Academy of Arts and Sciences in 2023.

== Personal life ==
Minsky is the son of Naftaly Minsky, a professor of computer science at Rutgers University, and the brother of Yaron Minsky, the CTO of Jane Street Capital.

== Selected invited talks ==
- Coxeter lectures (Fields Institute) 2006
- Mallat Lectures (Technion) 2008

== Selected publications ==
- with Howard Masur: "Geometry of the complex of curves I: Hyperbolicity", Inventiones mathematicae, 138 (1), 103–149.
- with Howard Masur: "Geometry of the complex of curves II: Hierarchical structure", Geometric and Functional Analysis, 10 (4), 902–974.
- "The classification of Kleinian surface groups, I: Models and bounds", Annals of Mathematics, 171 (2010), 1–107.
- with Jeffrey Brock, and Richard Canary: "The classification of Kleinian surface groups, II: The ending lamination conjecture", Annals of Mathematics, 176 (2012), 1–149.
- with Jason Behrstock: "Dimension and rank for mapping class groups", Annals of Mathematics (2) 167 (2008), no. 3, 1055–1077.
- "The classification of punctured-torus groups", Annals of Mathematics, 149 (1999), 559–626.
- "On rigidity, limit sets, and end invariants of hyperbolic 3-manifolds", Journal of the American Mathematical Society, 7 (3), 539–588.

== See also ==
- Ending lamination theorem
- Curve complex

== Quotes ==
- "When Thurston proposed it, the virtual Haken conjecture seemed like a small question, but it hung on stubbornly, shining a spotlight on how little we knew about the field."
