= Jeffrey Weeks =

Jeffrey Weeks may refer to:

- Jeffrey Weeks (sociologist) (born 1945), historian and sociologist
- Jeffrey Weeks (mathematician) (born 1956), American mathematician
