= Algebraic topology (object) =

In mathematics, the algebraic topology on the set of group representations from G to a topological group H is the topology of pointwise convergence, i.e. p_{i} converges to p if the limit of p_{i}(g) = p(g) for every g in G.

This terminology is often used in the case of the algebraic topology on the set of discrete, faithful representations of a Kleinian group into PSL(2,C). Another topology, the geometric topology (also called the Chabauty topology), can be put on the set of images of the representations, and its closure can include extra Kleinian groups that are not images of points in the closure in the algebraic topology. This fundamental distinction is behind the phenomenon of hyperbolic Dehn surgery and plays an important role in the general theory of hyperbolic 3-manifolds.
