= Fanny Kassel =

French mathematician

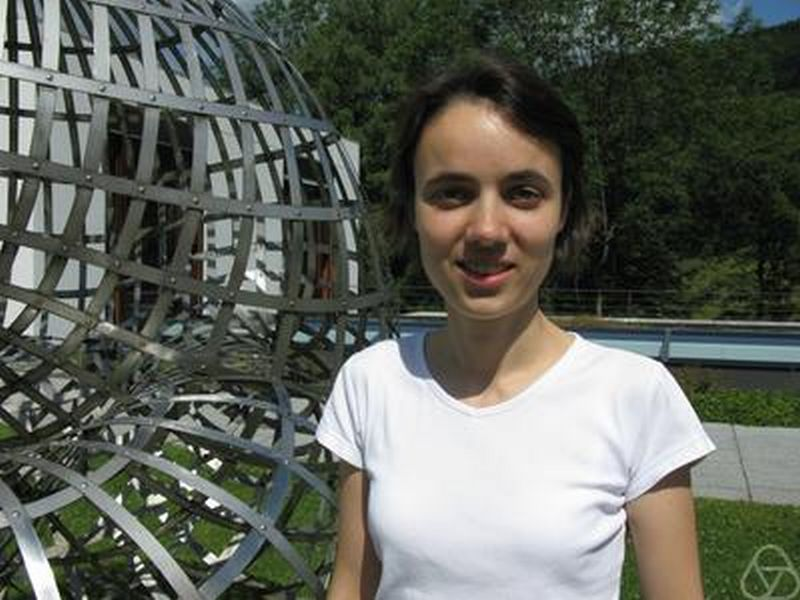
- Kassel at Oberwolfach, 2011.
- Born: 1983 (age 42–43)
- Education: Lycée Louis-le-Grand; École normale supérieure University of Paris-Sud (PhD)
- Awards: CNRS Bronze Medal (2015)
- Scientific career
- Fields: Mathematics
- Workplaces: Lille University of Science and Technology; Institut des Hautes Études Scientifiques
- Doctoral advisor: Yves Benoist

Fanny Kassel (born 1983) is a French mathematician, specializing in the theory of Lie groups.

== Education and career ==
Kassel entered the École normale supérieure in 2003 and received her PhD under the direction of Yves Benoist at the University of Paris-Sud in 2009. Her thesis was on "Compact quotients of real or p-adic homogeneous spaces". She then entered the CNRS and worked at the Paul-Painlevé Laboratory of the University of Lille I until 2016, when she joined the IHÉS as detached CNRS researcher.

== Honors and awards ==
In 2015, she was awarded the CNRS Bronze Medal and an ERC starting grant the following year. In 2018, she was an invited speaker at the International Congress of Mathematicians at Rio de Janeiro; her lecture was on "Geometric structures and representations of discrete groups". She was named MSRI Chern Professor for Fall 2020. In 2024, she was the recipient of the mathematics medal of the French Academy of Sciences.
