= Laura Person =

American mathematician

Laura J. Person is an American mathematician specializing in low-dimensional topology. She is a distinguished teaching professor of mathematics at the State University of New York at Potsdam.

== Education and career ==
Person completed her Ph.D. in mathematics at the University of California, Santa Barbara in 1988. Her dissertation, A Piece-Wise Linear Proof That The Singular Norm Is The Thurston Norm, concerned the Thurston norm, an invariant of three-dimensional spaces; it was supervised by Martin Scharlemann. She joined the faculty at SUNY Potsdam in 1989. At Potsdam, she is also the academic coordinator for volleyball.

== Book ==
Person is the co-author of the textbook Write Your Own Proofs In Set Theory and Discrete Mathematics (Zinka Press, 2005). The book's other co-author, Amy Babich, is a Texas-based mathematician, local politician, novelist, and recumbent bicycle seller.

== Recognition ==
In 2008, Person won the Clarence F. Stephens Award for Distinguished College or University Teaching of the Seaway Section of the Mathematical Association of America. She was named as a distinguished teaching professor and a member of the SUNY Distinguished Academy in 2016.
