= Geometric topology (object) =

Topological Object

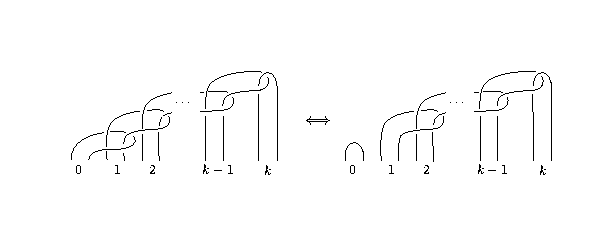

In mathematics, the geometric topology is a topology one can put on the set H of hyperbolic 3-manifolds of finite volume.

== Use ==
Convergence in this topology is a crucial ingredient of hyperbolic Dehn surgery, a fundamental tool in the theory of hyperbolic 3-manifolds.

== Definition ==
The following is a definition due to Troels Jorgensen:

A sequence $\{M_i\}$ in H converges to M in H if there are

- a sequence of positive real numbers $\epsilon_i$ converging to 0, and
- a sequence of $(1+\epsilon_i)$-bi-Lipschitz diffeomorphisms $\phi_i: M_{i, [\epsilon_i, \infty)} \rightarrow M_{[\epsilon_i, \infty)},$

where the domains and ranges of the maps are the $\epsilon_i$-thick parts of either the $M_i$'s or M.

== Alternate definition ==
There is an alternate definition due to Mikhail Gromov. Gromov's topology utilizes the Gromov-Hausdorff metric and is defined on pointed hyperbolic 3-manifolds. One essentially considers better and better bi-Lipschitz homeomorphisms on larger and larger balls. This results in the same notion of convergence as above as the thick part is always connected; thus, a large ball will eventually encompass all of the thick part.

=== On framed manifolds ===
As a further refinement, Gromov's metric can also be defined on framed hyperbolic 3-manifolds. This gives nothing new but this space can be explicitly identified with torsion-free Kleinian groups with the Chabauty topology.

== See also ==
- Algebraic topology (object)
