= Jean-François Quint =

French mathematician

Jean-François Quint is a French mathematician, specializing in dynamical systems theory for homogeneous spaces.

He studied at the École normale supérieure de Lyon and then received his Ph.D. from École Normale Supérieure (ENS) in Paris under Yves Benoist with Thèse de Doctorat: Sous-groupes discrets des groupes de Lie semi-simples réels et p-adiques.

In 2002 he joined the faculty of the Institut Camille Jordan as Chargé de recherche of the Centre national de la recherche scientifique (CNRS). In 2005 he joined the staff working on "Ergodic theory and dynamics systems" of Laboratoire Analyse, Géométrie et Applications (LAGA) at the Institut Galilée of the University of Paris 13. Since 2012 he has worked as CNRS Directeur de recherche at the University of Bordeaux.

In 2011, Yves Benoist and Jean-François Quint received the Clay Research Award for their collaborative research (and Jonathan Pila also received the 2011 Clay Research Award for unrelated research).

According to the citations, Benoist and Quint were honored "for their spectacular work on stationary measures and orbit closures for actions of nonabelian groups on homogeneous spaces. This work is a major breakthrough in homogeneous dynamics and related areas of mathematics. In particular, Benoist and Quint proved the following conjecture of Furstenberg: Let H be a Zariski dense semisimple subgroup of a Lie group which acts by left translations on the quotient of G by a discrete subgroup with finite covolume. Consider a probability m measure on H whose support generates H. Then any m-stationary probability measure for such an action is H-invariant."

== Selected publications ==
- Mesures de Patterson-Sullivan en rang supérieur. Geom. Funct. Anal. 12 (2002), no. 4, 776–809. doi:10.1007/s00039-002-8266-4
- with Benoist: Mesures stationnaires et fermés invariants des espaces homogènes, Parts 1,2, Comptes Rendus Mathématiques, vol. 347, 2009, pp. 9–13, vol. 349, 2011, pp. 341–345; and Annals of Mathematics, vol. 174, 2011, pp. 1111–1162 doi:10.4007/annals.2011.174.2.8
- with Benoist: Random walks on finite volume homogeneous spaces, Inventiones Mathematicae, vol. 187, 2012, pp. 37–59 doi:10.1007/s00222-011-0328-5
- with Benoist: Stationary measures and invariant subsets of homogeneous spaces (II). J. Amer. Math. Soc. 26 (2013), no. 3, 659–734. MR 3037785
- with Benoist: Stationary measures and invariant subsets of homogeneous spaces (III). Ann. of Math. (2) 178 (2013), no. 3, 1017–1059. MR 3092475
- with Benoist: Random Walks on Reductive Groups. Springer. 2016. ISBN 9783319477213.
