= Curve complex =

In mathematics, the curve complex is a simplicial complex C(S) associated to a finite-type surface S, which encodes the combinatorics of simple closed curves on S. The curve complex turned out to be a fundamental tool in the study of the geometry of the Teichmüller space, of mapping class groups and of Kleinian groups. It was introduced by W.J.Harvey in 1978.

== Curve complexes ==
=== Definition ===
Let $S$ be a finite type connected oriented surface. More specifically, let $S=S_{g,b,n}$ be a connected oriented surface of genus $g\ge 0$ with $b\ge 0$ boundary components and $n\ge 0$ punctures.

The curve complex $C(S)$ is the simplicial complex defined as follows:

- The vertices are the free homotopy classes of essential (neither homotopically trivial nor peripheral) simple closed curves on $S$;
- If $c_1, \ldots, c_n$ represent distinct vertices of $C(S)$, they span a simplex if and only if they can be homotoped to be pairwise disjoint.

=== Examples ===
For surfaces of small complexity (essentially the torus, punctured torus, and four-holed sphere), with the definition above the curve complex has infinitely many connected components. One can give an alternate and more useful definition by joining vertices if the corresponding curves have minimal intersection number. With this alternate definition, the resulting complex is isomorphic to the Farey graph.

== Geometry of the curve complex ==
=== Basic properties ===
If $S$ is a compact surface of genus $g$ with $b$ boundary components the dimension of $C(S)$ is equal to $\xi(S)-1 = 3g - 4 + b$. In what follows, we will assume that $\xi(S) \ge 2$. The complex of curves is never locally finite (i.e. every vertex has infinitely many neighbors). A result of Harer asserts that $C(S)$ is in fact homotopically equivalent to a wedge sum of spheres.

=== Intersection numbers and distance on C(S) ===
The combinatorial distance on the 1-skeleton of $C(S)$ is related to the intersection number between simple closed curves on a surface, which is the smallest number of intersections of two curves in the isotopy classes. For example

$$d_S (\alpha, \beta) \le 2 \log_2 (i(\alpha, \beta)) + 2$$

for any two nondisjoint simple closed curves $\alpha, \beta$. One can compare in the other direction but the results are much more subtle (for example there is no uniform lower bound even for a given surface) and harder to prove.

=== Hyperbolicity ===
It was proved by Masur and Minsky that the complex of curves is a Gromov hyperbolic space. Later work by various authors gave alternate proofs of this fact and better information on the hyperbolicity.

== Relation with the mapping class group and Teichmüller space ==
=== Action of the mapping class group ===
The mapping class group of $S$ acts on the complex $C(S)$ in the natural way: it acts on the vertices by $\phi\cdot\alpha = \phi_*\alpha$ and this extends to an action on the full complex. This action allows to prove many interesting properties of the mapping class groups.

While the mapping class group itself is not a hyperbolic group, the fact that $C(S)$ is hyperbolic still has implications for its structure and geometry.

=== Comparison with Teichmüller space ===
There is a natural map from Teichmüller space to the curve complex, which takes a marked hyperbolic structures to the collection of closed curves realising the smallest possible length (the systole). It allows to read off certain geometric properties of the latter, in particular it explains the empirical fact that while Teichmüller space itself is not hyperbolic it retains certain features of hyperbolicity.

== Applications to 3-dimensional topology ==
=== Heegaard splittings ===
A simplex in $C(S)$ determines a "filling" of $S$ to a handlebody. Choosing two simplices in $C(S)$ thus determines a Heegaard splitting of a three-manifold, with the additional data of an Heegaard diagram (a maximal system of disjoint simple closed curves bounding disks for each of the two handlebodies). Some properties of Heegaard splittings can be read very efficiently off the relative positions of the simplices:

- the splitting is reducible if and only if it has a diagram represented by simplices which have a common vertex;
- the splitting is weakly reducible if and only if it has a diagram represented by simplices which are linked by an edge.

In general the minimal distance between simplices representing diagram for the splitting can give information on the topology and geometry (in the sense of the geometrisation conjecture of the manifold) and vice versa. A guiding principle is that the minimal distance of a Heegaard splitting is a measure of the complexity of the manifold.

=== Kleinian groups ===
As a special case of the philosophy of the previous paragraph, the geometry of the curve complex is an important tool to link combinatorial and geometric properties of hyperbolic 3-manifolds, and hence it is a useful tool in the study of Kleinian groups. For example, it has been used in the proof of the ending lamination conjecture.

=== Random manifolds ===
A possible model for random 3-manifolds is to take random Heegaard splittings. The proof that this model is hyperbolic almost surely (in a certain sense) uses the geometry of the complex of curves.
