= Robert Riley (mathematician) =

American mathematician

Robert F. Riley (December 22, 1935–March 4, 2000) was an American mathematician. He is known for his work in low-dimensional topology using computational tools and hyperbolic geometry, being one of the inspirations for William Thurston's later breakthroughs in 3-dimensional topology.

== Career ==
Riley earned a bachelor's degree in mathematics from MIT in 1957; shortly thereafter he dropped out of the graduate program and went on to work in industry, eventually moving to Amsterdam in 1966. In 1968 he took a temporary position at the University of Southampton. He defended his Ph.D. at this institution in 1980, under the nominal direction of David Singerman. For the next two years he occupied a postdoctoral position in Boulder where William Thurston was employed at the time, before moving on to Binghamton University as a professor.

== Mathematical work ==
Riley's research was in geometric topology, especially in knot theory, where he mostly studied representations of knot groups. Early on, following work of Ralph Fox, he was interested in morphisms to finite groups. Later on in Southampton, considering $\mathrm{SL}_2(\mathbb C)$-representations sending peripheral elements to parabolics led him to discover the hyperbolic structure on the complement of the figure-eight knot and some others. This was one of the few examples of hyperbolic 3-manifolds that were available at the time, and as such it was one of the motivations which led to William Thurston's geometrisation conjecture, which includes as a particular case a criterion for a knot complement to support a hyperbolic structure. One notable feature of Riley's work is that it relied much on the assistance of a computer.

=== Selected publications ===
- | R75a. | Riley, Robert (1975a). "Discrete parabolic representations of link groups". Mathematika. 22 (2): 141–150. doi:10.1112/S0025579300005982. MR 0425946. |
- | R75b. | Riley, Robert (1975b). "A quadratic parabolic group". Mathematical Proceedings of the Cambridge Philosophical Society. 77 (2): 281–288. Bibcode:1975MPCPS..77..281R. doi:10.1017/S0305004100051094. MR 0412416. |
- | R13. | Riley, Robert (2013). "A personal account of the discovery of hyperbolic structures on some knot complements". Expositiones Mathematicae. 31 (2): 104–115. arXiv:1301.4601. doi:10.1016/j.exmath.2013.01.003. MR 3057120. S2CID 119319528. |
