= Howard Masur =

American mathematician

Howard Alan Masur
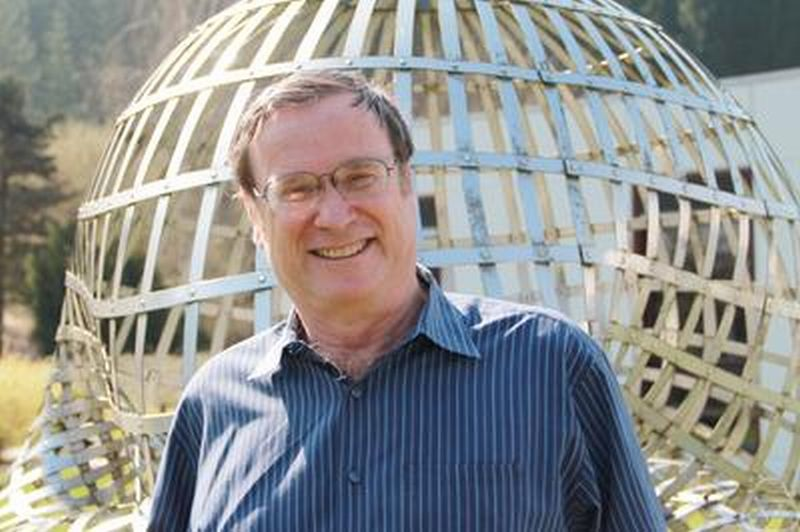
- Howard Masur in Oberwolfach, 2014
- Citizenship: American
- Education: University of Minnesota
- Awards: Fellow of Amer. Math. Soc.
- Scientific career
- Fields: topology, geometry, and combinatorial group theory
- Thesis: The Curvature of Teichmuller Space (1974)
- Doctoral advisor: Albert Marden
- Doctoral students: Jing Tao

Howard Alan Masur is an American mathematician who works on topology, geometry, and combinatorial group theory.

== Biography ==
Masur was an invited speaker at the 1994 International Congress of Mathematicians in Zürich. and is a fellow of the American Mathematical Society.

Along with Yair Minsky, Masur is one of the pioneers of the study of curve complex geometry. He also contributed to the understanding of the convergence of geodesic rays in Teichmüller theory.

Masur was a Ph.D. student of Albert Marden at the University of Minnesota-Minneapolis.

== Awards and recognitions ==
The Hubbard–Masur theorem is named after Masur and John H. Hubbard. In 2009, a conference of mathematicians honored Masur's 60th birthday in France.

== Selected papers ==
- Howard Masur (1982). "Interval exchange transformations and measured foliations". Annals of Mathematics. 115 (1): 169–200. doi:10.2307/1971341. JSTOR 1971341.
- Howard Masur (1975). "On a class of geodesics in Teichmuller space". Annals of Mathematics. 102 (2): 205–221. doi:10.2307/1971031. JSTOR 1971031.
