= Simply connected at infinity =

Mathematical property

In topology, a branch of mathematics, a topological space X is said to be simply connected at infinity if for any compact subset C of X, there is a compact set D in X containing C so that the induced map on fundamental groups

$$\pi_1(X-D) \to \pi_1(X-C)$$

is the zero map. Intuitively, this is the property that loops far away from a small subspace of X can be collapsed, no matter how bad the small subspace is.

The Whitehead manifold is an example of a 3-manifold that is contractible but not simply connected at infinity. Since this property is invariant under homeomorphism, this proves that the Whitehead manifold is not homeomorphic to R^{3}.

However, it is a theorem of John R. Stallings that for $n \geq 5$, a contractible n-manifold is homeomorphic to R^{n} precisely when it is simply connected at infinity.
