= Jason Behrstock =

American mathematician

Jason Alan Behrstock
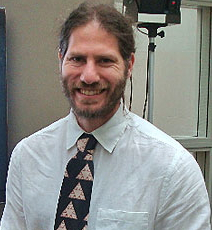
- Jason Behrstock in 2010
- Citizenship: United States
- Education: State University of New York at Stony Brook
- Known for: Geometric group theory
- Awards: Simons Fellow; Alfred P. Sloan Fellow; Fellow of the American Mathematical Society
- Scientific career
- Fields: Mathematics
- Workplaces: Lehman College; CUNY Graduate Center
- Thesis: Asymptotic Geometry of the Mapping Class Group and Teichmüller Space (2004)
- Doctoral advisor: Yair Minsky

Jason Alan Behrstock is a mathematician at the City University of New York known for his work in geometric group theory and low-dimensional topology.

== Life and career ==
Behrstock was born in California and was educated in California's public school system. He received his Ph.D. from State University of New York at Stony Brook in 2004. He went to work at Columbia University and the University of Utah before his time at Lehman College, City University of New York.

== Awards and honors ==
- In 2009, Behrstock was award the Feliks Gross Endowment Award by the Graduate Center of the City University of New York, a research award for young faculty.
- In 2010, Behrstock was awarded the Alfred P. Sloan Fellowship.
- In 2012, Behrstock became a fellow of the American Mathematical Society.
- Behrstock became a Simons Fellow in 2014.

== Selected publications ==
- Behrstock, Jason A. "Asymptotic geometry of the mapping class group and Teichmüller space". Geom. Topol. 10 (2006), pages 1523–1578.
- Behrstock, Jason; Druţu, Cornelia; Mosher, Lee. "Thick metric spaces, relative hyperbolicity, and quasi-isometric rigidity". Math. Ann. 344 (2009), number 3, pages 543–595.
- Behrstock, Jason A.; Minsky, Yair N. "Dimension and rank for mapping class groups". Ann. of Math. (2) 167 (2008), number 3, pages 1055–1077.
