= Jing Tao =

Mathematician

Jing Tao is a mathematician at the University of Oklahoma, where she holds an Anadarko Petroleum Corporation Presidential Professorship. Her research interests concern low-dimensional topology and geometric group theory, including mapping class groups and Teichmüller theory.

Tao was a student of Howard Masur at the University of Illinois Chicago, where she completed her Ph.D. in 2009. Her dissertation was Linearly bounded conjugator property for mapping class groups. She joined the University of Oklahoma mathematics department in 2012, and was given the Anadarko Petroleum Corporation Presidential Professorship in 2021. She was promoted to full professor in 2022.

Tao was elected as a Fellow of the American Mathematical Society, in the 2025 class of fellows.
