= John Edwin Luecke =

American mathematician

- Education: University of Texas at Austin
- Known for: Gordon–Luecke theorem
- Scientific career
- Fields: topology, knot theory
- Doctoral advisor: Cameron McAllan Gordon
- Doctoral students: Lisa Piccirillo

John Edwin Luecke is an American mathematician who works in topology and knot theory. He got his Ph.D. in 1985 from the University of Texas at Austin and is now a professor in the department of mathematics at that institution.

== Work ==
Luecke specializes in knot theory and 3-manifolds. In a 1987 paper Luecke, Marc Culler, Cameron Gordon, and Peter Shalen proved the cyclic surgery theorem. In a 1989 paper Luecke and Cameron Gordon proved that knots are determined by their complements, a result now known as the Gordon–Luecke theorem.

Dr Luecke received a NSF Presidential Young Investigator Award in 1992 and Sloan Foundation fellow in 1994. In 2012 he became a fellow of the American Mathematical Society.
