= Dogbone space =

Quotient space in geometric topology

The first stage of the dogbone space construction.

In geometric topology, the dogbone space, constructed by R. H. Bing, is a quotient space of three-dimensional Euclidean space $\R^3$ such that all inverse images of points are points or tame arcs, yet it is not homeomorphic to $\R^3$. The name "dogbone space" refers to a fanciful resemblance between some of the diagrams of genus 2 surfaces in Bing's paper and a dog bone. Bing showed that the product of the dogbone space with $\R^1$ is homeomorphic to $\R^4$.

Although the dogbone space is not a manifold, it is a generalized homological manifold and a homotopy manifold.

== See also ==
- List of topologies
- Whitehead manifold, a contractible 3-manifold not homeomorphic to $\R^3$.

== Sources ==
- Daverman, Robert J. (1986), Decompositions of manifolds, Geom. Topol. Monogr., vol. 9, pp. 7–15, doi:10.1090/chel/362, ISBN 978-0-8218-4372-7, MR 2341468
