= François Labourie =

French mathematician

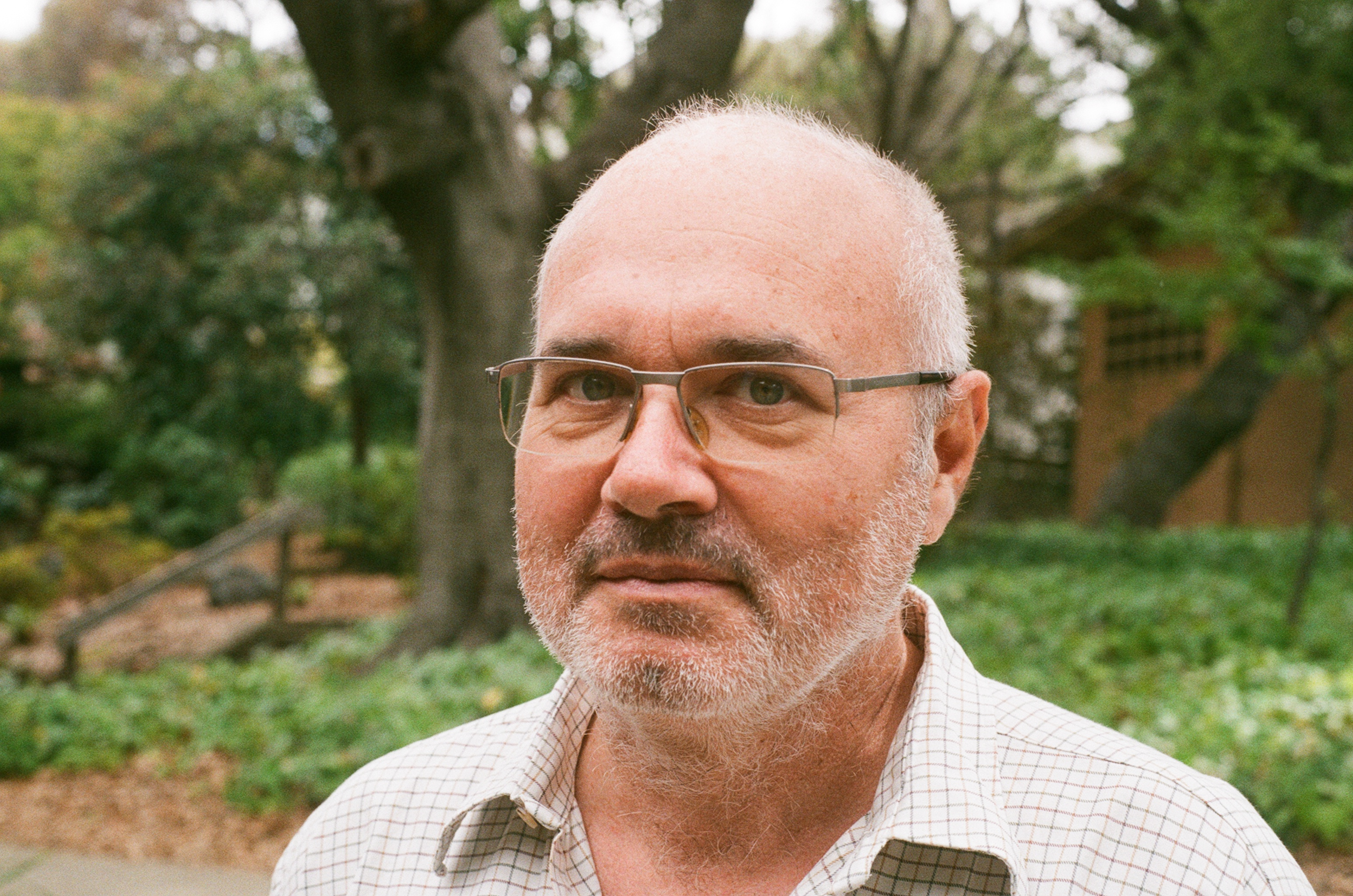
- Born: 15 December 1960 (age 65); Rouen, Upper Normandy, France
- Education: Paris Diderot University
- Awards: Grand Prix scientifique de la Fondation Louis D. (2016); Carrière Prize (1993); EMS Prize (1992)
- Scientific career
- Fields: Mathematics
- Workplaces: Paris-Sud 11 University
- Thesis: Géométrie et topologie des surfaces localement convexes: limite d'immersions isométriques (1987)
- Doctoral advisor: Mikhail Gromov; Marcel Berger

François Labourie (born 15 December 1960) is a French mathematician who has made various contributions to geometry, including pseudoholomorphic curves, Anosov diffeomorphisms, and convex geometry. In a series of papers with Yves Benoist and Patrick Foulon, he solved a conjecture on Anosov flows in compact contact manifolds.

He was educated at the École Normale Supérieure and Paris Diderot University, where he earned his Ph.D. in 1987 under supervision of Mikhail Gromov and Marcel Berger. In 1992 he was awarded one of the inaugural prizes of the European Mathematical Society. In 1998 he was an Invited Speaker of the International Congress of Mathematicians in Berlin.
