= Thurston norm =

In mathematics, the Thurston norm is a function on the second homology group of an oriented 3-manifold introduced by William Thurston, which measures in a natural way the topological complexity of homology classes represented by surfaces.

== Definition ==
Let $M$ be a differentiable manifold and $c \in H_2(M)$. Then $c$ can be represented by a smooth embedding $S \to M$, where $S$ is a (not necessarily connected) surface that is compact and without boundary. The Thurston norm of $c$ is then defined to be

$$\|c\|_T = \min_{S} \sum_{i=1}^n \chi_-(S_i)$$,

where the minimum is taken over all embedded surfaces $S = \bigcup_i S_i$ (the $S_i$ being the connected components) representing $c$ as above, and $\chi_-(F) = \max(0, -\chi(F))$ is the absolute value of the Euler characteristic for surfaces which are not spheres (and 0 for spheres).

This function satisfies the following properties:

- $\| kc \|_T = |k| \cdot \| c \|_T$ for $c \in H_2(M), k \in \Z$;
- $\| c_1 + c_2 \|_T \le \| c_1 \|_T + \| c_2 \|_T$ for $c_1, c_2 \in H_2(M)$.

These properties imply that $\| \cdot \|$ extends to a function on $H_2(M, \Q)$ which can then be extended by continuity to a seminorm $\| \cdot \|_T$ on $H_2(M,\R)$. By Poincaré duality, one can define the Thurston norm on $H^1(M, \R)$.

When $M$ is compact with boundary, the Thurston norm is defined in a similar manner on the relative homology group $H_2(M, \partial M, \R)$ and its Poincaré dual $H^1(M,\R)$.

It follows from further work of David Gabai that one can also define the Thurston norm using only immersed surfaces. This implies that the Thurston norm is also equal to half the Gromov norm on homology.

== Topological applications ==
The Thurston norm was introduced in view of its applications to fiberings and foliations of 3-manifolds.

The unit ball $B$ of the Thurston norm of a 3-manifold $M$ is a polytope with integer vertices. It can be used to describe the structure of the set of fiberings of $M$ over the circle: if $M$ can be written as the mapping torus of a diffeomorphism $f$ of a surface $S$ then the embedding $S \hookrightarrow M$ represents a class in a top-dimensional (or open) face of $B$: moreover all other integer points on the same face are also fibers in such a fibration.

Embedded surfaces which minimise the Thurston norm in their homology class are exactly the closed leaves of foliations of $M$.
