= Eugenia Malinnikova =

Russian mathematician

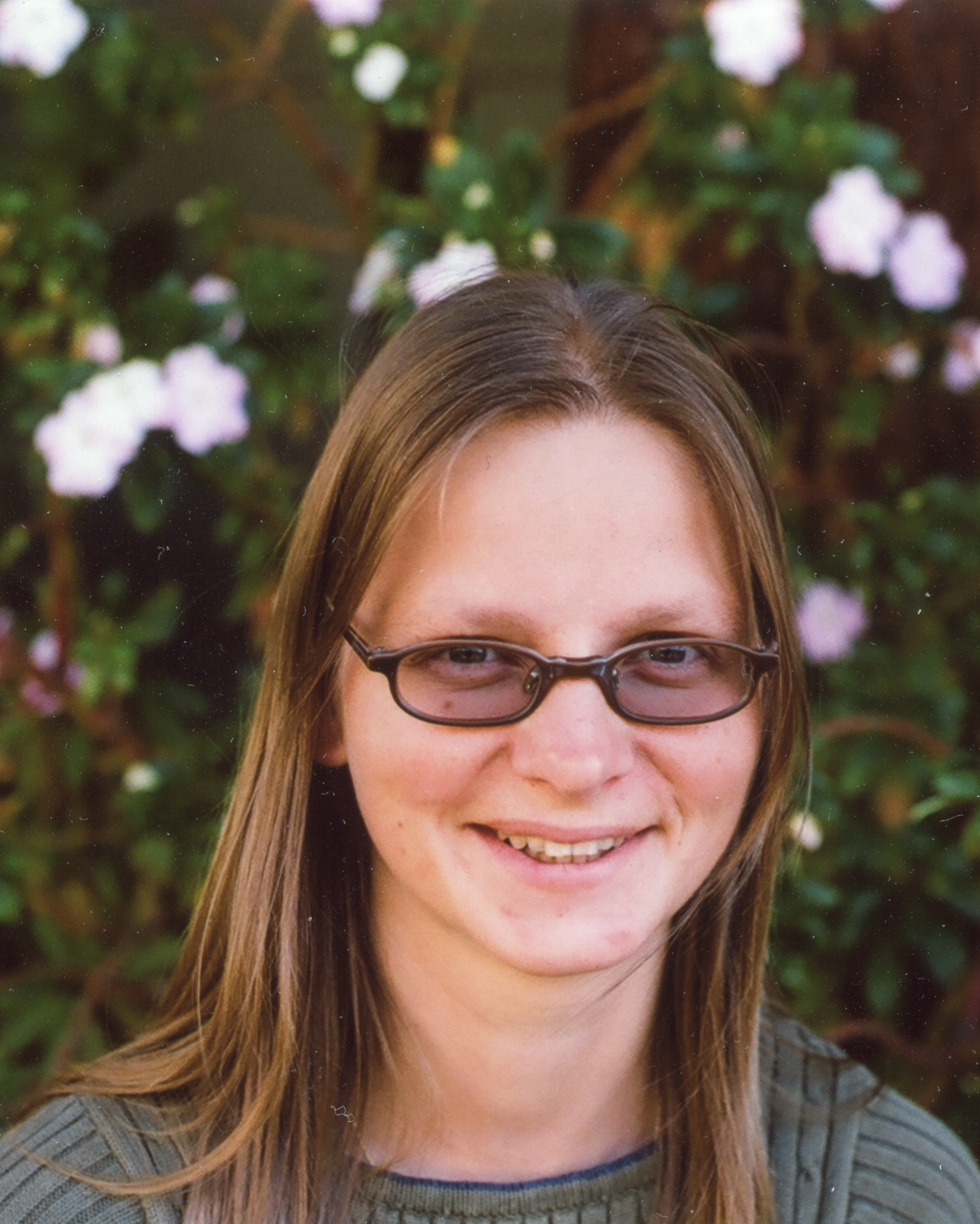
Eugenia Malinnikova at Berkeley, California in 2008

Eugenia Malinnikova (born 23 April 1974) is a mathematician, winner of the 2017 Clay Research Award which she shared with Aleksandr Logunov "in recognition of their introduction of a novel geometric combinatorial method to study doubling properties of solutions to elliptic eigenvalue problems".

== Education and career ==
As a high school student, she competed three times in the International Mathematical Olympiad. She is the highest-scoring female contestant in IMO history. She has 3 Gold medals in IMO, awarded in 1989 (41/42 points), IMO 1990 (42/42) and IMO 1991 (42/42). She is a member of the International Mathematical Olympiad Hall of Fame.

She got her PhD from St. Petersburg State University in 1999, under the supervision of Viktor Petrovich Havin. Currently she works as a professor of mathematics at Stanford University after previously working at the Norwegian University of Science and Technology.

== Recognition ==
In 2018 she was inducted into the Norwegian Academy of Science and Letters. She is also a member of the Royal Norwegian Society of Sciences and Letters and the Norwegian Academy of Technological Sciences. She was elected as a Fellow of the American Mathematical Society in the 2024 class of fellows.
