= Pleated surface =

Type of geometric surface with folds

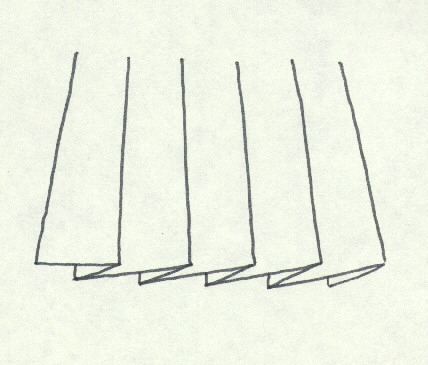
A pleated surface

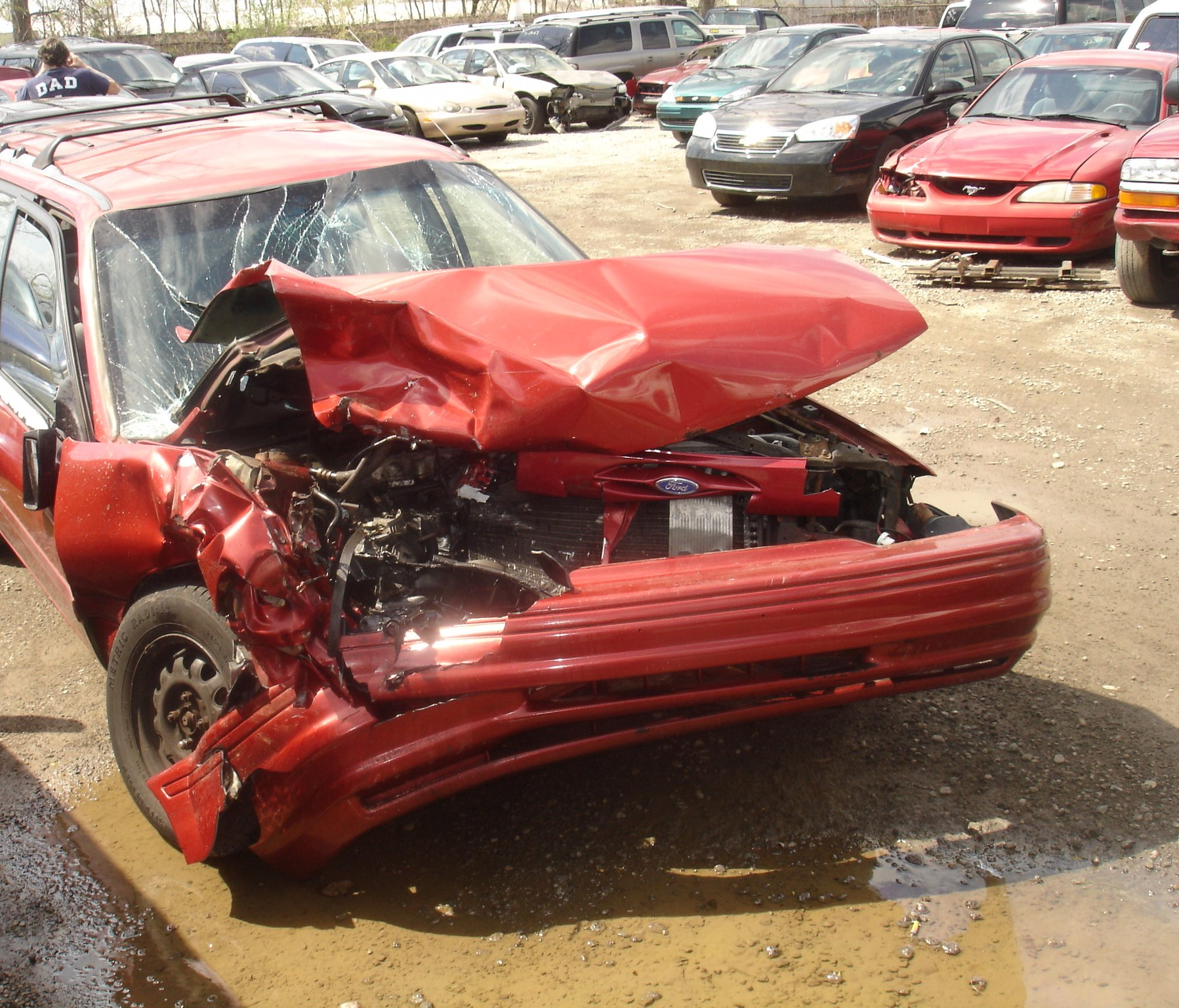
A "crumpled" but not pleated surface with more complicated singularities: there are points where different folds meet.

In geometry, a pleated surface is roughly a surface that may have simple folds but is not crumpled in more complicated ways. More precisely, a pleated surface is an isometry from a complete hyperbolic surface S to a hyperbolic 3-fold such that every point of S is in the interior of a geodesic that is mapped to a geodesic. They were introduced by Thurston (1980, 8.8), where they were called uncrumpled surfaces.

The Universal Book of Mathematics provides the following information about pleated surfaces:

It is a surface in Euclidean space or hyperbolic space that resembles a polyhedron in the sense that it has flat faces that meet along edges. Unlike a polyhedron, a pleated surface has no corners, but it may have infinitely many edges that form a lamination.
