= Aleksandr Logunov (mathematician) =

Russian mathematician (born 1989)

Aleksandr Andreyevich Logunov (Russian: Александр Андреевич Логунов, 5 December 1989) is a Russian mathematician, specializing in harmonic analysis, potential theory, and geometric analysis.

Logunov received his Candidate of Sciences (PhD) in 2015 from the Saint Petersburg State University under Viktor Petrovich Havin (Виктор Петрович Хавин, 1933–2015) with thesis (О граничных свойствах гармонических функций, On boundary properties of harmonic functions). He works at the Chebyshev Mathematics Laboratory of the Saint Petersburg State University and at the University of Tel Aviv.

Logunov received, jointly with Eugenia Malinnikova, the 2017 Clay Research Award for their introduction of novel geometric-combinatorial methods for the study of elliptic eigenvalue problems. He proved, among other results, an estimate (from above) for Hausdorff measures on the zero sets of Laplace eigenfunctions defined on compact smooth manifolds and an estimate (from below) in harmonic analysis and differential geometry that proved conjectures by Shing-Tung Yau and Nikolai Nadirashvili. In 2018 he received the Salem Prize and in 2020 the EMS Prize of the European Mathematical Society. For 2021 he received the Breakthrough Prize in Mathematics – New Horizons in Mathematics.

== Selected publications ==
- Logunov, Alexander (2018). "Nodal sets of Laplace eigenfunctions: polynomial upper estimates of the Hausdorff measure". Annals of Mathematics. 187 (1): 221–239. arXiv:1605.02587. doi:10.4007/annals.2018.187.1.4. S2CID 119170110.
- with Eugenia Malinnikova: Logunov, Alexander; Malinnikova, Eugenia (2015). "On ratios of harmonic functions". Advances in Mathematics. 274: 241–262. arXiv:1402.2888. doi:10.1016/j.aim.2015.01.009.
- with Eugenia Malinnikova: Logunov, Alexander; Malinnikova, Eugenia (2016). "Ratios of harmonic functions with the same zero set". Geometric and Functional Analysis. 26 (3): 909–925. arXiv:1506.08041. doi:10.1007/s00039-016-0369-4.
- Logunov, Alexander (2018). "Nodal sets of Laplace eigenfunctions: proof of Nadirashvili's conjecture and of the lower bound in Yau's conjecture". Annals of Mathematics. 187 (1): 241–262. arXiv:1605.02589. doi:10.4007/annals.2018.187.1.5. S2CID 119176697.
- with Eugenia Malinnikova: Logunov, Alexander; Malinnikova, Eugenia (2018). "Nodal sets of Laplace eigenfunctions: estimates of the Hausdorff measure in dimensions two and three". 50 Years with Hardy Spaces. Operator Theory: Advances and Applications. Vol. 261. pp. 333–344. arXiv:1605.02595. doi:10.1007/978-3-319-59078-3_17. ISBN 978-3-319-59077-6.
