= Yves Benoist =

French mathematician

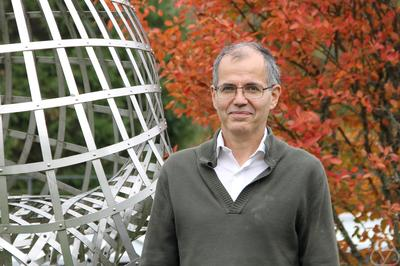
Benoist at the Rigidity of Stationary Measure Workshop, Oberwolfach 2018

Yves Benoist is a French mathematician, known for his work on group dynamics on homogeneous spaces. He is currently a Senior Researcher (Directeur de Recherche) of CNRS at the University of Paris-Sud.

In 1990 Benoist proved a longstanding open conjecture with Patrick Foulon and François Labourie about Anosov flows on compact, negatively curved manifolds. In the 2000s he wrote a series of papers on the divisible convex sets in projective space and periodic tilings by such sets.

In 2011 he was awarded the Clay Research Award along with his former doctoral student, Jean-François Quint. The prize citation highlighted their work on stationary measures and closed orbits for non-abelian group actions on homogeneous spaces, solving a long-standing conjecture of Hillel Furstenberg. They showed that in homogeneous spaces of finite volume, orbits of a Zariski dense subgroup of a semisimple group equidistributed towards algebraic measures.

He gave the 2012 Takagi Lectures in Kyoto at the Research Institute for Mathematical Sciences (RIMS). In 2014 he was an Invited speaker at the International Congress of Mathematicians in Seoul.

== Selected works ==
- Benoist, Yves; Quint, Jean-François (2011). "Mesures stationnaires et fermés invariants des espaces homogènes II". Comptes Rendus Mathematique (in French). 349 (5–6). Elsevier BV: 341–345. doi:10.1016/j.crma.2011.01.015. ISSN 1631-073X.
- Benoist, Yves; Quint, Jean-Francois (29 March 2011). "Random walks on finite volume homogeneous spaces". Inventiones Mathematicae. 187 (1). Springer Science and Business Media LLC: 37–59. doi:10.1007/s00222-011-0328-5. ISSN 0020-9910. S2CID 253741706.
- Benoist, Yves (2001). "Convexes divisibles". Comptes Rendus de l'Académie des Sciences - Series I - Mathematics (in French). 332 (5). Elsevier BV: 387–390. doi:10.1016/s0764-4442(01)01878-x. ISSN 0764-4442.
- Benoist, Yves (1 October 2003). "Convexes divisibles II". Duke Mathematical Journal. 120 (1). Duke University Press. doi:10.1215/s0012-7094-03-12014-1. ISSN 0012-7094.
- Benoist, Yves (2005). "Convexes divisibles III". Annales Scientifiques de l'École Normale Supérieure. 38 (5). Societe Mathematique de France: 793–832. doi:10.1016/j.ansens.2005.07.004. ISSN 0012-9593.
- Benoist, Yves (9 January 2006). "Convexes divisibles IV : Structure du bord en dimension 3". Inventiones Mathematicae (in French). 164 (2). Springer Science and Business Media LLC: 249–278. doi:10.1007/s00222-005-0478-4. ISSN 0020-9910. S2CID 123470471.
- Benoist, Y. (1997). "Propriétés Asymptotiques des Groupes Linéaires". Geometric and Functional Analysis. 7 (1). Springer Science and Business Media LLC: 1–47. doi:10.1007/pl00001613. ISSN 1016-443X. S2CID 126085434.
- Benoist, Yves (1996). "Actions Propres sur les Espaces Homogenes Reductifs". The Annals of Mathematics. 144 (2). JSTOR: 315–347. doi:10.2307/2118594. ISSN 0003-486X. JSTOR 2118594.
- Benoist, Yves; Foulon, Patrick; Labourie, François (1992). "Flots d'Anosov à distributions stable et instable différentiables". Journal of the American Mathematical Society. 5 (1). American Mathematical Society (AMS): 33–74. doi:10.1090/s0894-0347-1992-1124979-1. ISSN 0894-0347.

== Lecture notes on Yves Benoist's work ==
- Jean-François Quint: Convexes divisibles, d'après Yves Benoist. Séminaire Bourbaki, June 2008.
- François Ledrappier: Mesures sur les espaces station aires homogeneous, d'après Yves Benoist et Jean-François Quint Séminaire Bourbaki, 2012.
