= Cyclic surgery theorem =

Limitation on the Dehn fillings of 3-manifolds with cyclic fundamental groups

In three-dimensional topology, a branch of mathematics, the cyclic surgery theorem states that, for a compact, connected, orientable, irreducible three-manifold M whose boundary is a torus T, if M is not a Seifert-fibered space and r,s are slopes on T such that their Dehn fillings have cyclic fundamental group, then the distance between r and s (the minimal number of times that two simple closed curves in T representing r and s must intersect) is at most 1. Consequently, there are at most three Dehn fillings of M with cyclic fundamental group. The theorem appeared in a 1987 paper written by Marc Culler, Cameron Gordon, John Luecke and Peter Shalen.
