= Ending lamination theorem =

In hyperbolic geometry, the ending lamination theorem, originally conjectured by William Thurston (1982) as the eleventh problem out of his twenty-four questions, states that hyperbolic 3-manifolds with finitely generated fundamental groups are determined by their topology together with certain "end invariants", which are geodesic laminations on some surfaces in the boundary of the manifold.

The ending lamination theorem is a generalization of the Mostow rigidity theorem to hyperbolic manifolds of infinite volume. When the manifold is compact or of finite volume, the Mostow rigidity theorem states that the fundamental group determines the manifold. When the volume is infinite the fundamental group is not enough to determine the manifold: one also needs to know the hyperbolic structure on the surfaces at the "ends" of the manifold, and also the ending laminations on these surfaces.

Minsky (2010) and Brock, Canary & Minsky (2012) proved the ending lamination conjecture for Kleinian surface groups. In view of the Tameness theorem this implies the ending lamination conjecture for all finitely generated Kleinian groups, from which the general case of ELT follows.

== Ending laminations ==
Ending laminations were introduced by Thurston (1980, 9.3.6).

Suppose that a hyperbolic 3-manifold has a geometrically tame end of the form S × [0,1) for some compact surface S without boundary, so that S can be thought of as the "points at infinity" of the end. The ending lamination of this end is (roughly) a lamination on the surface S, in other words a closed subset of S that is written as the disjoint union of geodesics of S. It is characterized by the following property. Suppose that there is a sequence of closed geodesics on S whose lifts tends to infinity in the end. Then the limit of these simple geodesics is the ending lamination.

== See also ==
- Kleinian groups
