= Closed manifold =

Topological concept in mathematics

In mathematics, a closed manifold is a manifold without boundary that is compact. In comparison, an open manifold is a manifold without boundary that has only non-compact components.

== Examples ==
The only connected one-dimensional example is a circle. The sphere, torus, and the Klein bottle are all closed two-dimensional manifolds. The real projective space RP^{n} is a closed n-dimensional manifold. The complex projective space CP^{n} is a closed 2n-dimensional manifold. A line is not closed because it is not compact. A closed disk is a compact two-dimensional manifold, but it is not closed because it has a boundary.

== Properties ==
Every closed manifold is a Euclidean neighborhood retract and thus has finitely generated homology groups.

If $M$ is a closed connected n-manifold, the n-th homology group $H_{n}(M;\mathbb{Z})$ is $\mathbb{Z}$ or 0 depending on whether $M$ is orientable or not. Moreover, the torsion subgroup of the (n-1)-th homology group $H_{n-1}(M;\mathbb{Z})$ is 0 or $\mathbb{Z}_2$ depending on whether $M$ is orientable or not. This follows from an application of the universal coefficient theorem.

Let $R$ be a commutative ring. For $R$-orientable $M$ with fundamental class $[M]\in H_{n}(M;R)$, the map $D: H^k(M;R) \to H_{n-k}(M;R)$ defined by $D(\alpha)=[M]\cap\alpha$ is an isomorphism for all k. This is the Poincaré duality. In particular, every closed manifold is $\mathbb{Z}_2$-orientable. So there is always an isomorphism $H^k(M;\mathbb{Z}_2) \cong H_{n-k}(M;\mathbb{Z}_2)$.

== Open manifolds ==
For a connected manifold, "open" is equivalent to "without boundary and non-compact", but for a disconnected manifold, open is stronger. For instance, the disjoint union of a circle and a line is non-compact since a line is non-compact, but this is not an open manifold since the circle (one of its components) is compact.

== Abuse of language ==
Most books generally define a manifold as a space that is, locally, homeomorphic to Euclidean space (along with some other technical conditions), thus by this definition a manifold does not include its boundary when it is embedded in a larger space. However, this definition doesn’t cover some basic objects such as a closed disk, so authors sometimes define a manifold with boundary and abusively say manifold without reference to the boundary. But normally, a compact manifold (compact with respect to its underlying topology) can synonymously be used for closed manifold if the usual definition for manifold is used.

The notion of a closed manifold is unrelated to that of a closed set. A line is a closed subset of the plane, and it is a manifold, but not a closed manifold.

== Use in physics ==
The notion of a "closed universe" can refer to the universe being a closed manifold but more likely refers to the universe being a manifold of constant positive Ricci curvature.

== See also ==
- Tame manifold
