= Andrew Casson =

Mathematician

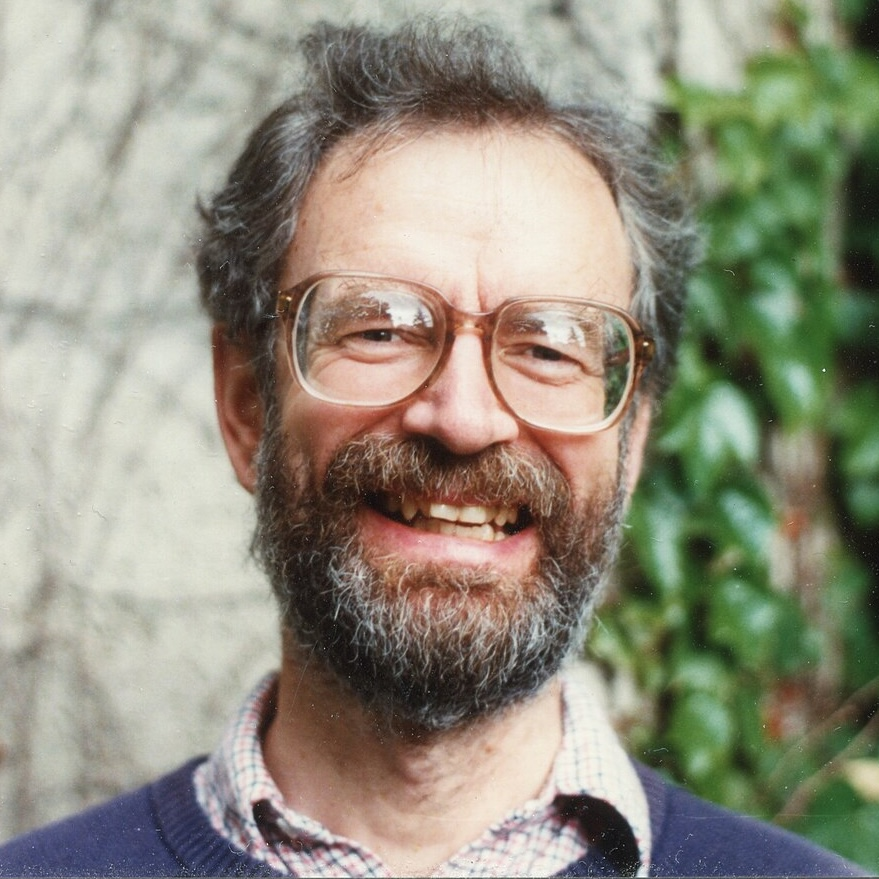
- Casson in 1991
- Born: January 22, 1943; London, England.
- Died: September 5, 2025 (aged 82); Fairfield, Connecticut, U.S.A.
- Education: University of Liverpool
- Awards: Oswald Veblen Prize in Geometry (1991); Fellow of the Royal Society (1998)
- Scientific career
- Fields: Mathematics
- Workplaces: Yale University; University of California, Berkeley; University of Texas at Austin
- Doctoral advisor: C. T. C. Wall
- Doctoral students: Andrew Ranicki, Gregory Kuperberg, Daniel Allcock, Mahan Mitra, Stephen Bigelow, Danny Calegari

Andrew John Casson (January 22, 1943 – September 5, 2025) was a mathematician, working in the area of geometric topology. Casson was the Philip Schuyler Beebe Professor of Mathematics at Yale University until his retirement.

== Education and career ==
Casson was educated at Latymer Upper School and Trinity College, Cambridge, where he graduated with a BA in the Mathematical Tripos in 1965. His doctoral advisor at the University of Liverpool was C. T. C. Wall, but he never completed his doctorate; instead what would have been his Ph.D. thesis became his fellowship dissertation as a research fellow at Trinity College.

Casson was Professor of Mathematics at the University of Texas at Austin from 1981 to 1986, at the University of California, Berkeley from 1986 to 2000, and at Yale from 2000 until his retirement.

== Work ==
Casson worked in both high-dimensional manifold topology and three- and four-dimensional topology, using both geometric and algebraic techniques. Among other discoveries, he contributed to the disproof of the manifold Hauptvermutung, introduced the Casson invariant, a modern invariant for three-manifolds, and Casson handles, used in Michael Freedman's proof of Freedman's classification and subsequently the four-dimensional Poincaré conjecture.

== Awards ==
In 1991, he was awarded the Oswald Veblen Prize in Geometry by the American Mathematical Society. In 1998, he was elected to Fellowship of the Royal Society.
