= Hyperbolic Dehn surgery =

In mathematics, hyperbolic Dehn surgery is an operation by which one can obtain further hyperbolic 3-manifolds from a given cusped hyperbolic 3-manifold. Hyperbolic Dehn surgery exists only in dimension three and is one which distinguishes hyperbolic geometry in three dimensions from other dimensions.

Such an operation is often also called hyperbolic Dehn filling, as Dehn surgery proper refers to a "drill and fill" operation on a link which consists of drilling out a neighborhood of the link and then filling back in with solid tori. Hyperbolic Dehn surgery actually only involves "filling".

We will generally assume that a hyperbolic 3-manifold is complete. Suppose M is a cusped hyperbolic 3-manifold with n cusps. M can be thought of, topologically, as the interior of a compact manifold with toral boundary. Suppose we have chosen a meridian and longitude for each boundary torus, i.e. simple closed curves that are generators for the fundamental group of the torus. Let $M(u_1, u_2, \dots, u_n)$ denote the manifold obtained from M by filling in the i-th boundary torus with a solid torus using the slope $u_i = p_i/q_i$ where each pair $p_i$ and $q_i$ are coprime integers. We allow a $u_i$ to be $\infty$ which means we do not fill in that cusp, i.e. do the "empty" Dehn filling. So M = $M(\infty, \dots, \infty)$.

We equip the space H of finite volume hyperbolic 3-manifolds with the geometric topology.

== Related theorems ==
The Thurston's hyperbolic Dehn surgery theorem states $M(u_1, u_2, \dots, u_n)$ is hyperbolic as long as a finite set of exceptional slopes $E_i$ is avoided for the i-th cusp for each i. $M(u_1, u_2, \dots, u_n)$ converges to M in H as all $p_i^2+q_i^2 \rightarrow \infty$ for all $p_i/q_i$ corresponding to non-empty Dehn fillings $u_i$. This theorem is due to William Thurston and fundamental to the theory of hyperbolic 3-manifolds. It shows that nontrivial limits exist in H.

Troels Jorgensen's study of the geometric topology further shows that all nontrivial limits arise by Dehn filling as in the theorem. Another important result by Thurston is that volume decreases under hyperbolic Dehn filling. The theorem states that volume decreases under topological Dehn filling, assuming of course that the Dehn-filled manifold is hyperbolic. The proof relies on basic properties of the Gromov norm. Jørgensen also showed that the volume function on this space is a continuous, proper function. Thus by the previous results, nontrivial limits in H are taken to nontrivial limits in the set of volumes. In fact, one can further conclude, as did Thurston, that the set of volumes of finite volume hyperbolic 3-manifolds has ordinal type $\omega^\omega$. This result is known as the Thurston-Jørgensen theorem. Further work characterizing this set was done by Gromov.

The figure-eight knot and the (-2, 3, 7) pretzel knot are the only two knots whose complements are known to have more than 6 exceptional surgeries; they have 10 and 7, respectively. Cameron Gordon conjectured that 10 is the largest possible number of exceptional surgeries of any hyperbolic knot complement. This was proved by Marc Lackenby and Rob Meyerhoff, who show that the number of exceptional slopes is 10 for any compact orientable 3-manifold with boundary a torus and interior finite-volume hyperbolic. Their proof relies on the proof of the geometrization conjecture originated by Grigori Perelman and on computer assistance. It is currently unknown whether the figure-eight knot is the only one that achieves the bound of 10. One conjecture is that the bound (except for the two knots mentioned) is 6. Agol has shown that there are only finitely many cases in which the number of exceptional slopes is 9 or 10.
