= Jeffrey Weeks (mathematician) =

American mathematician

Jeffrey Renwick Weeks (born December 10, 1956) is an American mathematician, a geometric topologist and cosmologist. Weeks is a 1999 MacArthur Fellow.

== Biography ==
Weeks received his BA from Dartmouth College in 1978, and his PhD in mathematics from Princeton University in 1985, under the supervision of William Thurston. Since then he has taught at Stockton State College, Ithaca College, and Middlebury College, but has spent much of his time as a free-lance mathematician.

== Research ==
Weeks' research contributions have mainly been in the field of 3-manifolds and physical cosmology.

The Weeks manifold, discovered in 1985 by Weeks, is the hyperbolic 3-manifold with the minimum possible volume. Weeks has written various computer programs to assist in mathematical research and mathematical visualization. His SnapPea program is used to study hyperbolic 3-manifolds, while he has also developed interactive software to introduce these ideas to middle-school, high-school, and college students.

Weeks is particularly interested in using topology to understand the spatial universe. His book The Shape of Space: How to Visualize Surfaces and Three-dimensional Manifolds (Marcel Dekker, 1985, ISBN 0-8247-7437-X) explores the geometry and topology of low-dimensional manifolds. The second edition (2002, ISBN 0-8247-0709-5) explains some of his work in applying the material to cosmology.

== Awards and honors ==
Weeks became a MacArthur Fellow in 1999. In 2007, he won the Levi L. Conant Prize for his expository paper, "The Poincaré Dodecahedral Space and the Mystery of the Missing Fluctuations" (Notices of the AMS 2004), and in 2008 he gave the first Levi Conant Lecture at the Worcester Polytechnic Institute, where Conant was head of the Mathematics Department from 1908 until his untimely death.
