= Cameron Gordon (mathematician) =

British mathematician

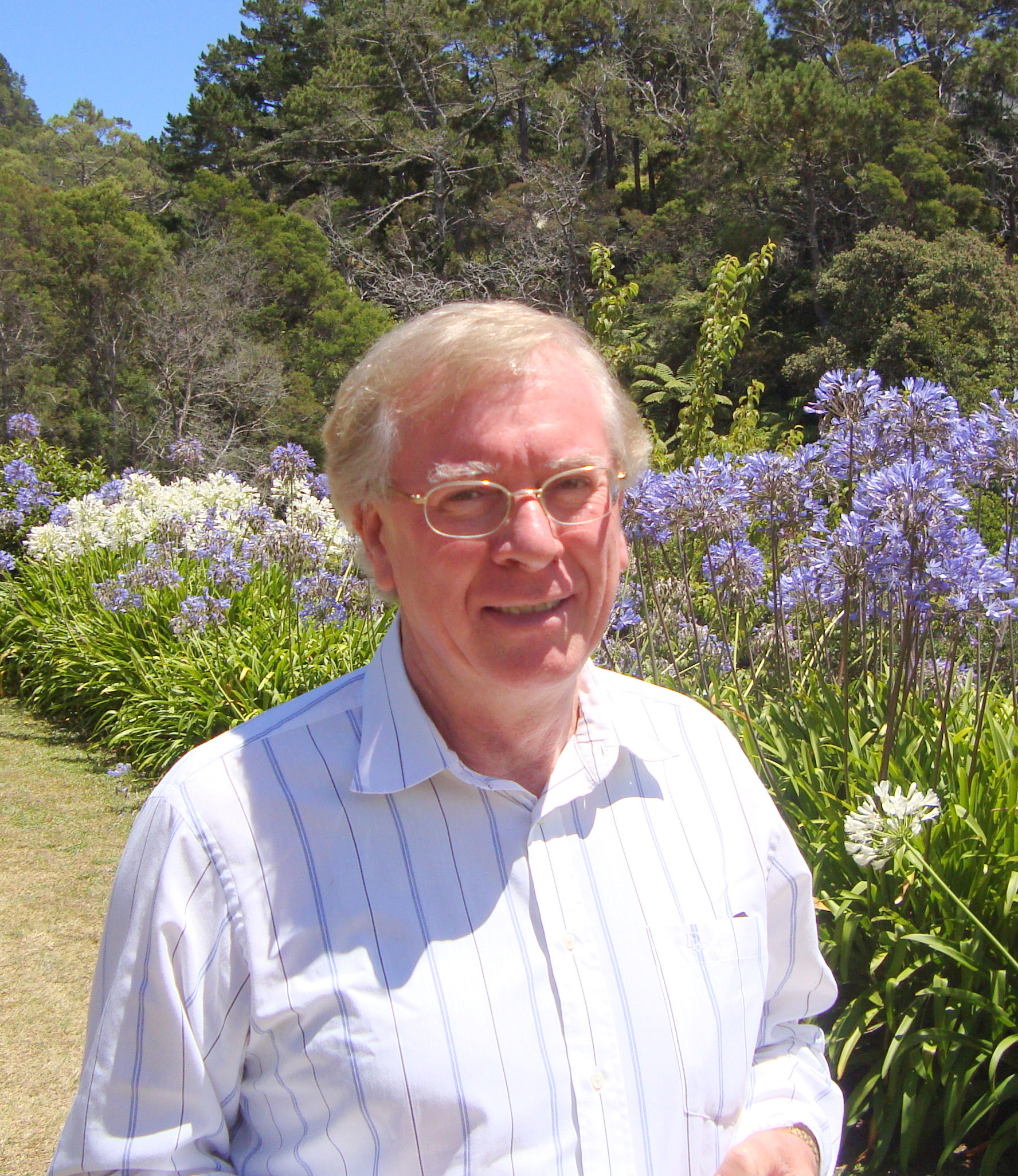
Gordon in 2010

Cameron Gordon (born 1945) is a professor and Sid W. Richardson Foundation regents chair in the Department of Mathematics at the University of Texas at Austin, known for his work in knot theory. Among his notable results is his work with Marc Culler, John Luecke, and Peter Shalen on the cyclic surgery theorem. This was an important ingredient in his work with Luecke showing that knots were determined by their complement. Gordon was also involved in the resolution of the Smith conjecture.

Andrew Casson and Gordon defined and proved basic theorems regarding strongly irreducible Heegaard splittings, an important concept in the modernization of Heegaard splitting theory. They also worked on the slice-ribbon conjecture, inventing the Casson-Gordon invariants in the process.

Gordon was a 1999 Guggenheim Fellow. In 2005, Gordon was elected a Corresponding fellow of the Royal Society of Edinburgh. In 2023, Gordon was elected to the National Academy of Sciences.
