= Tame manifold =

In geometry, a tame manifold is a manifold with a well-behaved compactification. More precisely, a manifold $M$ is called tame if it is homeomorphic to a compact manifold with a closed subset of the boundary removed.

The Whitehead manifold is an example of a contractible manifold that is not tame.

== See also ==
- Closed manifold – Topological concept in mathematics
- Tameness theorem
