= Danny Calegari =

American mathematician

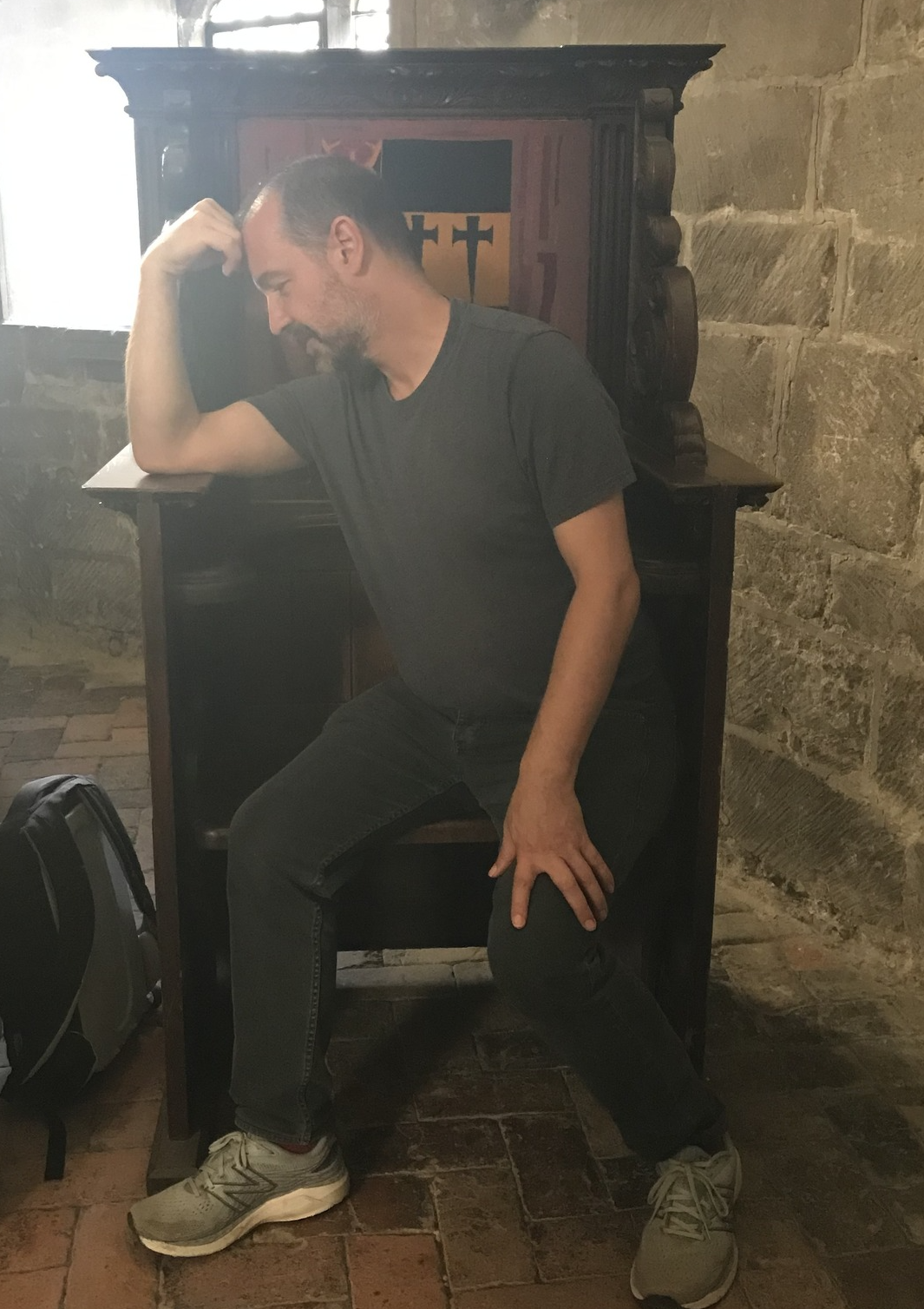
- Danny Calegari
- Education: University of California, Berkeley; University of Melbourne
- Scientific career
- Fields: Mathematics
- Workplaces: University of Chicago
- Thesis: Foliations and the Geometry of Three-Manifolds (2000)
- Doctoral advisor: Andrew Casson; William Thurston

Notes
- Brother of Frank Calegari

Danny Matthew Cornelius Calegari is a mathematician and, as of 2023, a professor of mathematics at the University of Chicago. His research interests include geometry, dynamical systems, low-dimensional topology, and geometric group theory.

== Education and career ==
In 1994, Calegari received a B.A. in Mathematics from the University of Melbourne with honors. He received his Ph.D. in 2000 from the University of California, Berkeley under the joint supervision of Andrew Casson and William Thurston; his dissertation concerned foliations of three-dimensional manifolds.

From 2000–2002 he was Benjamin Peirce Assistant Professor at Harvard University, after which he joined the California Institute of Technology faculty; he became Merkin Professor in 2007. He was a University Professor of Pure Mathematics at the University of Cambridge in 2011–2012, and has been a Professor of Mathematics at the University of Chicago since 2012.

Calegari is also an author of short fiction, published in Quadrant, Southerly, and Overland. His story A Green Light was a winner of a 1992 The Age Short Story Award.

== Awards ==
Calegari was one of the recipients of the 2009 Clay Research Award for his solution to the Marden Tameness Conjecture and the Ahlfors Measure Conjecture. In 2011 he was awarded a Royal Society Wolfson Research Merit Award, and in 2012, he became a Fellow of the American Mathematical Society. In 2012 he delivered the Namboodiri Lectures at the University of Chicago, and in 2013 he delivered the Blumenthal Lectures at Tel Aviv University. In 2022 he gave an invited lecture at the ICM and in 2024 he gave the Floer Lectures in Bochum and the Roever Lecture at Washington University in St. Louis.

== Selected works ==
- Calegari, Danny (2007). Foliations and the geometry of 3-manifolds. Oxford Mathematical Monographs. Oxford: Oxford University Press. pp. xiv+363 pp. ISBN 978-0-19-857008-0. MR 2327361.
- Calegari, Danny (2009). scl (stable commutator length). MSJ Memoirs. Vol. 20. Tokyo: Mathematical Society of Japan. pp. xii+209 pp. ISBN 978-4-931469-53-2. MR 2527432.
- Calegari, Danny (1999). "$\R$-covered foliations of hyperbolic 3-manifolds". Geometry & Topology. 3: 137–153. arXiv:math/9808064. doi:10.2140/gt.1999.3.137. MR 1695533. S2CID 8716835.
- Calegari, Danny; Dunfield, Nathan (2003). "Laminations and groups of homeomorphisms of the circle". Inventiones Mathematicae. 152 (1): 149–204. arXiv:math/0203192. Bibcode:2003InMat.152..149D. doi:10.1007/s00222-002-0271-6. MR 1965363. S2CID 15149654.
- Calegari, Danny (2006). "Promoting essential laminations". Inventiones Mathematicae. 166 (3): 583–643. arXiv:math/0210148. Bibcode:2006InMat.166..583C. doi:10.1007/s00222-006-0004-3. MR 2257392. S2CID 13985835.
- Calegari, Danny; Gabai, David (2006). "Shrinkwrapping and the taming of hyperbolic 3-manifolds". Journal of the American Mathematical Society. 19 (2): 385–446. arXiv:math/0407161. doi:10.1090/S0894-0347-05-00513-8. MR 2188131. S2CID 1053364.
- Calegari, Danny (2006). "Universal circles for quasigeodesic flows". Geometry & Topology. 10 (4): 2271–2298. arXiv:math/0406040. doi:10.2140/gt.2006.10.2271. S2CID 5604620.
- Calegari, Danny (2008). "What is stable commutator length?" (PDF). Notices of the American Mathematical Society. 55 (9): 1100–1101. MR 2451345.

== Personal life ==
Mathematician Frank Calegari is Danny Calegari's brother.
