= William Floyd (mathematician) =

American mathematician

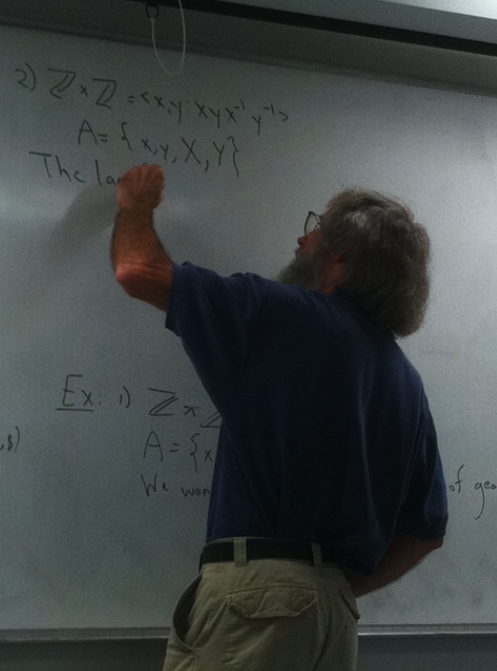
Dr. Floyd discusses languages over the integer lattice.

William J. Floyd is an American mathematician specializing in topology. He is currently a professor at Virginia Polytechnic Institute and State University. Floyd received a PhD in mathematics from Princeton University 1978 under the direction of William Thurston.

== Mathematical contributions ==
Most of Floyd's research is in the areas of geometric topology and geometric group theory.

Floyd and Allen Hatcher classified all the incompressible surfaces in punctured-torus bundles over the circle.

In a 1980 paper Floyd introduced a way to compactify a finitely generated group by adding to it a boundary which came to be called the Floyd boundary. Floyd also wrote a number of joint papers with James W. Cannon and Walter R. Parry exploring a combinatorial approach to the Cannon conjecture using finite subdivision rules. This represents one of the few plausible lines of attack of the conjecture.
