= Marc Culler =

American mathematician

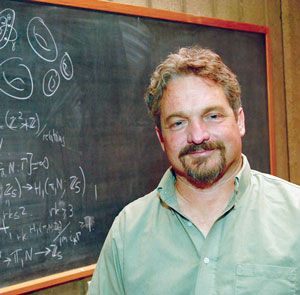
- Photograph by Roberta Devlin
- Born: November 22, 1953 (age 72)
- Education: University of California, Berkeley
- Known for: cyclic surgery theorem Culler–Vogtmann Outer space
- Scientific career
- Fields: geometric group theory low-dimensional topology
- Doctoral advisor: John Robert Stallings

Marc Edward Culler (born November 22, 1953) is an American mathematician who works in geometric group theory and low-dimensional topology. A native Californian, Culler did his undergraduate work at the University of California at Santa Barbara and his graduate work at Berkeley where he graduated in 1978. He is now a professor emeritus at the University of Illinois at Chicago. Culler is the son of Glen Jacob Culler who was an important early innovator in the development of the Internet.

== Work ==
Culler specializes in group theory, low dimensional topology, 3-manifolds, and hyperbolic geometry. Culler frequently collaborates with Peter Shalen and they have co-authored many papers. Culler and Shalen did joint work that related properties of representation varieties of hyperbolic 3-manifold groups to decompositions of 3-manifolds. In particular, Culler and Shalen used the Bass–Serre theory, applied to the function field of the SL(2,C)-Character variety of a 3-manifold, to obtain information about incompressible surfaces in the manifold. Based on this work, Shalen, Cameron Gordon, John Luecke, and Culler proved the cyclic surgery theorem.

Another important contribution by Culler came in a 1986 paper with Karen Vogtmann called "Moduli of graphs and automorphisms of free groups". This paper introduced an object that came to be known as Culler–Vogtmann Outer space.

Culler is one of the authors of a 1994 paper called "Plane curves associated to character varieties of 3-manifolds" which introduced the A-polynomial of a knot or, more generally, of a 3-manifold with one torus boundary component.

Culler is an editor of The New York Journal of Mathematics. He was a Sloan Foundation Research Fellow (1986–1988) and a UIC University Scholar (2008). In 2014, he became a Fellow of the American Mathematical Society.

== Selected publications ==
- Culler, Marc; Shalen, Peter B.; Varieties of group representations and splittings of 3-manifolds. Annals of Mathematics. (2) 117 (1983), no. 1, 109–146.
- Culler, Marc; Gordon, C. McA.; Luecke, J.; Shalen, Peter B. Dehn surgery on knots. Annals of Mathematics (2) 125 (1987), no. 2, 237–300.
- Marc Culler and Karen Vogtmann; A group-theoretic criterion for property A. Proc. Amer. Math. Soc., 124(3):677—683, 1996. MR 1307506
