= William Thurston =

American mathematician (1946–2012)

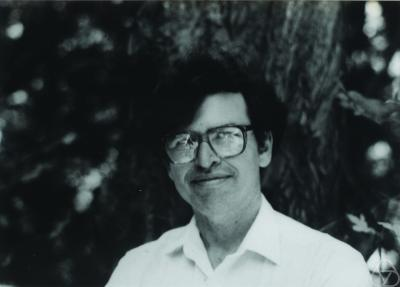
- Thurston in 1991
- Born: William Paul Thurston; October 30, 1946; Washington, D.C., U.S.
- Died: August 21, 2012 (aged 65); Rochester, New York, U.S.
- Education: New College of Florida; University of California, Berkeley
- Known for: Thurston's geometrization conjecture Thurston's 24 questions Thurston's theory of surfaces Milnor–Thurston kneading theory Orbifold; And many other concepts (linked at See also section)
- Awards: Fields Medal (1982); Oswald Veblen Prize in Geometry (1976); Alan T. Waterman Award (1979); National Academy of Sciences (1983); Doob Prize (2005); Leroy P. Steele Prize (2012).
- Scientific career
- Fields: Mathematics
- Workplaces: Cornell University; University of California, Davis; Mathematical Sciences Research Institute; University of California, Berkeley; Princeton University; Massachusetts Institute of Technology; Institute for Advanced Study
- Thesis: Foliations of three-manifolds which are circle bundles (1972)
- Doctoral advisor: Morris Hirsch
- Doctoral students: Danny Calegari; Richard Canary; Benson Farb; David Gabai; William Goldman; Richard Kenyon; Steven Kerckhoff; Yair Minsky; Igor Rivin; Oded Schramm; Richard Schwartz; Jeffrey Weeks

William Paul Thurston (October 30, 1946 – August 21, 2012) was an American mathematician. He was a pioneer in the field of low-dimensional topology and was awarded the Fields Medal in 1982 for his contributions to the study of 3-manifolds.

Thurston was a professor of mathematics at Princeton University, University of California, Davis, and Cornell University. He was also a director of the Mathematical Sciences Research Institute.

== Early life and education ==
William Thurston was born in Washington, D.C., to Margaret Thurston (née Martt), a seamstress, and Paul Thurston, an aeronautical engineer. William Thurston suffered from congenital strabismus as a child, causing issues with depth perception. His mother worked with him as a toddler to reconstruct three-dimensional images from two-dimensional ones.

He received his bachelor's degree from New College in 1967 as part of its inaugural class. For his undergraduate thesis, he developed an intuitionist foundation for topology. Taking advantage of New College's liberal attitude towards student living arrangements, Thurston at various times lived in a tent in nearby woods or slept in academic buildings.

Following this, he received a doctorate in mathematics from the University of California, Berkeley, under Morris Hirsch, with a thesis titled Foliations of Three-Manifolds which are Circle Bundles in 1972.

== Career ==
After completing his Ph.D., Thurston spent a year at the Institute for Advanced Study, then another year at the Massachusetts Institute of Technology as an assistant professor.

In 1974, Thurston was appointed a full professor at Princeton University. He returned to Berkeley in 1991 to be a professor (1991-1996) and was also director of the Mathematical Sciences Research Institute (MSRI) from 1992 to 1997. He was on the faculty at UC Davis from 1996 until 2003, when he moved to Cornell University.

Thurston was an early adopter of computing in pure mathematics research. He inspired Jeffrey Weeks to develop the SnapPea computing program.

During Thurston's directorship at MSRI, the institute introduced several innovative educational programs that have since become standard for research institutes.

His Ph.D. students include Danny Calegari, Richard Canary, Benson Farb, William Floyd, David Gabai, William Goldman, Richard Kenyon, Steven Kerckhoff, Yair Minsky, Igor Rivin, Oded Schramm, Richard Schwartz, and Jeffrey Weeks.

== Research ==
=== Foliations ===
His early work, in the early 1970s, was mainly in foliation theory. His more significant results include:

- The proof that every Haefliger structure on a manifold can be integrated to a foliation (this implies, in particular, that every manifold with zero Euler characteristic admits a foliation of codimension one).
- The construction of a continuous family of smooth, codimension-one foliations on the three-sphere whose Godbillon–Vey invariants (after Claude Godbillon and Jacques Vey) take every real value. This disproved a prevalent conjecture held by topologists that the Godbillon-Vey invariant had to be an integer value.
- With John N. Mather, he gave a proof that the cohomology of the group of homeomorphisms of a manifold is the same whether the group is considered with its discrete topology or its compact-open topology.

In fact, Thurston resolved so many outstanding problems in foliation theory in such a short period of time that it led to an exodus from the field, where advisors counselled students against going into foliation theory, because Thurston was "cleaning out the subject"

(see "On Proof and Progress in Mathematics", especially section 6[11]).
Thurston's work on foliations was later collected and expanded in his influential lecture notes and papers, which shaped subsequent research in geometric topology. His approach introduced new connections between foliation theory and the broader study of 3-manifolds, setting the stage for his later work on geometrization.[12]

=== The geometrization conjecture ===
His later work, starting around the mid-1970s, revealed that hyperbolic geometry played a far more important role in the general theory of 3-manifolds than was previously realised. Prior to Thurston, there were only a handful of known examples of hyperbolic 3-manifolds of finite volume, such as the Seifert–Weber space. The independent and distinct approaches of Robert Riley and Troels Jørgensen in the mid-to-late 1970s showed that such examples were less atypical than previously believed; in particular their work showed that the figure-eight knot complement was hyperbolic. This was the first example of a hyperbolic knot.

Inspired by their work, Thurston took a different, more explicit means of exhibiting the hyperbolic structure of the figure-eight knot complement. He showed that the figure-eight knot complement could be decomposed as the union of two regular ideal hyperbolic tetrahedra whose hyperbolic structures matched up correctly and gave the hyperbolic structure on the figure-eight knot complement. By utilizing Haken's normal surface techniques, he classified the incompressible surfaces in the knot complement. Together with his analysis of deformations of hyperbolic structures, he concluded that all but 10 Dehn surgeries on the figure-eight knot resulted in irreducible, non-Haken non-Seifert-fibered 3-manifolds. These were the first such examples; previously it had been believed that except for certain Seifert fiber spaces, all irreducible 3-manifolds were Haken. These examples were actually hyperbolic and motivated his next theorem.

Thurston proved that in fact most Dehn fillings on a cusped hyperbolic 3-manifold resulted in hyperbolic 3-manifolds. This is his celebrated hyperbolic Dehn surgery theorem.

To complete the picture, Thurston proved a hyperbolization theorem for Haken manifolds. A particularly important corollary is that many knots and links are in fact hyperbolic. Together with his hyperbolic Dehn surgery theorem, this showed that closed hyperbolic 3-manifolds existed in great abundance.

The hyperbolization theorem for Haken manifolds has been called Thurston's Monster Theorem, due to the length and difficulty of the proof. Complete proofs were not written up until almost 20 years later. The proof involves a number of deep and original insights which have linked many apparently disparate fields to 3-manifolds.

Thurston was next led to formulate his geometrization conjecture. This gave a conjectural picture of 3-manifolds which indicated that all 3-manifolds admitted a certain kind of geometric decomposition involving eight geometries, now called Thurston model geometries. Hyperbolic geometry is the most prevalent geometry in this picture and also the most complicated. The conjecture was proved by Grigori Perelman in 2002–2003.

=== Density conjecture ===
Thurston and Dennis Sullivan generalized Lipman Bers' density conjecture from singly degenerate Kleinian surface groups to all finitely generated Kleinian groups in the late 1970s and early 1980s. The conjecture states that every finitely generated Kleinian group is an algebraic limit of geometrically finite Kleinian groups, and was independently proven by Ohshika and Namazi–Souto in 2011 and 2012 respectively.

=== Orbifold theorem ===
In his work on hyperbolic Dehn surgery, Thurston realized that orbifold structures naturally arose. Such structures had been studied prior to Thurston, but his work, particularly the next theorem, would bring them to prominence. In 1981, he announced the orbifold theorem, an extension of his geometrization theorem to the setting of 3-orbifolds. Two teams of mathematicians around 2000 finally finished their efforts to write down a complete proof, based mostly on Thurston's lectures given in the early 1980s in Princeton. His original proof relied partly on Richard S. Hamilton's work on the Ricci flow.

== Awards and honors ==
In 1976, Thurston and James Harris Simons shared the Oswald Veblen Prize in Geometry.

Thurston received the Fields Medal in 1982 for "revolutioniz[ing] [the] study of topology in 2 and 3 dimensions, showing interplay between analysis, topology, and geometry" and "contribut[ing] [the] idea that a very large class of closed 3-manifolds carry a hyperbolic structure."

In 2005, Thurston won the first American Mathematical Society Book Prize, for Three-dimensional Geometry and Topology. The prize "recognizes an outstanding research book that makes a seminal contribution to the research literature". He was awarded the 2012 Leroy P. Steele Prize by the American Mathematical Society for seminal contribution to research. The citation described his work as having "revolutionized 3-manifold theory".

== Personal life ==
Thurston met his first wife, Rachel Findley, as members of New College's inaugural class. They had three children: Dylan, Nathaniel, and Emily. Dylan was a MOSP participant (1988–90) and is a mathematician at Boston College. Thurston had two children with his second wife, Julian Muriel Thurston: Hannah Jade and Liam.

Thurston died on August 21, 2012, in Rochester, New York, of a sinus mucosal melanoma that was diagnosed in 2011.

== Selected publications ==
- William Thurston, The geometry and topology of three-manifolds, Princeton lecture notes (1978–1981).
- William Thurston, Three-dimensional geometry and topology. Vol. 1. Edited by Silvio Levy. Princeton Mathematical Series, 35. Princeton University Press, Princeton, New Jersey, 1997. x+311 pp. ISBN 0-691-08304-5
- William Thurston, Hyperbolic structures on 3-manifolds. I. Deformation of acylindrical manifolds. Ann. of Math. (2) 124 (1986), no. 2, 203–246.
- William Thurston, Three-dimensional manifolds, Kleinian groups and hyperbolic geometry, Bull. Amer. Math. Soc. (N.S.) 6 (1982), 357–381.
- William Thurston, On the geometry and dynamics of diffeomorphisms of surfaces. Bull. Amer. Math. Soc. (N.S.) 19 (1988), no. 2, 417–431
- Epstein, David B. A.; Cannon, James W.; Holt, Derek F.; Levy, Silvio V. F.; Paterson, Michael S.; Thurston, William P. Word Processing in Groups. Jones and Bartlett Publishers, Boston, Massachusetts, 1992. xii+330 pp. ISBN 0-86720-244-0
- Eliashberg, Yakov M.; Thurston, William P. Confoliations. University Lecture Series, 13. American Mathematical Society, Providence, Rhode Island and Providence Plantations, 1998. x+66 pp. ISBN 0-8218-0776-5
- William Thurston, On proof and progress in mathematics. Bull. Amer. Math. Soc. (N.S.) 30 (1994) 161–177
- William P. Thurston, "Mathematical education". Notices of the AMS 37:7 (September 1990) pp 844–850

== See also ==
- Automatic group
- Cannon–Thurston map
- Circle packing theorem
- Hyperbolic volume
- Hyperbolic Dehn surgery
- Thurston boundary
- Milnor–Thurston kneading theory
- Misiurewicz–Thurston points
- Nielsen–Thurston classification
- Normal surface
- Orbifold notation
- Thurston norm
- Thurston's 24 questions
- Thurston's double limit theorem
- Thurston elliptization conjecture
- Thurston's geometrization conjecture
- Thurston's height condition
- Thurston's orbifold theorem
- Earthquake theorem
