= Richard Canary =

American mathematician

Richard Douglas Canary
- Education: Princeton University (Ph.D.)
- Awards: Sloan Research Fellow (1993)
- Scientific career
- Fields: Low-dimensional topology
- Workplaces: University of Michigan
- Thesis: Hyperbolic Structures on 3-Manifolds with Compressible Boundaries (1989)
- Doctoral advisor: William Paul Thurston

Richard Douglas Canary (born in 1962) is an American mathematician working mainly on low-dimensional topology. He is a professor at the University of Michigan.

Canary obtained his Ph.D. from Princeton University in 1989 under the supervision of William Paul Thurston, with the thesis Hyperbolic Structures on 3-Manifolds with Compressible Boundaries.

He received a Sloan Research Fellowship in 1993.

In 2015 he became a fellow of the American Mathematical Society, "for contributions to low-dimensional topology and hyperbolic geometry as well as for service and teaching in mathematics."
