= David Gabai =

American mathematician

- Born: July 7, 1954 (age 72)
- Education: Princeton University; MIT
- Known for: Low-dimensional topology
- Awards: Oswald Veblen Prize in Geometry (2004); Clay Research Award (2009)
- Scientific career
- Fields: Mathematics
- Workplaces: Princeton University; Caltech
- Doctoral advisor: William Thurston
- Doctoral students: Maggie Miller

David Gabai is an American mathematician and the Hughes-Rogers Professor of Mathematics at Princeton University. His research focuses on low-dimensional topology and hyperbolic geometry.

== Biography ==
David Gabai received his B.S. in mathematics from MIT in 1976 and his Ph.D. in mathematics from Princeton University in 1980. Gabai completed his doctoral dissertation, titled "Foliations and genera of links", under the supervision of William Thurston.

After positions at Harvard and University of Pennsylvania, Gabai spent most of the period of 1986–2001 at Caltech, and has been at Princeton since 2001. Gabai was the Chair of the Department of Mathematics at Princeton University from 2012 to 2019.

== Honours and awards ==
In 2004, David Gabai was awarded the Oswald Veblen Prize in Geometry, given every three years by the American Mathematical Society.

He was an invited speaker in the International Congress of Mathematicians 2010, Hyderabad on the topic of topology.

In 2011, he was elected to the United States National Academy of Sciences. In 2012, he became a fellow of the American Mathematical Society.

Gabai was elected as a member of the American Academy of Arts and Sciences in 2014.

== Selected works ==
- Foliations and the topology of 3-manifolds; I: J. Differential Geom. 18 (1983), no. 3, 445–503; II: J. Differential Geom. 26 (1987), no. 3, 461–478; III: J. Differential Geom. 26 (1987), no. 3, 479–536.
- with U. Oertel: Essential laminations in 3-manifolds, Ann. of Math. (2) 130 (1989), no. 1, 41–73.
- Convergence groups are Fuchsian groups, Ann. of Math. (2) 136 (1992), no. 3, 447–510.
- with G. R. Meyerhoff, N. Thurston: Homotopy hyperbolic 3-manifolds are hyperbolic, Ann. of Math. (2) 157 (2003), no. 2, 335–431.
- with D. Calegari: Shrinkwrapping and the taming of hyperbolic 3-manifolds, J. Amer. Math. Soc. 19 (2006), no. 2, 385–446.
- with G. R. Meyerhoff, P. Milley: Minimum volume cusped hyperbolic three-manifolds, J. Amer. Math. Soc. 22 (2009), no. 4, 1157–1215.
