= Glossary of differential geometry and topology =

This is a glossary of terms specific to differential geometry and differential topology. The following three glossaries are closely related:

- Glossary of general topology
- Glossary of algebraic topology
- Glossary of Riemannian and metric geometry.

See also:

- List of differential geometry topics

Words in italics denote a self-reference to this glossary.

== A ==
- Atlas

== B ==
- Bundle – see fiber bundle.
- Basic element – A basic element $x$ with respect to an element $y$ is an element of a cochain complex $(C^*, d)$ (e.g., complex of differential forms on a manifold) that is closed: $dx = 0$ and the contraction of $x$ by $y$ is zero.

== C ==
- Characteristic class
- Chart
- Cobordism
- Codimension – The codimension of a submanifold is the dimension of the ambient space minus the dimension of the submanifold.
- Connected sum
- Connection
- Cotangent bundle – the vector bundle of cotangent spaces on a manifold.
- Cotangent space
- Covering
- Cusp
- CW-complex

== D ==
- Dehn twist
- Diffeomorphism – Given two differentiable manifolds $M$ and $N$, a bijective map $f$ from $M$ to $N$ is called a diffeomorphism – if both $f:M\to N$ and its inverse $f^{-1}:N\to M$ are smooth functions.
- Differential form
- Domain invariance
- Doubling – Given a manifold $M$ with boundary, doubling is taking two copies of $M$ and identifying their boundaries. As the result we get a manifold without boundary.

== E ==
- Embedding
- Exotic structure – See exotic sphere and exotic $\R^4$.

== F ==
- Fiber – In a fiber bundle, $\pi:E \to B$ the preimage $\pi^{-1}(x)$ of a point $x$ in the base $B$ is called the fiber over $x$, often denoted $E_x$.
- Fiber bundle
- Frame – A frame at a point of a differentiable manifold M is a basis of the tangent space at the point.
- Frame bundle – the principal bundle of frames on a smooth manifold.
- Flow

== G ==
- Genus
- Germ
- Grassmannian bundle
- Grassmannian manifold

== H ==
- Handle decomposition
- Hypersurface – A hypersurface is a submanifold of codimension one.

== I ==
- Immersion
- Integration along fibers
- Irreducible manifold
- Isotopy

== J ==
- Jet
- Jordan curve theorem

== L ==
- Lens space – A lens space is a quotient of the 3-sphere (or (2n + 1)-sphere) by a free isometric action of Z – _{k}.
- Local diffeomorphism

== M ==
- Manifold – A topological manifold is a locally Euclidean Hausdorff space (usually also required to be second-countable). For a given regularity (e.g. piecewise-linear, $C^k$ or $C^\infty$ differentiable, real or complex analytic, Lipschitz, Hölder, quasi-conformal...), a manifold of that regularity is a topological manifold whose charts transitions have the prescribed regularity.
- Manifold with boundary
- Manifold with corners
- Mapping class group
- Morse function

== N ==
- Neat submanifold – A submanifold whose boundary equals its intersection with the boundary of the manifold into which it is embedded.

== O ==
- Orbifold
- Orientation of a vector bundle

== P ==
- Pair of pants – An orientable compact surface with 3 boundary components. All compact orientable surfaces can be reconstructed by gluing pairs of pants along their boundary components.
- Parallelizable – A smooth manifold is parallelizable if it admits a smooth global frame. This is equivalent to the tangent bundle being trivial.
- Partition of unity
- PL-map
- Poincaré lemma
- Principal bundle – A principal bundle is a fiber bundle $P \to B$ together with an action on $P$ by a Lie group $G$ that preserves the fibers of $P$ and acts simply transitively on those fibers.
- Pullback

== R ==
- Rham cohomology

== S ==
- Section
- Seifert fiber space
- Submanifold – the image of a smooth embedding of a manifold.
- Submersion
- Surface – a two-dimensional manifold or submanifold.
- Systole – least length of a noncontractible loop.

== T ==
- Tangent bundle – the vector bundle of tangent spaces on a differentiable manifold.
- Tangent field – a section of the tangent bundle. Also called a vector field.
- Tangent space
- Thom space
- Torus
- Transversality – Two submanifolds $M$ and $N$ intersect transversally if at each point of intersection p their tangent spaces $T_p(M)$ and $T_p(N)$ generate the whole tangent space at p of the total manifold.
- Triangulation
- Trivialization
- Tubular neighborhood

== V ==
- Vector bundle – a fiber bundle whose fibers are vector spaces and whose transition functions are linear maps.
- Vector field – a section of a vector bundle. More specifically, a vector field can mean a section of the tangent bundle.

== W ==
- Whitney sum – A Whitney sum is an analog of the direct product for vector bundles. Given two vector bundles $\alpha$ and $\beta$ over the same base $B$ their cartesian product is a vector bundle over $B\times B$. The diagonal map $B\to B\times B$ induces a vector bundle over $B$ called the Whitney sum of these vector bundles and denoted by $\alpha \oplus \beta$.
- Whitney topologies
