= Exotic R4 =

Smooth 4-manifold homeomorphic yet not diffeomorphic to Euclidean space

In mathematics, an exotic $\R^4$ is a differentiable manifold that is homeomorphic (i.e. shape preserving) but not diffeomorphic (i.e. non smooth) to the Euclidean space $\R^4.$ The first examples were found in 1982 by Michael Freedman and others, by using the contrast between Freedman's theorems about topological 4-manifolds, and Simon Donaldson's theorems about smooth 4-manifolds. There is a continuum of non-diffeomorphic differentiable structures $\R^4,$ as was shown first by Clifford Taubes.

Prior to this construction, non-diffeomorphic smooth structures on spheres – exotic spheres – were already known to exist, although the question of the existence of such structures for the particular case of the 4-sphere remains open as of 2026. For any positive integer n other than 4, there are no exotic smooth structures $\R^n;$ in other words, if n ≠ 4 then any smooth manifold homeomorphic to $\R^n$ is diffeomorphic to $\R^n.$

== Construction ==
=== Construction from the failure of smooth surgery theory ===
Exotic $\R^4$ arise from the failure of smooth surgery theory, in particular glueing a disc $D^4$ to its boundary sphere $S^3$ not resulting in a smooth 4-manifold. Exotic 7-spheres called Milnor spheres arise from a fully analogous failure of glueing a disc $D^8$ to its boundary sphere $S^7$ not resulting in a smooth 8-manifold. But the conclusions are different: In the latter case, $D^8\cong\mathbb{R}^8$ has no exotic smooth structure, so $S^7$ has to in order to explain the failure. In the former case, $S^3$ has no exotic smooth structure due to Moise's theorem, so $D^4\cong\mathbb{R}^4$ has to in order to explain the failure.

==== Construction from the K3 surface ====
A concrete construction is the K3 surface $\mathrm{K3}$, described by the homogenous equation $x^4+y^4+z^4+w^4=0$ in twistor space $\mathbb{C}P^3$. According to Freedman's classification, it is homeomorphic to the connected sum $2\overline{M_{E_8}}\#3(S^2\times S^2)$ of twice the orientation-reversed E8 manifold $M_{E_8}$ and thrice the complex surface $S^2\times S^2\cong\mathbb{C}P^1\times\mathbb{C}P^1$ gained from the product of the Riemann sphere with itself. Although $\mathrm{K3}$ is a smooth 4-manifold, $2\overline{M_{E_8}}\#k(S^2\times S^2)$ isn't for $k=0,1,2$. For $k=0$, this follows from Donaldson's theorem, and for $k=1,2$, it was also shown by Simon Donaldson, although Donaldson's theorem itself no longer applies. (A simpler argument was later obtained with Seiberg–Witten invariants.) Hence a smooth surgery along the connecting sphere $S^3$ to remove one, two or three $S^2\times S^2$ from the smooth K3 surface $\mathrm{K3}$ must fail. (It is an open question whether this also holds for any connected sum of the K3 surface $\mathrm{K3}$, which is known as 11/8 conjecture.) In the simplest surgery of removing three $S^2\times S^2$, the failure spawns an exotic $\R^4$ in $\#3(S^2\times S^2)$.

==== Construction from a nine-fold blow-up ====
The intersection form of the smooth complex surface $\mathbb{C}P^2\#9\overline{\mathbb{C}P^2}$, the simplest example of an elliptic surface known as Dolgachev surface, is $[+1]\oplus 9[-1] \cong -E_8\oplus[+1]\oplus[-1]$ with the isomorphism coming from the Hesse–Minkowski theorem. It is therefore the same as for the topological 4-manifold $\overline{M_{E_8}}\#\mathbb{C}P^2\#*\overline{\mathbb{C}P^2}$ using the fake second complex projective space, so Freedman's classification claims both to be homeomorphic. In particular, that makes $\overline{M_{E_8}}\#\mathbb{C}P^2\#*\overline{\mathbb{C}P^2}$ smoothable. But a smooth surgery to remove $\mathbb{C}P^2$ results in the non-smoothable manifold $\overline{M_{E_8}}\#*\overline{\mathbb{C}P^2}$, which follows from its intersection form $-E_8\oplus[-1]$ being negative definite and not diagonalizable, which Donaldson's theorem forbids if it was smoothable. The failure of this smooth surgery spawns an exotic $\R^4$ in $\mathbb{C}P^2$.

==== Construction from a ten-fold blow-up ====
The previous construction can be expanded: The intersection form of the smooth complex surface $\mathbb{C}P^2\# 10\overline{\mathbb{C}P^9}$ is $[+1]\oplus 10[-1] \cong -E_8\oplus H\oplus[-1]$, the same as for the topological 4-manifold $\overline{M_{E_8}}\#(S^2\times S^2)\#*\overline{\mathbb{C}P^2}$, so Freedman's classification claims both to be homeomorphic and in particular the latter to be smoothable. But a smooth surgery to remove $S^2\times S^2$ again results in the non-smoothable manifold $\overline{M_{E_8}}\#*\overline{\mathbb{C}P^2}$. The failure of this smooth surgery spawns an exotic $\R^4$ in $S^2\times S^2$.

=== Construction from the failure of the smooth h-cobordism theorem ===
According to Michael Freedman, the four-dimensional topological h-cobordism theorem holds, while according to Simon Donaldson, the four-dimensional smooth h-cobordism theorem doesn't hold. Let $W$ be a smooth h-cobordism between smooth 4-manifolds $M$ and $N$, for which there is no diffeomorphism $W\cong M\times[0,1]$, although there must be a homeomorphism $W\cong M\times[0,1]$. In this case there exists an open sub-cobordism $U\subset W$ with a homeomorphism $U\cong D^4\times[0,1]\cong\mathbb{R}^4\times[0,1]$ and a compact contractible sub-cobordism $K\subset U$, so that $W$ and $U$ are indeed smoothly trivial cobordisms outside of $K$, hence there are diffeomorphisms:

$$W\setminus K
\cong(M\setminus K)\times[0,1];$$
$$U\setminus K
\cong(U\cap M\setminus K)\times[0,1].$$

Now $U$ connects the two open subsets $U\cap M\setminus K$ and $U\cap N\setminus K$, which are homeomorphic to $\R^4$, but cannot diffeomorphic to $\R^4$ as this would cause a diffeomorphism $W\cong M\times[0,1]$.

== Small exotic R^{4}s ==
An exotic $\R^4$ is called small if it can be smoothly embedded as an open subset of the standard $\R^4.$

Small exotic $\R^4$ can be constructed by starting with a non-trivial smooth 5-dimensional h-cobordism (which exists by Donaldson's proof that the h-cobordism theorem fails in this dimension) and using Freedman's theorem that the topological h-cobordism theorem holds in this dimension.

== Large exotic R^{4}s ==
An exotic $\R^4$ is called large if it cannot be smoothly embedded as an open subset of the standard $\R^4.$

Examples of large exotic $\R^4$ can be constructed using the fact that compact 4-manifolds can often be split as a topological sum (by Freedman's work), but cannot be split as a smooth sum (by Donaldson's work).

Michael Hartley Freedman and Laurence R. Taylor (1986) showed that there is a maximal exotic $\R^4,$ into which all other $\R^4$ can be smoothly embedded as open subsets.

== Related exotic structures ==
Casson handles are homeomorphic to $\mathbb{D}^2 \times \R^2$ by Freedman's theorem (where $\mathbb{D}^2$ is the closed unit disc) but it follows from Donaldson's theorem that they are not all diffeomorphic to $\mathbb{D}^2 \times \R^2.$ In other words, some Casson handles are exotic $\mathbb{D}^2 \times \R^2.$

It is not known (as of 2024) whether or not there are any exotic 4-spheres; such an exotic 4-sphere would be a counterexample to the smooth generalized Poincaré conjecture in dimension 4. Some plausible candidates are given by Gluck twists.

== See also ==
- Akbulut cork - tool used to construct exotic $\R^4$'s from classes in $H^3(S^3,\mathbb{R})$
- Atlas (topology)
