= Differential topology =

Branch of mathematics

In mathematics, differential topology is the field dealing with the topological properties and smooth properties (Note: A smooth property of a manifold is any property preserved up to diffeomorphism. This does not include certain geometric properties such as distances between points or volume, which depend on a further choice of Riemannian metric and are only invariant up to isometry.) of smooth manifolds. In this sense differential topology is distinct from the closely related field of differential geometry, which concerns the geometric properties of smooth manifolds, including notions of size, distance, and rigid shape. By comparison differential topology is concerned with coarser properties, such as the number of holes in a manifold, its homotopy type, or the structure of its diffeomorphism group. Because many of these coarser properties may be captured algebraically, differential topology has strong links to algebraic topology.

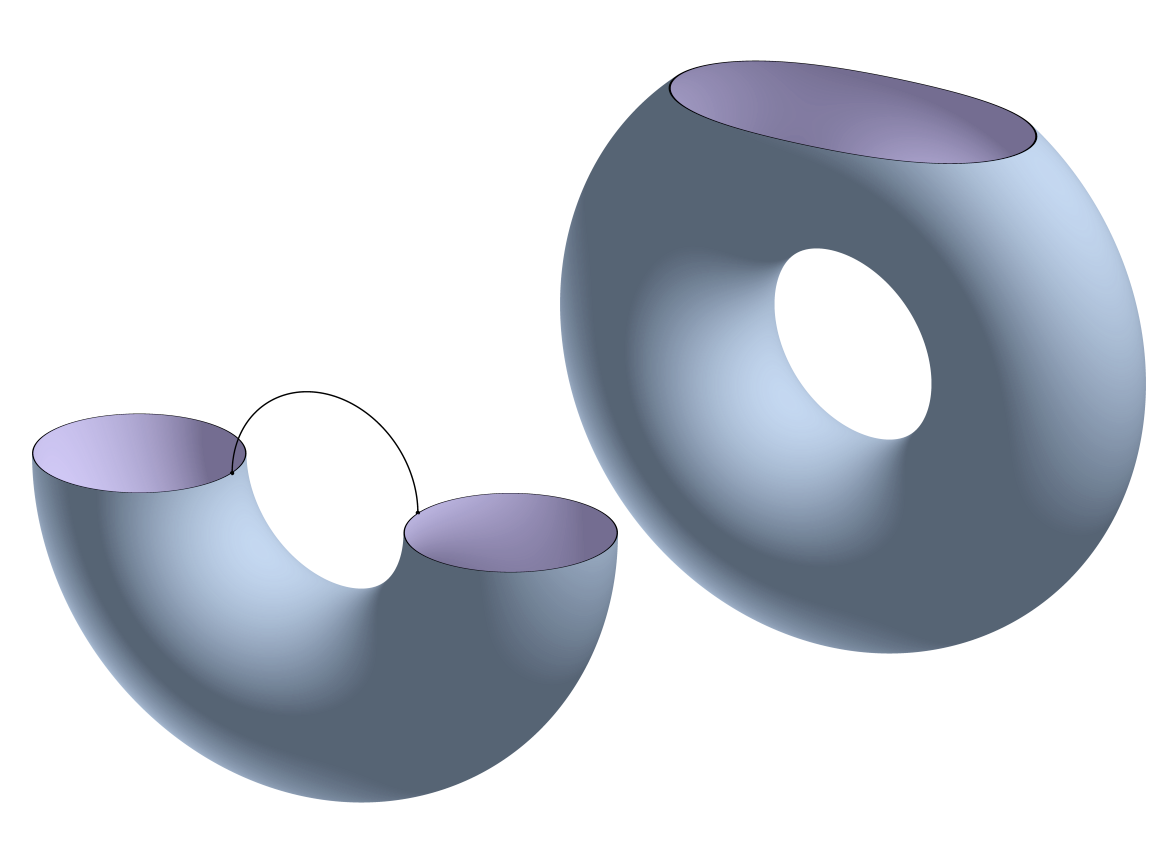
The Morse theory of the height function on a torus can describe its homotopy type.

The central goal of the field of differential topology is the classification of all smooth manifolds up to diffeomorphism. Since dimension is an invariant of smooth manifolds up to diffeomorphism type, this classification is often studied by classifying the (connected) manifolds in each dimension separately:

- In dimension 1, the only smooth manifolds up to diffeomorphism are the circle, the real number line, and allowing a boundary, the half-closed interval $[0,1)$ and fully closed interval $[0,1]$.
- In dimension 2, every closed surface is classified up to diffeomorphism by its genus, the number of holes (or equivalently its Euler characteristic), and whether or not it is orientable. This is the famous classification of closed surfaces. Already in dimension two the classification of non-compact surfaces becomes difficult, due to the existence of exotic spaces such as Jacob's ladder.
- In dimension 3, William Thurston's geometrization conjecture, proven by Grigori Perelman, gives a partial classification of compact three-manifolds. Included in this theorem is the Poincaré conjecture, which states that any closed, simply connected three-manifold is homeomorphic (and in fact diffeomorphic) to the 3-sphere.

A cobordism (W; M, N), which generalises the notion of a diffeomorphism.

Beginning in dimension 4, the classification becomes much more difficult for two reasons. Firstly, every finitely presented group appears as the fundamental group of some 4-manifold, and since the fundamental group is a diffeomorphism invariant, this makes the classification of 4-manifolds at least as difficult as the classification of finitely presented groups. By the word problem for groups, which is equivalent to the halting problem, it is impossible to classify such groups, so a full topological classification is impossible. Secondly, beginning in dimension four it is possible to have smooth manifolds that are homeomorphic, but with distinct, non-diffeomorphic smooth structures. This is true even for the Euclidean space $\mathbb{R}^4$, which admits many exotic $\mathbb{R}^4$ structures. This means that the study of differential topology in dimensions 4 and higher must use tools genuinely outside the realm of the regular continuous topology of topological manifolds. One of the central open problems in differential topology is the four-dimensional smooth Poincaré conjecture, which asks if every smooth 4-manifold that is homeomorphic to the 4-sphere, is also diffeomorphic to it. That is, does the 4-sphere admit only one smooth structure? This conjecture is true in dimensions 1, 2, and 3, by the above classification results, but is known to be false in dimension 7 due to the Milnor spheres.

Important tools in studying the differential topology of smooth manifolds include the construction of smooth topological invariants of such manifolds, such as de Rham cohomology or the intersection form, as well as smoothable topological constructions, such as smooth surgery theory or the construction of cobordisms. Morse theory is an important tool which studies smooth manifolds by considering the critical points of differentiable functions on the manifold, demonstrating how the smooth structure of the manifold enters into the set of tools available. Oftentimes more geometric or analytical techniques may be used, by equipping a smooth manifold with a Riemannian metric or by studying a differential equation on it. Care must be taken to ensure that the resulting information is insensitive to this choice of extra structure, and so genuinely reflects only the topological properties of the underlying smooth manifold. For example, the Hodge theorem provides a geometric and analytical interpretation of the de Rham cohomology, and gauge theory was used by Simon Donaldson to prove facts about the intersection form of simply connected 4-manifolds. In some cases techniques from contemporary physics may appear, such as topological quantum field theory, which can be used to compute topological invariants of smooth spaces.

Famous theorems in differential topology include the Whitney embedding theorem, the hairy ball theorem, the Hopf theorem, the Poincaré–Hopf theorem, Donaldson's theorem, and the Poincaré conjecture.

== Description ==
Differential topology considers the properties and structures that require only a smooth structure on a manifold to be defined. Smooth manifolds are 'softer' than manifolds with extra geometric structures, which can act as obstructions to certain types of equivalences and deformations that exist in differential topology. For instance, volume and Riemannian curvature are invariants that can distinguish different geometric structures on the same smooth manifold—that is, one can smoothly "flatten out" certain manifolds, but it might require distorting the space and affecting the curvature or volume.

On the other hand, smooth manifolds are more rigid than the topological manifolds. John Milnor discovered that some spheres have more than one smooth structure—see Exotic sphere and Donaldson's theorem. Michel Kervaire exhibited topological manifolds with no smooth structure at all. Some constructions of smooth manifold theory, such as the existence of tangent bundles, can be done in the topological setting with much more work, and others cannot.

One of the main topics in differential topology is the study of special kinds of smooth mappings between manifolds, namely immersions and submersions, and the intersections of submanifolds via transversality. More generally one is interested in properties and invariants of smooth manifolds that are carried over by diffeomorphisms, another special kind of smooth mapping. Morse theory is another branch of differential topology, in which topological information about a manifold is deduced from changes in the rank of the Jacobian of a function.

For a list of differential topology topics, see the following reference: List of differential geometry topics.

== Differential topology versus differential geometry ==
Differential topology and differential geometry are first characterized by their similarity. They both study primarily the properties of differentiable manifolds, sometimes with a variety of structures imposed on them.

Animation of a coffee cup transforming into a donut shape

One major difference lies in the nature of the problems that each subject tries to address. In one view, differential topology distinguishes itself from differential geometry by studying primarily those problems that are inherently global. Consider the example of a coffee cup and a donut. From the point of view of differential topology, the donut and the coffee cup are the same (in a sense). This is an inherently global view, though, because there is no way for the differential topologist to tell whether the two objects are the same (in this sense) by looking at just a tiny (local) piece of either of them. They must have access to each entire (global) object.

From the point of view of differential geometry, the coffee cup and the donut are different because it is impossible to rotate the coffee cup in such a way that its configuration matches that of the donut. This is also a global way of thinking about the problem. But an important distinction is that the geometer does not need the entire object to decide this. By looking, for instance, at just a tiny piece of the handle, they can decide that the coffee cup is different from the donut because the handle is thinner (or more curved) than any piece of the donut.

To put it succinctly, differential topology studies structures on manifolds that, in a sense, have no interesting local structure. Differential geometry studies structures on manifolds that do have an interesting local (or sometimes even infinitesimal) structure.

More mathematically, for example, the problem of constructing a diffeomorphism between two manifolds of the same dimension is inherently global since locally two such manifolds are always diffeomorphic. Likewise, the problem of computing a quantity on a manifold that is invariant under differentiable mappings is inherently global, since any local invariant will be trivial in the sense that it is already exhibited in the topology of $\R^n$. Moreover, differential topology does not restrict itself necessarily to the study of diffeomorphism. For example, symplectic topology—a subbranch of differential topology—studies global properties of symplectic manifolds. Differential geometry concerns itself with problems—which may be local or global—that always have some non-trivial local properties. Thus differential geometry may study differentiable manifolds equipped with a connection, a metric (which may be Riemannian, pseudo-Riemannian, or Finsler), a special sort of distribution (such as a CR structure), and so on.

This distinction between differential geometry and differential topology is blurred, however, in questions specifically pertaining to local diffeomorphism invariants such as the tangent space at a point. Differential topology also deals with questions like these, which specifically pertain to the properties of differentiable mappings on $\R^n$ (for example the tangent bundle, jet bundles, the Whitney extension theorem, and so forth).

The distinction is concise in abstract terms:

- Differential topology is the study of the (infinitesimal, local, and global) properties of structures on manifolds that have only trivial local moduli.
- Differential geometry is such a study of structures on manifolds that have one or more non-trivial local moduli.

== See also ==
- List of differential geometry topics
- Glossary of differential geometry and topology
- Important publications in differential geometry
- Important publications in differential topology
- Basic introduction to the mathematics of curved spacetime
