= Differential structure =

Mathematical structure

In mathematics, an n-dimensional differential structure (or differentiable structure) on a set M makes M into an n-dimensional differential manifold, which is a topological manifold with some additional mathematical structure that allows for differential calculus on the manifold. If M is already a topological manifold, it is required that the new topology be identical to the existing one.

== Definition ==
For a natural number n and some k which may be a non-negative integer or infinity, an n-dimensional C^{k} differential structure is defined using a C^{k}-atlas, which is a set of homeomorphisms called charts between open subsets of M (whose union is the whole of M) and open subsets of $\mathbb{R}^{n}$:

$$\varphi_{i}:M\supset W_{i}\rightarrow U_{i}\subset\mathbb{R}^{n}$$

which are C^{k}-compatible (in the sense defined below):

Each chart allows an open subset of the manifold to be viewed as an open subset of $\mathbb{R}^{n}$, but the usefulness of this depends on how much the charts agree when their domains overlap.

Consider two charts:

$$\varphi_{i}:W_{i}\rightarrow U_{i},$$
$$\varphi_{j}:W_{j}\rightarrow U_{j}.$$

The intersection of their domains is

$$W_{ij}=W_{i}\cap W_{j}$$

whose images under the two charts are

$$U_{ij}=\varphi_{i}\left(W_{ij}\right),$$
$$U_{ji}=\varphi_{j}\left(W_{ij}\right).$$

The transition map between the two charts translates between their images on their shared domain:

$$\varphi_{ij}:U_{ij}\rightarrow U_{ji}$$
$$\varphi_{ij}(x)=\varphi_{j}\left(\varphi_{i}^{-1}\left(x\right)\right).$$

Two charts $\varphi_{i},\,\varphi_{j}$ are C^{k}-compatible if

$$U_{ij},\, U_{ji}$$

are open, and the transition maps

$$\varphi_{ij},\,\varphi_{ji}$$

have continuous partial derivatives of order k. If k = 0, we only require that the transition maps are continuous, consequently a C^{0}-atlas is simply another way to define a topological manifold. If k = ∞, derivatives of all orders must be continuous. A family of C^{k}-compatible charts covering the whole manifold is a C^{k}-atlas defining a C^{k} differential manifold. Two atlases are C^{k}-equivalent if the union of their sets of charts forms a C^{k}-atlas. In particular, a C^{k}-atlas that is C^{0}-compatible with a C^{0}-atlas that defines a topological manifold is said to determine a C^{k} differential structure on the topological manifold. The C^{k} equivalence classes of such atlases are the distinct C^{k} differential structures of the manifold. Each distinct differential structure is determined by a unique maximal atlas, which is simply the union of all atlases in the equivalence class.

For simplification of language, without any loss of precision, one might just call a maximal C^{k}−atlas on a given set a C^{k}−manifold. This maximal atlas then uniquely determines both the topology and the underlying set, the latter being the union of the domains of all charts, and the former having the set of all these domains as a basis.

== Existence and uniqueness theorems ==
For any integer k > 0 and any n−dimensional C^{k}−manifold, the maximal atlas contains a C^{∞}−atlas on the same underlying set by a theorem due to Hassler Whitney. It has also been shown that any maximal C^{k}−atlas contains some number of distinct maximal C^{∞}−atlases whenever n > 0, although for any pair of these distinct C^{∞}−atlases there exists a C^{∞}−diffeomorphism identifying the two. It follows that there is only one class of smooth structures (modulo pairwise smooth diffeomorphism) over any topological manifold which admits a differentiable structure, i.e. The C^{∞}−, structures in a C^{k}−manifold. A bit loosely, one might express this by saying that the smooth structure is (essentially) unique. The case for k = 0 is different. Namely, there exist topological manifolds which admit no C^{1}−structure, a result proved by Kervaire (1960), and later explained in the context of Donaldson's theorem (compare Hilbert's fifth problem).

Smooth structures on an orientable manifold are usually counted modulo orientation-preserving smooth homeomorphisms. There then arises the question whether orientation-reversing diffeomorphisms exist. There is an "essentially unique" smooth structure for any topological manifold of dimension smaller than 4. For compact manifolds of dimension greater than 4, there is a finite number of "smooth types", i.e. equivalence classes of pairwise smoothly diffeomorphic smooth structures. In the case of R^{n} with n ≠ 4, the number of these types is one, whereas for n = 4, there are uncountably many such types. One refers to these by exotic R^{4}.

== Differential structures on spheres of dimension 1 to 20 ==
The following table lists the number of smooth types of the topological m−sphere S^{m} for the values of the dimension m from 1 up to 20. Spheres with a smooth, i.e. C^{∞}−differential structure not smoothly diffeomorphic to the usual one are known as exotic spheres.

Dimension	1	2	3	4	5	6	7	8	9	10	11	12	13	14	15	16	17	18	19	20
Smooth types	1	1	1	≥1	1	1	28	2	8	6	992	1	3	2	16256	2	16	16	523264	24

It is not currently known how many smooth types the topological 4-sphere S^{4} has, except that there is at least one. There may be one, a finite number, or an infinite number. The claim that there is just one is known as the smooth Poincaré conjecture (see Generalized Poincaré conjecture). Most mathematicians believe that this conjecture is false, i.e. that S^{4} has more than one smooth type. The problem is connected with the existence of more than one smooth type of the topological 4-disk (or 4-ball).

== Differential structures on topological manifolds ==
As mentioned above, in dimensions smaller than 4, there is only one differential structure for each topological manifold. That was proved by Tibor Radó for dimension 1 and 2, and by Edwin E. Moise in dimension 3. By using obstruction theory, Robion Kirby and Laurent C. Siebenmann were able to show that the number of PL structures for compact topological manifolds of dimension greater than 4 is finite. John Milnor, Michel Kervaire, and Morris Hirsch proved that the number of smooth structures on a compact PL manifold is finite and agrees with the number of differential structures on the sphere for the same dimension (see the book Asselmeyer-Maluga, Brans chapter 7). By combining these results, the number of smooth structures on a compact topological manifold of dimension not equal to 4 is finite.

Dimension 4 is more complicated. For compact manifolds, results depend on the complexity of the manifold as measured by the second Betti number b_{2}. For large Betti numbers b_{2} > 18 in a simply connected 4-manifold, one can use a surgery along a knot or link to produce a new differential structure. With the help of this procedure one can produce countably infinite many differential structures. But even for simple spaces such as $S^4, {\mathbb C}P^2,...$ one doesn't know the construction of other differential structures. For non-compact 4-manifolds there are many examples like ${\mathbb R}^4,S^3\times {\mathbb R},M^4\smallsetminus\{*\},...$ having uncountably many differential structures.

== See also ==
- Mathematical structure
- Exotic R^{4}
- Exotic sphere
