= Moise's theorem =

Any topological 3-manifold has unique PL and smooth structures

In mathematics, specifically geometric topology, Moise's theorem states that any topological 3-manifold has an essentially unique piecewise-linear structure and smooth structure. It was proved by Edwin E. Moise.

The analogue of Moise's theorem in dimension 4 (and above) is false: there are topological 4-manifolds with no piecewise linear structures like the E8 manifold, and others with an infinite number of inequivalent ones. However, a restricted version holds with non-compactness, which is known as the Quinn theorem.

== See also ==
- Exotic sphere
