= Hauptvermutung =

Refuted conjecture of geometric topology

The Hauptvermutung (Note: German for main conjecture. It is an abbreviation for die Hauptvermutung der kombinatorischen Topologie, which translates as the main conjecture of combinatorial topology.) of geometric topology is a now refuted conjecture asking whether any two triangulations of a triangulable space have subdivisions that are combinatorially equivalent, i.e. the subdivided triangulations are built up in the same combinatorial pattern. It was originally formulated as a conjecture in 1908 by Ernst Steinitz and Heinrich Franz Friedrich Tietze, but it is now known to be false.

== History ==
The non-manifold version was disproved by John Milnor in 1961 using Reidemeister torsion.

The manifold version is true in dimensions $m\le 3$. The cases $m = 2$ and $3$ were proved by Tibor Radó and Edwin E. Moise in the 1920s and 1950s, respectively.

An obstruction to the manifold version was formulated by Andrew Casson and Dennis Sullivan in 1967–69 (originally in the simply-connected case), using the Rochlin invariant and the cohomology group $H^3(M;\mathbb{Z}/2\mathbb{Z})$.

In dimension $m \ge 5$, a homeomorphism $f \colon N \to M$ of m-dimensional piecewise linear manifolds has an invariant $\kappa(f) \in H^3(M;\Z/2\Z)$ such that $f$ is isotopic to a piecewise linear (PL) homeomorphism if and only if $\kappa(f) = 0$. In the simply-connected case and with $m \ge 5$, $f$ is homotopic to a PL homeomorphism if and only if $[\kappa(f)] = 0 \in [M,G/{\rm PL}]$.

This quantity $\kappa(f)$ is now seen as a relative version of the triangulation obstruction of Robion Kirby and Laurent C. Siebenmann, obtained in 1970. The Kirby–Siebenmann obstruction is defined for any compact m-dimensional topological manifold M

$$\kappa(M)\in H^4(M;\Z/2\Z)$$

again using the Rochlin invariant. For $m\ge 5$, the manifold M has a PL structure (i.e., it can be triangulated by a PL manifold) if and only if $\kappa(M) = 0$, and if this obstruction is 0, the PL structures are parametrized by $H^3(M;\Z/2\Z)$. In particular there are only a finite number of essentially distinct PL structures on M.

For compact simply-connected manifolds of dimension 4, Simon Donaldson found examples with an infinite number of inequivalent PL structures, and Michael Freedman found the E8 manifold which not only has no PL structure, but (by work of Casson) is not even homeomorphic to a simplicial complex.

In 2013, Ciprian Manolescu proved that there exist compact topological manifolds of dimension 5 (and hence of any dimension greater than 5) that are not homeomorphic to a simplicial complex. Thus Casson's example illustrates a more general phenomenon that is not merely limited to dimension 4.
