= Dolgachev surface =

In mathematics, Dolgachev surfaces are certain simply connected elliptic surfaces, introduced by Igor Dolgachev (1981). They can be used to give examples of an infinite family of homeomorphic simply connected compact 4-manifolds, no two of which are diffeomorphic.

== Properties ==
The blowup $X_0$ of the projective plane in 9 points can be realized as an elliptic fibration all of whose fibers are irreducible. A Dolgachev surface $X_q$ is given by applying logarithmic transformations of orders 2 and q to two smooth fibers for some $q\ge 3$.

The Dolgachev surfaces are simply connected, and the bilinear form on the second cohomology group is odd of signature $(1,9)$ (so it is the unimodular lattice $I_{1,9}$). The geometric genus $p_g$ is 0 and the Kodaira dimension is 1.

Simon Donaldson (1987) found the first examples of simply-connected homeomorphic but not diffeomorphic 4-manifolds $X_0$ and $X_3$. More generally the surfaces $X_q$ and $X_r$ are always homeomorphic, but are not diffeomorphic unless $q=r$.

Selman Akbulut (2012) showed that the Dolgachev surface $X_3$ has a handlebody decomposition without 1- and 3-handles.

== Detection of exotic smooth structures ==
According to Freedman's classification, a simply connected oriented closed topological 4-manifold with intersection form $[+1]\oplus 9[-1]$ is homeomorphic to $\mathbb{C}P^2\# 9\overline{\mathbb{C}P^2}$. Any such smooth manifold with a non-vanishing Seiberg–Witten invariant has an exotic smooth structure since $\mathbb{C}P^2\# 9\overline{\mathbb{C}P^2}$ with the induced smooth structure allows a Riemannian metric of positive scalar curvature (psc metric) and therefore has only vanishing Seiberg–Witten invariants.
