= Freedman classification =

In topology in mathematics, Freedman's classification (or Freedman's theorem) is a central result about four-dimensional topological manifolds (short 4-manifolds). Concretely, it gives a full classification of all simply connected oriented closed topological 4-manifolds up to orientation-preserving homeomorphism by their intersection form and their Kirby–Siebenmann invariant. Freedman's classification is named after Michael Freedman, who published it in 1982 and who was awarded the Fields Medal for it in 1986.

== Claim ==
Every symmetric unimodular bilinear form is the intersection form of a simply connected oriented closed topological 4-manifold.

- If the form is even (has only even entries on the diagonal), then there exists exactly one such manifold up to orientation-preserving homeomorphism.
- If the form is odd (has at least one odd entry on the diagonal), then there exist exactly two such manifolds up to orientation-preserving homeomorphism with different binary Kirby–Siebenmann invariant. Hence at most one of them is smoothable ($\operatorname{ks}=0$ is unrelated and $\operatorname{ks}=1$ forbids smoothability).

== Implications ==
Direct consequences of just the existence are that of the E8 manifold $M_{E_8}$ and the fake second complex projective space $*\mathbb{C}P^2$. Direct consequences of just the uniqueness are:

- Two simply connected oriented closed topological 4-manifolds with isomorphic even intersection forms are orientation-preserving homeomorphic.
- Two simply connected oriented closed topological 4-manifold with isomorphic odd intersection forms and identical Kirby–Siebenmann invariants are orientation-preserving homeomorphic. In particular, if both are smoothable (implying $\operatorname{ks}=0$), then both are orientation-preserving homeomorphic.

Connected sum of manifolds

Direct consequences of both is:

- If the intersection form of a simply connected oriented closed topological 4-manifold $M$ splits as a direct sum $Q_M=Q_1\oplus Q_2$, then there exist simply connected oriented closed topological 4-manifolds $N_1$ and $N_2$ with respective intersection forms $Q_1$ and $Q_2$, so that there is an orientation-preserving homeomorphis $M\cong N_1\# N_2$ with their connected sum. (Alternatively $M\cong*N_1\#*N_2$.)
- For every simply connected oriented closed topological 4-manifold $M$ there exists an orientation-preserving homeomorphism:
  $$M\#\mathbb{C}P^2\#\overline{\mathbb{C}P^2}
\cong\left(b_2^+(M)+1\right)\mathbb{C}P^2\#\left(b_2^-(M)+1\right)\overline{\mathbb{C}P^2}.$$

This follows from using Serre's classification for the intersection forms. Connected sums with $\mathbb{C}P^2$ and $\overline{\mathbb{C}P^2}$ make the intersection form odd and a connected sum with $\mathbb{C}P^2\#\overline{\mathbb{C}P^2}$ makes it odd and indefinite.

== Examples ==
Although the intersection forms of $S^2\times S^2 \cong\mathbb{C}P^1\times\mathbb{C}P^1$ and $\mathbb{C}P^2\#\overline{\mathbb{C}P^2}$ have same rank $2$ and signature $0$, the former is even (having only even numbers on its diagonal) and the latter is odd (not even):

$$Q_{S^2\times S^2}
=\begin{bmatrix}
0 & 1 \\
1 & 0
\end{bmatrix};$$
$$Q_{\mathbb{C}P^2\#\overline{\mathbb{C}P^2}}
=\begin{bmatrix}
1 & 0 \\
0 & -1
\end{bmatrix}.$$

Hence the intersection forms are not isomorphic and there cannot be a homeomorphism $S^2\times S^2 \not\cong\mathbb{C}P^2\#\overline{\mathbb{C}P^2}$. But if a connected sum with $\mathbb{C}P^2$ or $\overline{\mathbb{C}P^2}$ is used to add $Q_{\mathbb{C}P^2}=[+1]$ or $Q_{\overline{\mathbb{C}P^2}}=[-1]$ to the diagonal, making any form odd, then Serre's classification can be applied and be translated into orientation-preserving homeomorphisms with Freedman's classification:

$$\begin{bmatrix}
0 & 1 \\
1 & 0
\end{bmatrix}\oplus[-1]
\cong[+1]\oplus 2[-1]
\Rightarrow
\left(S^2\times S^2\right)\#\overline{\mathbb{C}P^2}
\cong\mathbb{C}P^2\# 2\overline{\mathbb{C}P^2};$$
$$\begin{bmatrix}
0 & 1 \\
1 & 0
\end{bmatrix}\oplus[+1]
\cong 2[+1]\oplus[-1]
\Rightarrow
\left(S^2\times S^2\right)\#\mathbb{C}P^2
\cong 2\mathbb{C}P^2\#\overline{\mathbb{C}P^2}.$$

It can be shown that these homeomorphisms are even diffeomorphisms.

With a similar strategy, a definite form like the E8 form $E_8$ can be made indefinite, so that Serre's classification can be applied again. Since the E8 manifold $M_{E_8}$ with intersection form $E_8$ isn't smoothable and even has Kirby–Siebenmann invariant $\operatorname{ks}(M_{E_8})=1$, a translation into homeomorphisms using Freedman's classification requires using the fake second complex projective space $*\mathbb{C}P^2$ with equal Kirby–Siebenmann invariant $\operatorname{ks}(*\mathbb{C}P^2)=1$ to compensate:

$E_8\oplus[-1] \cong 8[+1]\oplus[-1] \Rightarrow M_{E_8}\# *\overline{\mathbb{C}P^2} \cong 8\mathbb{C}P^2\#\overline{\mathbb{C}P^2};$$-E_8\oplus[+1] \cong[+1]\oplus 8[-1] \Rightarrow \overline{M_{E_8}}\# *\mathbb{C}P^2 \cong\mathbb{C}P^2\# 8\overline{\mathbb{C}P^2}.$

Alternatively, the E8 manifold $M_{E_8}$ can also compensate itself when reversing its orientation:

$$E_8\oplus -E_8
\cong 8\begin{bmatrix}
0 & 1 \\
1 & 0
\end{bmatrix}
\Rightarrow
M_{E_8}\#\overline{M_{E_8}}
\cong\#8(S^2\times S^2).$$

== Connection to the topological Poincaré conjecture ==
Ironically, the simplest case of Freedman's classification, which is the empty form, which is trivially smmyetric, unimodular, bilinear and even, leads to the hard problem of the topological Poincaré conjecture in four dimensions. It conjectures that every closed topological 4-manifold, which is homotopy equivalent to the 4-sphere, is even homeomorphic to the 4-sphere. Homotopy equivalence transfers the required properties, hence the closed topological 4-manifold is also simply connected, oriented and has empty intersection form. Hence the Poincaré conjecture follows directly from Freedman's classification.

== Connection to Donaldson's theorem ==
Freedman's classification can be combined with Donaldson's theorem (also awarded with a Fields Medal in 1986), which restricts both: Freedman's classification requires simple connectedness and Donaldson's theorem requires smoothness, which both isn't required for the other result. (Simple connectedness was initially required in the original publication of Donaldson's theorem in 1983, but was improved to work without in 1987.)

Corollary from Donaldson–Freedman: A simply connected oriented closed smooth 4-manifold $M$ with definite intersection form is orientation-preserving homeomorphic to $\# b_2^+(M)\mathbb{C}P^2$ if it's positive definite and $\# b_2^-(M)\overline{\mathbb{C}P^2}$ if it's negative definite.

Proof: According to Donaldson's theorem, the intersection form is diagonal, hence isomorphic to $\oplus b_2^+(M)[+1]$ if positive definite and $\oplus b_2^-(M)[-1]$ if negative definite. According to Freedman's classification, its orientation-preserving homeomorphic to a simply connected oriented closed smooth 4-manifold of identical intersection form, hence $\# b_2^+(M)\mathbb{C}P^2$ if positive definite and $\# b_2^-(M)\overline{\mathbb{C}P^2}$ if negative definite.

== Literature ==
- Freedman, Michael (1982). "The topology of four-dimensional manifolds". Journal of Differential Geometry. 17 (3): 357–453. doi:10.4310/jdg/1214437136. ISSN 0022-040X. MR 0679066.
- Freed, Daniel; Uhlenbeck, Karen (1991). Instantons and Four-Manifolds. Mathematical Sciences Research Institute Publications. Vol. 1. Cambridge University Press. ISBN 978-1-4613-9705-2.
- Gompf, Robert E.; Stipcisz, András I. (1999). 4-Manifolds and Kirby Calculus. Graduate Studies in Mathematics. Vol. 20. doi:10.1090/gsm/020. ISBN 978-1-4704-7455-3.
- Scorpan, Alexandru (2005). The Wild World of 4-Manifolds. Mathematical Sciences Research Institute Publications. Vol. 1. American Mathematical Society. ISBN 978-1-4704-6861-3.
