= Exotic sphere =

Smooth manifold that is homeomorphic but not diffeomorphic to a sphere

In an area of mathematics called differential topology, an exotic sphere is a differentiable manifold M that is homeomorphic but not diffeomorphic to the standard Euclidean n-sphere. That is, M is a sphere from the point of view of all its topological properties, but carrying a smooth structure that is not the familiar one (hence the name "exotic").

The first exotic spheres were constructed by John Milnor (1956) in dimension $n = 7$ as $S^3$-bundles over $S^4$. He showed that there are at least 7 differentiable structures on the 7-sphere. In any dimension Milnor (1959) showed that the diffeomorphism classes of oriented exotic spheres form the non-trivial elements of an abelian monoid under connected sum, which is a finite abelian group if the dimension is not 4. The classification of exotic spheres by Michel Kervaire and Milnor (1963) showed that the oriented exotic 7-spheres are the non-trivial elements of a cyclic group of order 28 under the operation of connected sum. These groups are known as Kervaire–Milnor groups.

More generally, in any dimension n ≠ 4, there is a finite Abelian group whose elements are the equivalence classes of smooth structures on S^{n}, where two structures are considered equivalent if there is an orientation preserving diffeomorphism carrying one structure onto the other. The group operation is defined by [x] + [y] = [x + y], where x and y are arbitrary representatives of their equivalence classes, and x + y denotes the smooth structure on the smooth S^{n} that is the connected sum of x and y. It is necessary to show that such a definition does not depend on the choices made; indeed this can be shown.

== Introduction ==
The unit n-sphere, $S^n$, is the set of all (n+1)-tuples $(x_1, x_2, \ldots , x_{n+1})$ of real numbers, such that the sum $x_1^2 + x_2^2 + \cdots + x_{n+1}^2 = 1$. For instance, $S^1$ is a circle, while $S^2$ is the surface of an ordinary ball of radius one in 3 dimensions. Topologists consider a space X to be an n-sphere if there is a homeomorphism between them, i.e. every point in X may be assigned to exactly one point in the unit n-sphere by a continuous bijection with continuous inverse. For example, a point x on an n-sphere of radius r can be matched homeomorphically with a point on the unit n-sphere by multiplying its distance from the origin by $1/r$. Similarly, an n-cube of any radius is homeomorphic to an n-sphere.

In differential topology, two smooth manifolds are considered smoothly equivalent if there exists a diffeomorphism from one to the other, which is a homeomorphism between them, with the additional condition that it be smooth — that is, it should have derivatives of all orders at all its points — and its inverse homeomorphism must also be smooth. To calculate derivatives, one needs to have local coordinate systems defined consistently in X. Mathematicians (including Milnor himself) were surprised in 1956 when Milnor showed that consistent local coordinate systems could be set up on the 7-sphere in two different ways that were equivalent in the continuous sense, but not in the differentiable sense. Milnor and others set about trying to discover how many such exotic spheres could exist in each dimension and to understand how they relate to each other. No exotic structures are possible on the 1-, 2-, 3-, 5-, 6-, 12-, 56- or 61-sphere. Some higher-dimensional spheres have only two possible differentiable structures, others have thousands. Whether exotic 4-spheres exist, and if so how many, is an unsolved problem.

== Classification ==
The monoid of smooth structures on n-spheres is the collection of oriented smooth n-manifolds which are homeomorphic to the n-sphere, taken up to orientation-preserving diffeomorphism. The monoid operation is the connected sum. Provided $n\ne 4$, this monoid is a group and is isomorphic to the group $\Theta_n$ of h-cobordism classes of oriented homotopy n-spheres, which is finite and abelian. In dimension 4 almost nothing is known about the monoid of smooth spheres, beyond the facts that it is finite or countably infinite, and abelian, though it is suspected to be infinite; see the section on Gluck twists. All homotopy n-spheres are homeomorphic to the n-sphere by the generalized Poincaré conjecture, proved by Stephen Smale in dimensions bigger than 4, Michael Freedman in dimension 4, and Grigori Perelman in dimension 3. In dimension 3, Edwin E. Moise proved that every topological manifold has an essentially unique smooth structure (see Moise's theorem), so the monoid of smooth structures on the 3-sphere is trivial.

=== Parallelizable manifolds ===
The group $\Theta_n$ has a cyclic subgroup

$$bP_{n+1}$$

represented by n-spheres that bound parallelizable manifolds. The structures of $bP_{n+1}$ and the quotient

$$\Theta_n/bP_{n+1}$$

are described separately in the paper (Kervaire & Milnor 1963), which was influential in the development of surgery theory. In fact, these calculations can be formulated in a modern language in terms of the surgery exact sequence as indicated here.

The group $bP_{n+1}$ is a cyclic group, and is trivial or order 2 except in case $n = 4k+3$, in which case it can be large, with its order related to the Bernoulli numbers. It is trivial if n is even. If n is 1 mod 4 it has order 1 or 2; in particular it has order 1 if n is 1, 5, 13, 29, or 61, and William Browder (1969) proved that it has order 2 if $n = 1$ mod 4 is not of the form $2^k - 3$. It follows from the now almost completely resolved Kervaire invariant problem that it has order 2 for all n bigger than 126; the case $n = 126$ is still open. The order of $bP_{4k}$ for $k\ge 2$ is

$$2^{2k-2}(2^{2k-1}-1)B,$$

where B is the numerator of $4B_{2k}/k$, and $B_{2k}$ is a Bernoulli number. (The formula in the topological literature differs slightly because topologists use a different convention for naming Bernoulli numbers; this article uses the number theorists' convention.)

=== Map between quotients ===
The quotient group $\Theta_n/bP_{n+1}$ has a description in terms of stable homotopy groups of spheres modulo the image of the J-homomorphism; it is either equal to the quotient or index 2. More precisely there is an injective map

$$\Theta_n/bP_{n+1}\to \pi_n^S/J,$$

where $\pi_n^S$ is the nth stable homotopy group of spheres, and J is the image of the J-homomorphism. As with $bP_{n+1}$, the image of J is a cyclic group, and is trivial or order 2 except in case $n = 4k+3$, in which case it can be large, with its order related to the Bernoulli numbers. The quotient group $\pi_n^S/J$ is the "hard" part of the stable homotopy groups of spheres, and accordingly $\Theta_n/bP_{n+1}$ is the hard part of the exotic spheres, but almost completely reduces to computing homotopy groups of spheres. The map is either an isomorphism (the image is the whole group), or an injective map with index 2. The latter is the case if and only if there exists an n-dimensional framed manifold with Kervaire invariant 1, which is known as the Kervaire invariant problem. Thus a factor of 2 in the classification of exotic spheres depends on the Kervaire invariant problem.

The Kervaire invariant problem is almost completely solved, with only the case $n=126$ remaining open, although Zhouli Xu (in collaboration with Weinan Lin and Guozhen Wang) announced during a seminar at Princeton University, on May 30, 2024, that the final case of dimension 126 has been settled and that there exist manifolds of Kervaire invariant 1 in dimension 126. Previous work of Browder (1969) proved that such manifolds only existed in dimension $n=2^j-2$, and Hill, Hopkins & Ravenel (2016) proved that there were no such manifolds for dimension $254=2^8-2$ and above. Manifolds with Kervaire invariant 1 have been constructed in dimension 2, 6, 14, 30. While it is known that there are manifolds of Kervaire invariant 1 in dimension 62, no such manifold has yet been constructed. Similarly for dimension 126.

=== Order of Θ_{n} ===
The order of the group $\Theta_n$ is given in this table (sequence A001676 in the OEIS) from (Kervaire & Milnor 1963) (except that the entry for $n = 19$ is wrong by a factor of 2 in their paper; see the correction in volume III p. 97 of Milnor's collected works).

Dim n	1	2	3	4	5	6	7	8	9	10	11	12	13	14	15	16	17	18	19	20
order $\Theta_n$	1	1	1	1	1	1	28	2	8	6	992	1	3	2	16256	2	16	16	523264	24
$bP_{n+1}$	1	1	1	1	1	1	28	1	2	1	992	1	1	1	8128	1	2	1	261632	1
$\Theta_n/bP_{n+1}$	1	1	1	1	1	1	1	2	2×2	6	1	1	3	2	2	2	2×2×2	8×2	2	24
$\pi_n^S/J$	1	2	1	1	1	2	1	2	2×2	6	1	1	3	2×2	2	2	2×2×2	8×2	2	24
index	–	2	–	–	–	2	–	–	–	–	–	–	–	2	–	–	–	–	–	–

Note that for dim $n = 4k - 1$, then $\theta_n$ are $28 = 2^2(2^3-1)$, $992 = 2^5(2^5 - 1)$, $16256 = 2^7(2^7 - 1)$, and $523264 = 2^{10}(2^9 - 1)$. Further entries in this table can be computed from the information above together with the table of stable homotopy groups of spheres.

By computations of stable homotopy groups of spheres, Wang & Xu (2017) proves that the sphere S^{61} has a unique smooth structure, and that it is the last odd-dimensional sphere with this property – the only ones are S^{1}, S^{3}, S^{5}, and S^{61}.

== Explicit examples of exotic spheres ==
When I came upon such an example in the mid-50s, I was very puzzled and didn't know what to make of it. At first, I thought I'd found a counterexample to the generalized Poincaré conjecture in dimension seven. But careful study showed that the manifold really was homeomorphic to $S^7$. Thus, there exists a differentiable structure on $S^7$ not diffeomorphic to the standard one.

— John Milnor (2009, p.12)

=== Milnor's construction ===
One of the first examples of an exotic sphere found by Milnor (1956, section 3). During the mid 1950s John Milnor^{pg 14} was trying to understand the structure of $(n-1)$-connected manifolds of dimension $2n$ (since $n$-connected $2n$-manifolds are homeomorphic to spheres, this is the first non-trivial case after) and found an example of a space which is homotopy equivalent to a sphere, but was not explicitly diffeomorphic. He did this through looking at real vector bundles $V \to S^n$ over a sphere and studied the properties of the associated disk bundle. It turns out, the boundary of this bundle is homotopically equivalent to a sphere $S^{2n-1}$, but in certain cases it is not diffeomorphic. This lack of diffeomorphism comes from studying a hypothetical cobordism between this boundary and a sphere, and showing this hypothetical cobordism invalidates certain properties of the Hirzebruch signature theorem.

Let $B^4$ be the unit ball in $\R^4$, and let $S^3$ be its boundary—a 3-sphere which we identify with the group of unit quaternions. Now take two copies of $B^4 \times S^3$, each with boundary $S^3 \times S^3$, and glue them together by identifying $(a,b)$ in the first boundary with $(a,a^2ba^{-1})$ in the second boundary. The resulting manifold (Milnor's sphere) has a natural smooth structure and is homeomorphic to $S^7$, but is not diffeomorphic to $S^7$. Milnor showed that it is not the boundary of any smooth 8-manifold with vanishing 4th Betti number, and has no orientation-reversing diffeomorphism to itself; either of these properties implies that it is not a standard 7-sphere. Milnor showed that this manifold has a Morse function with just two critical points, both non-degenerate, which implies that it is topologically a sphere.

=== Brieskorn spheres ===
As shown by Egbert Brieskorn (1966, 1966b) (see also (Hirzebruch & Mayer 1968)) the intersection of the complex manifold of points in $\Complex^5$ satisfying

$$a^2 + b^2 + c^2 + d^3 + e^{6k-1} = 0\$$

with a small sphere around the origin for $k = 1, 2, \ldots, 28$ gives all 28 possible smooth structures on the oriented 7-sphere. Similar manifolds are called Brieskorn spheres.

== Twisted spheres ==
Given an (orientation-preserving) diffeomorphism $f: S^{n-1} \to S^{n-1}$, gluing the boundaries of two copies of the standard disk $D^n$ together by f yields a manifold called a twisted sphere (with twist f). It is homotopy equivalent to the standard n-sphere because the gluing map is homotopic to the identity (being an orientation-preserving diffeomorphism, hence degree 1), but not in general diffeomorphic to the standard sphere. (Milnor 1959b) Setting $\Gamma_n$ to be the group of twisted n-spheres (under connect sum), one obtains the exact sequence

$$\pi_0\operatorname{Diff}^+(D^n) \to \pi_0\operatorname{Diff}^+(S^{n-1}) \to \Gamma_n \to 0.$$

For $n>5$, every exotic n-sphere is diffeomorphic to a twisted sphere, a result proven by Stephen Smale which can be seen as a consequence of the h-cobordism theorem. (In contrast, in the piecewise linear setting the left-most map is onto via radial extension: every piecewise-linear-twisted sphere is standard.) The group $\Gamma_n$ of twisted spheres is always isomorphic to the group $\Theta_n$. The notations are different because it was not known at first that they were the same for $n = 3$ or 4; for example, the case $n = 3$ is equivalent to the Poincaré conjecture.

In 1970 Jean Cerf proved the pseudoisotopy theorem which implies that $\pi_0 \operatorname{Diff}^+(D^n)$ is the trivial group provided $n \geq 6$, and so $\Gamma_n \simeq \pi_0 \operatorname{Diff}^+(S^{n-1})$ provided $n \geq 6$.

== Applications ==
If M is a piecewise linear manifold then the problem of finding the compatible smooth structures on M depends on knowledge of the groups Γ_{k} = Θ_{k}. More precisely, the obstructions to the existence of any smooth structure lie in the groups H_{k+1}(M, Γ_{k}) for various values of k, while if such a smooth structure exists then all such smooth structures can be classified using the groups H_{k}(M, Γ_{k}). In particular the groups Γ_{k} vanish if k < 7, so all PL manifolds of dimension at most 7 have a smooth structure, which is essentially unique if the manifold has dimension at most 6.

The following finite abelian groups are essentially the same:

- The group Θ_{n} of h-cobordism classes of oriented homotopy n-spheres.
- The group of h-cobordism classes of oriented n-spheres.
- The group Γ_{n} of twisted oriented n-spheres.
- The homotopy group π_{n}(PL/DIFF)
- If n ≠ 3, the homotopy group π_{n}(TOP/DIFF) (if n = 3 this group has order 2; see Kirby–Siebenmann invariant).
- The group of smooth structures of an oriented PL n-sphere.
- If n ≠ 4, the group of smooth structures of an oriented topological n-sphere.
- If n ≠ 5, the group of components of the group of all orientation-preserving diffeomorphisms of S^{n−1}.

== 4-dimensional exotic spheres and Gluck twists ==
In 4 dimensions it is not known whether there are any exotic smooth structures on the 4-sphere. The statement that they do not exist is known as the "smooth Poincaré conjecture", and is discussed by Michael Freedman, Robert Gompf, and Scott Morrison et al. (2010) who say that it is believed to be false.

Some candidates proposed for exotic 4-spheres are the Cappell–Shaneson spheres (Sylvain Cappell and Julius Shaneson (1976)) and those derived by Gluck twists (Gluck 1962). Gluck twist spheres are constructed by cutting out a tubular neighborhood of a 2-sphere S in S^{4} and gluing it back in using a diffeomorphism of its boundary S^{2} × S^{1}. The result is always homeomorphic to S^{4}. Many cases over the years were ruled out as possible counterexamples to the smooth 4 dimensional Poincaré conjecture. For example, Cameron Gordon (1976), José Montesinos (1983), Steven P. Plotnick (1984), Gompf (1991), Habiro, Marumoto & Yamada (2000), Selman Akbulut (2010), Gompf (2010), Kim & Yamada (2017).

== See also ==
- Gromoll–Meyer sphere, special Milnor sphere
- Atlas (topology)
- Clutching construction
- Exotic R^{4}
- Cerf theory
- Seven-dimensional space
- Oriented cobordism
