= 4-manifold =

Mathematical space

In mathematics, a 4-manifold is a 4-dimensional topological manifold. A smooth 4-manifold is a 4-manifold with a smooth structure. In dimension four, in marked contrast with lower dimensions, topological and smooth manifolds are quite different. There exist some topological 4-manifolds which admit no smooth structure, and even if there exists a smooth structure, it need not be unique (i.e. there are smooth 4-manifolds which are homeomorphic but not diffeomorphic).

4-manifolds are important in physics because in general relativity, spacetime is modeled as a pseudo-Riemannian 4-manifold.

== Topological 4-manifolds ==
The homotopy type of a simply connected compact 4-manifold only depends on the intersection form on the middle dimensional homology. A famous theorem of Michael Freedman (1982) implies that the homeomorphism type of the manifold only depends on this intersection form, and on a $\Z/2\Z$ invariant called the Kirby–Siebenmann invariant, and moreover that every combination of unimodular form and Kirby–Siebenmann invariant can arise, except that if the form is even, then the Kirby–Siebenmann invariant must be equal (mod 2) to 1/8 of the signature.

Examples:

- In the special case when the form is 0, this implies the 4-dimensional topological Poincaré conjecture.
- If the form is the E8 lattice, this gives a manifold called the E8 manifold, a manifold not homeomorphic to any simplicial complex.
- If the form is $\Z$, there are two manifolds depending on the Kirby–Siebenmann invariant: one is 2-dimensional complex projective space, and the other is a fake projective space, with the same homotopy type but not homeomorphic (and with no smooth structure).
- When the rank of the form is greater than about 28, the number of positive definite unimodular forms starts to increase extremely rapidly with the rank, so there are huge numbers of corresponding simply connected topological 4-manifolds (most of which seem to be of almost no interest).

Freedman's classification can be extended to some cases when the fundamental group is not too complicated; for example, when it is $\Z$, there is a classification similar to the one above using Hermitian forms over the group ring of $\Z$. If the fundamental group is too large (for example, a free group on 2 generators), then Freedman's techniques seem to fail and very little is known about such manifolds.

For any finitely presented group it is easy to construct a (smooth) compact 4-manifold with it as its fundamental group. (More specifically, for any finitely presented group, one constructs a manifold with the given fundamental group, such that two manifolds in this family are homeomorphic if and only if the fundamental groups are isomorphic.) As there can be no algorithm to tell whether two finitely presented groups are isomorphic (even if one is known to be trivial), there can be no algorithm to tell if two 4-manifolds have the same fundamental group. This is one reason why much of the work on 4-manifolds just considers the simply connected case: the general case of many problems is already known to be intractable.

== Smooth 4-manifolds ==
For manifolds of dimension at most 6, any piecewise linear (PL) structure can be smoothed in an essentially unique way, so in particular the theory of 4 dimensional PL manifolds is much the same as the theory of 4 dimensional smooth manifolds. Topological 4-manifolds don't have to be smoothable, but always are when non-compact, which is known as Quinn's theorem.

A major open problem in the theory of smooth 4-manifolds is to classify the simply connected compact ones. As the topological ones are known, this breaks up into two parts:

1. Which topological manifolds are smoothable?
2. Classify the different smooth structures on a smoothable manifold.

There is an almost complete answer to the first problem asking which simply connected compact 4-manifolds have smooth structures. First, the Kirby–Siebenmann class must vanish.

- If the intersection form is definite Donaldson's theorem (Donaldson 1983) gives a complete answer: there is a smooth structure if and only if the form is diagonalizable.
- If the form is indefinite and odd there is a smooth structure.
- If the form is indefinite, we may make its signature ≤ 0 by reversing orientation if necessary: then it is homeomorphic to a sum of m copies of II_{1,1} and 2n copies of E_{8}(−1) for some m and n. For m ≥ 3n (so the dimension is ≥ 11/8 |signature|), there is a smooth structure: the manifold is homeomorphic to a connected sum of n K3 surfaces and m − 3n copies of S^{2}×S^{2}. For m ≤ 2n (so the dimension is ≤ 10/8 |signature|), Furuta proved no smooth structure exists (Furuta 2001). This leaves a small gap between 10/8 and 11/8 where the answer is mostly unknown, but the "11/8 conjecture" states that smooth structures do not exist if the dimension is less than 11/8 times |signature|; i.e. there are no smooth structures in the gap. The smallest case not covered above has n = 2 and m = 5, but this has also been ruled out, so the smallest lattice for which the answer is not currently known (as of 2019) is the lattice II_{7,55} of rank 62 with n = 3 and m = 7.

By contrast, very little is known about the second question of classifying the smooth structures on a smoothable 4-manifold; in fact, there is not a single smoothable 4-manifold where the answer is fully known. Donaldson showed that there are some simply connected compact 4-manifolds, such as Dolgachev surfaces, with a countably infinite number of different smooth structures. There are an uncountable number of different smooth structures on R^{4}; see exotic R^{4}. Fintushel and Stern showed how to use surgery to construct large numbers of different smooth structures (indexed by arbitrary integral polynomials) on many different manifolds, using Seiberg–Witten invariants to show that the smooth structures are different. Their results suggest that any classification of simply connected smooth 4-manifolds will be very complicated. There are currently no plausible conjectures about what this classification might look like. (Some early conjectures that all simply connected smooth 4-manifolds might be connected sums of algebraic surfaces, or symplectic manifolds, possibly with orientations reversed, have been disproved.)

== Special phenomena in 4 dimensions ==
There are several fundamental theorems about manifolds that can be proved by low-dimensional methods in dimensions at most 3, and by completely different high-dimensional methods in dimension at least 5, but which are false in dimension 4. Here are some examples:

- In dimensions other than 4, the Kirby–Siebenmann invariant provides the obstruction to the existence of a PL structure; in other words a compact topological manifold has a PL structure if and only if its Kirby–Siebenmann invariant in H^{4}(M,Z/2Z) vanishes. In dimension 3 and lower, every topological manifold admits an essentially unique PL structure. In dimension 4 there are many examples with vanishing Kirby–Siebenmann invariant but no PL structure.
- In any dimension other than 4, a compact topological manifold has only a finite number of essentially distinct PL or smooth structures. In dimension 4, compact manifolds can have a countably-infinite number of non-diffeomorphic smooth structures.
- Four is the only dimension n for which R^{n} can have an exotic smooth structure. R^{4} has an uncountable number of exotic smooth structures; see exotic R^{4}.
- The solution to the smooth Poincaré conjecture is known in all dimensions other than 4 (it is usually false in dimensions at least 7; see exotic sphere). The Poincaré conjecture for PL manifolds has been proved for all dimensions other than 4. In 4 dimensions, the PL Poincaré conjecture is equivalent to the smooth Poincaré conjecture, and its truth is unknown.
- The smooth h-cobordism theorem holds for cobordisms provided that neither the cobordism nor its boundary has dimension 4. It can fail if the boundary of the cobordism has dimension 4 (as shown by Donaldson). If the cobordism has dimension 4, then it is unknown whether the h-cobordism theorem holds.
- A topological manifold of dimension not equal to 4 has a handlebody decomposition. Manifolds of dimension 4 have a handlebody decomposition if and only if they are smoothable.
- There are compact 4-dimensional topological manifolds that are not homeomorphic to any simplicial complex. Ciprian Manolescu showed that there are topological manifolds in each dimension greater than or equal to 5, that are not homeomorphic to a simplicial complex.

== Failure of the Whitney trick in dimension 4 ==
According to Frank Quinn, "Two n-dimensional submanifolds of a manifold of dimension 2n will usually intersect themselves and each other in isolated points. The "Whitney trick" uses an isotopy across an embedded 2-disk to simplify these intersections. Roughly speaking this reduces the study of n-dimensional embeddings to embeddings of 2-disks. But this is not a reduction when the dimension is 4: the 2-disks themselves are middle-dimensional, so trying to embed them encounters exactly the same problems they are supposed to solve. This is the phenomenon that separates dimension 4 from others."

== Geometrization in dimension four ==
The uniformization theorem for two-dimensional surfaces states that every simply connected Riemann surface can be given one of three geometries (Euclidean, spherical, or hyperbolic). In dimension 3, it is not always possible to assign a geometry to a closed 3-manifold but the resolution of the geometrization conjecture, proposed by William Thurston (1982), implies that closed 3-manifolds can be decomposed into geometric pieces.

Each of these pieces can have one of 8 possible geometries: spherical $S^3$, Euclidean $\mathbb{E}^3$, hyperbolic $\mathbf{H}^3_{\mathbb{R}}$, Nil geometry $\mathbf{Nil}^3$, Sol geometry $\mathbf{Sol}^3$, $\widetilde{\mathrm{SL}_2(\mathbb{R})}$, and the products $S^2\times \mathbb{R}$, and $\mathbf{H}^2_{\mathbb R}\times\mathbb{R}$.

In dimension four the situation is more complicated. Not every closed 4-manifold can be uniformized by a Lie group or even decomposed into geometrizable pieces. This follows from unsolvability of the homeomorphism problem for 4-manifolds. But, there is still a classification of 4-dimensional geometries due to Richard Filipkiewicz. These fall into 18 distinct geometries and one infinite family. An in depth discussion of the geometries and the manifolds that afford them is given in Hillman's book. The study of complex structures on geometrizable 4-manifolds was initiated by Wall.

== The four-dimensional geometries ==
The distinction in to the following classes is somewhat arbitrary, the emphasis has been placed on properties of the fundamental group and the uniformizing Lie group. The classification of the geometries is taken from. The descriptions of the fundamental groups as well as further information on the 4-manifolds that afford them can be found in Hillman's book

=== Spherical or compact type ===
Three geometries lie here, the 4-sphere $S^4$, the complex projective plane $\mathbf{P}^2_\mathbb{C}$, and a product of two 2-spheres $S^2\times S^2$. The fundamental group of any such manifold is finite.

=== Euclidean type ===
This is the four dimensional Euclidean space $\mathbb{E}^4$. With isometry group $\mathbb{R}^4\rtimes\mathrm{O}(4)$. The fundamental group of any such manifold is a Bieberbach group. There are 74 homeomorphism classes of manifolds with geometry $\mathbb{E}^4$, 27 orientable manifolds and 47 non-orientable manifolds.

=== Nilpotent type ===
There are two geometries of Nilpotent type $\mathbf{Nil}^4$ and the reducible geometry $\mathbf{Nil}^3\times\mathbb{R}$.

The $\mathbf{Nil}^4$ geometry is a 4-dimensional nilpotent Lie group given as the semi-direct product $\mathbb{R}^3\rtimes_\Theta\mathbb{R}$, where $\Theta(t)=\mathrm{diag}[t,t,\frac{1}{2}t^2]$. The fundamental group of a closed orientable $\mathbf{Nil}^4$-manifold is nilpotent of class 3.

For a closed 4-manifold $M$ admitting a $\mathbf{Nil}^3\times\mathbb{R}$ geometry, there is a finite cover $M'$ of $M$ such that $\pi_1 M\cong \Gamma\times\mathbb{Z}$. Here $\Gamma$ is the fundamental group of a 3-dimensional nilmanifold. Thus, every such fundamental group is nilpotent of class 2.

Note that one can always take $\Gamma$ above to be one of the following groups $\Gamma_q := \langle x,y,z\ |\ xz=zx,\ zy=yz,\ xy=z^qyx\rangle$, where $q\in\mathbb{Z}$ is non-zero. These are all fundamental groups of torus bundles over the circle.

=== Solvable type ===
There are two unique geometries $\mathbf{Sol}^4_0$, and $\mathbf{Sol}^4_1$. As well as a countably infinite family $\mathbf{Sol}^4_{m,n}$ where $m,n\geq1$ are integers.

The $\mathbf{Sol}^4_0$-geometry is the Lie group described by the semi-direct product $\mathbb{R}^3\rtimes_\xi\mathbb{R}$, where $\xi(t)=\mathrm{diag}[e^t,e^t,e^{-2t}]$. The fundamental group of a closed $\mathbf{Sol}^4_0$-manifold is a semidirect product $\mathbb{Z}^3\rtimes_A\mathbb{Z}$ where $A\in\mathrm{GL}_3(\mathbb{Z})$ has one real eigenvalue and two conjugate complex eigenvalues. The fundamental group has Hirsh length equal to 4.

The $\mathbf{Sol}^4_1$-geometry is the Lie group described by set of matrices $\left\{\left[\begin{array}{ccc} 1 & x & z \\ 0 & t & y \\ 0 & 0 & 1\end{array}\right]\ |\ x,y,z,t\in\mathbb{R},\ t>0\right\}$.

A closed $\mathbf{Sol}^4_1$-manifold $M$ is a mapping torus of a $\mathbf{Nil}^3$-manifold. Its fundamental group is a semidirect product $\Gamma_q\rtimes\mathbb{Z}$. The fundamental group has Hirsh length equal to 4.

Define $f(x)=x^3-mx^2+nx-1$. If $m,n$ are positive integers such that $0<2\sqrt{n}\leq m < n$, then $f(x)$ has three distinct real roots $a,b,c$.

The $\mathbf{Sol}^4_{m,n}$-geometry is the Lie group described by the semi-direct product $\mathbb{R}^3\rtimes_{\Phi_{m,n}}\mathbb{R}$, where $\Theta_{m,n}(t)=\mathrm{diag}[e^{at},e^{bt},e^{ct}]$. The fundamental group of a closed $\mathbf{Sol}^4_{m,n}$-manifold is a semidirect product $\mathbb{Z}^3\rtimes_A\mathbb{Z}$ where $A\in\mathrm{GL}_3(\mathbb{Z})$ has three distinct real eigenvalues. The fundamental group has Hirsh length equal to 4.

==== Isomorphisms between solvable geometries ====
Note that when $n=m$ that $\Theta_{n,n}$ has exactly one eigenvalue. So there is an identification $\mathbf{Sol}^4_{n,n}=\mathbf{Sol^3}\times\mathbb{R}$.

We have that $\mathbf{Sol}^4_{m,n}=\mathbf{Sol}^4_{m',n'}$ if the roots $(a,b,c)$ and $(a',b',c')$ satisfy $\lambda(a,b,c)=(a',b',c')$ for some real number $\lambda$.

A proof of these facts appears in.

=== Hyperbolic type ===
There are two geometries here real-hyperbolic 4-space $\mathbf{H}^4_{\mathbb{R}}$ and the complex hyperbolic plane $\mathbf{H}^2_{\mathbb{C}}$. The fundamental groups of closed manifolds here are word hyperbolic groups.

=== Product of hyperbolic planes ===
This is the geometry $\mathbf{H}^2_{\mathbb{R}}\times \mathbf{H}^2_{\mathbb{R}}$. Closed manifolds come in two forms here. A $\mathbf{H}^2_{\mathbb{R}}\times \mathbf{H}^2_{\mathbb{R}}$-manifold is reducible if it is finitely covered by a direct product of hyperbolic Riemann surfaces. Otherwise it is irreducible. The irreducible manifolds fundamental groups are arithmetic groups by Margulis' arithmeticity theorem.

=== The tangent space of the hyperbolic plane ===
This geometry admits no closed manifolds.

=== Remaining geometries ===
The remaining geometries come in two cases:

A product of two 2-dimensional geometries $S^2\times\mathbb{E}^2$ and $S^2\times\mathbf{H}^2_{\mathbb{R}}$.

A product of a 3-dimensional geometry with $\mathbb{R}$. These are $S^3\times\mathbb{R}$, $\mathbf{H}^3_{\mathbb{R}}\times\mathbb{R}$, and $\widetilde{\mathrm{SL}_2(\mathbb{R})}\times\mathbb{R}$.

== See also ==
- Kirby calculus
- Algebraic surface
- 3-manifold
- 5-manifold
- Enriques–Kodaira classification
- Casson handle
- Akbulut cork
