= Piecewise-smooth manifold =

Topological manifold with a piecewise smooth structure

Splines are piecewise-smooth, but not globally smooth or piecewise-linear.

In geometric topology, the piecewise-smooth or piecewise-differentiable manifolds are manifolds that have piecewise smooth transition maps between their local coordinate charts. These generalise the manifolds in DIFF (the category of smooth manifolds and smooth functions between them) and in PL (the category of piecewise linear manifolds and piecewise linear maps between them), allowing one to relate these properties. However, the piecewise-smooth maps are not closed under function composition, so the piecewise-smooth manifolds do not themselves form a category.

== History ==
That every smooth (indeed, C^{1}) manifold has a unique compatible PL structure (i.e. there exists a PL manifold, unique up to PL homeomorphism, that is piecewise-smoothly homeomorphic to the smooth manifold) was originally proven in (Whitehead 1940). A detailed expositionary proof is given in (Munkres 1966). The result is elementary and rather technical to prove in detail, so it is generally only sketched in modern texts, as in the brief proof outline given in (Thurston 1997). A very brief outline is given in (McMullen 1997), while a short but detailed proof is given in (Lurie 2009).
