= Intersection form of a 4-manifold =

Special symmetric bilinear form on the 2nd (co)homology group of a 4-manifold

In mathematics, the intersection form of an oriented compact 4-manifold is a special symmetric bilinear form on the 2nd (co)homology group of the 4-manifold. It reflects much of the topology of the 4-manifolds, including information on the existence of a smooth structure.

== Definition using intersection ==
Let $M$ be a closed 4-manifold (PL or smooth). Take a triangulation $T$ of $M$. Denote by $T^*$ the dual cell subdivision. Represent classes $a,b\in H_2(M;\Z/2\Z)$ by $2$-cycles $A$ and $B$ modulo $2$ viewed as unions of $2$-simplices of T and of $T^*$, respectively. Define the intersection form modulo $2$

$$\cap_{M,2}: H_2(M;\Z/2\Z) \times H_2(M;\Z/2\Z) \to \Z/2\Z$$

by the formula

$$a\cap_{M,2} b = |A\cap B|\bmod 2.$$

This is well-defined because the intersection of a cycle and a boundary consists of an even number of points (by definition of a cycle and a boundary).

If $M$ is oriented, analogously (i.e. counting intersections with signs) one defines the intersection form on the $2$nd homology group

$$Q_M=\cap_M=\cdot_M: H_2(M;\Z)\times H_2(M;\Z) \to \Z.$$

Using the notion of transversality, one can state the following results (which constitute an equivalent definition of the intersection form).

- If classes $a,b\in H_2(M;\Z/2\Z)$ are represented by closed surfaces (or $2$-cycles modulo $2$) $A$ and $B$ meeting transversely, then $a\cap_{M,2} b = |A\cap B|\mod2.$
- If $M$ is oriented and classes $a,b\in H_2(M;\Z)$ are represented by closed oriented surfaces (or $2$-cycles) $A$ and $B$ meeting transversely, then every intersection point in $A\cap B$ has the sign $+1$ or $-1$ depending on the orientations, and $Q_M(a,b)$ is the sum of these signs.

== Definition using cup product ==
Using the notion of the cup product $\smile$, one can give a dual (and so an equivalent) definition as follows. Let $M$ be a closed oriented 4-manifold (PL or smooth). Define the intersection form on the $2$nd cohomology group

$$Q_M\colon H^2(M;\Z)\times H^2(M;\Z)\to \Z$$

by the formula

$$Q_M(a,b)=\langle a\smile b,[M]\rangle.$$

The definition of a cup product is dual (and so is analogous) to the above definition of the intersection form on homology of a manifold, but is more abstract. However, the definition of a cup product generalizes to complexes and topological manifolds. This is an advantage for mathematicians who are interested in complexes and topological manifolds (not only in PL and smooth manifolds).

When the 4-manifold is smooth, then in de Rham cohomology, if $a$ and $b$ are represented by $2$-forms $\alpha$ and $\beta$, then the intersection form can be expressed by the integral

$$Q(a,b)= \int_M \alpha \wedge \beta$$

where $\wedge$ is the wedge product.

The definition using cup product has a simpler analogue modulo $2$ (which works for non-orientable manifolds). Of course one does not have this in de Rham cohomology.

== Properties and applications ==
Poincaré duality states that the intersection form is unimodular (up to torsion).

By Wu's formula, a spin 4-manifold must have even intersection form, i.e., $Q(x,x)$ is even for every x. For a simply-connected smooth 4-manifold (or more generally one with no 2-torsion residing in the first homology), the converse holds.

The signature of the intersection form is an important invariant. A 4-manifold bounds a 5-manifold if and only if it has zero signature. Van der Blij's lemma implies that a spin 4-manifold has signature a multiple of eight. In fact, Rokhlin's theorem implies that a smooth compact spin 4-manifold has signature a multiple of 16.

Michael Freedman used the intersection form to classify simply-connected topological 4-manifolds. Given any unimodular symmetric bilinear form over the integers, Q, there is a simply-connected closed 4-manifold M with intersection form Q. If Q is even, there is only one such manifold. If Q is odd, there are two, with at least one (possibly both) having no smooth structure. Thus two simply-connected closed smooth 4-manifolds with the same intersection form are homeomorphic. In the odd case, the two manifolds are distinguished by their Kirby–Siebenmann invariant.

Donaldson's theorem states a smooth simply-connected 4-manifold with positive definite intersection form has the diagonal (scalar 1) intersection form. So Freedman's classification implies there are many non-smoothable 4-manifolds, for example the E8 manifold.

== See also ==
- Wall theorems
