= Fake 4-ball =

Mathematical topological manifold

In mathematics, a fake 4-ball is a compact contractible topological 4-manifold. Michael Freedman proved that every three-dimensional homology sphere bounds a fake 4-ball. His construction involves the use of Casson handles and so does not work in the smooth category.
