= Kirby–Siebenmann class =

In mathematics, more specifically in geometric topology, the Kirby–Siebenmann class is an obstruction for topological manifolds to allow a PL-structure.

== The KS-class ==
For a topological manifold M, the Kirby–Siebenmann class $\kappa(M) \in H^4(M;\mathbb{Z}/2)$ is an element of the fourth cohomology group of M that vanishes if M admits a piecewise linear structure.

It is the only such obstruction, which can be phrased as the weak equivalence $TOP/PL \sim K(\mathbb Z/2,3)$ of TOP/PL with an Eilenberg–MacLane space..

The Kirby-Siebenmann class can be used to prove the existence of topological manifolds that do not admit a PL-structure. Concrete examples of such manifolds are $E_8 \times T^n, n \geq 1$, where $E_8$ stands for Freedman's E8 manifold.

The class is named after Robion Kirby and Larry Siebenmann, who developed the theory of topological and PL-manifolds.

== See also ==
- Hauptvermutung
- Kervaire–Milnor group, further obstruction for the existence of smooth structures
