= Piecewise linear manifold =

Topological manifold with a piecewise linear structure on it

In mathematics, a piecewise linear manifold (PL manifold) is a topological manifold together with a piecewise linear structure on it. Such a structure can be defined by means of an atlas, such that one can pass from chart to chart in it by piecewise linear functions. This is slightly stronger than the topological notion of a triangulation. (Note: A PL structure also requires that the link of a simplex be a PL-sphere. An example of a topological triangulation of a manifold that is not a PL structure is, in dimension n ≥ 5, the (n − 3)-fold suspension of the Poincaré sphere (with some fixed triangulation): it has a simplex whose link is the Poincaré sphere, a three-dimensional manifold that is not homeomorphic to a sphere, hence not a PL-sphere. See Triangulation (topology) § Piecewise linear structures for details.) An isomorphism of PL manifolds is called a PL homeomorphism.

== Relation to other categories of manifolds ==
PL sits between DIFF (the category of smooth manifolds) and TOP (the category of topological manifolds): it is categorically "better behaved" than DIFF — for example, the Generalized Poincaré conjecture is true in PL (with the possible exception of dimension 4, where it is equivalent to DIFF), but is false generally in DIFF — but is "worse behaved" than TOP, as elaborated in surgery theory.

=== Smooth manifolds ===
Every smooth manifold has a canonical PL structure — it is uniquely triangulizable, by Whitehead's theorem on triangulation (Whitehead 1940) — but a PL manifold might not have a smooth structure — it might not be smoothable. Smooth manifolds and PL manifolds are both contained in the set of piecewise-smooth manifolds, but piecewise smooth functions are not closed under composition, so these do not form a category.

One way in which PL is better behaved than DIFF is that one can take cones in PL, but not in DIFF — the cone point is acceptable in PL. A consequence is that the Generalized Poincaré conjecture is true in PL for dimensions greater than four — the proof is to take a homotopy sphere, remove two balls, apply the h-cobordism theorem to conclude that this is a cylinder, and then attach cones to recover a sphere. This last step works in PL but not in DIFF, giving rise to exotic spheres.

=== Topological manifolds ===
Not every topological manifold admits a PL structure, and of those that do, the PL structure need not be unique—it can have infinitely many. This is elaborated at Hauptvermutung.

The obstruction to placing a PL structure on a topological manifold M is the Kirby–Siebenmann class; to be precise, it is the obstruction to placing a PL-structure on M x R and in dimensions n > 4, the KS class vanishes if and only if M has at least one PL-structure.

=== Real algebraic sets ===
An A-structure on a PL manifold is a structure which gives an inductive way of resolving the PL manifold to a smooth manifold. Compact PL manifolds admit A-structures. Compact PL manifolds are homeomorphic to real-algebraic sets. Put another way, A-category sits over the PL-category as a richer category with no obstruction to lifting, that is BA → BPL is a product fibration with BA = BPL × PL/A, and PL manifolds are real algebraic sets because A-manifolds are real algebraic sets.

=== Combinatorial manifolds and digital manifolds ===
- A combinatorial manifold is a kind of manifold which is discretization of a manifold. It usually means a piecewise linear manifold made by simplicial complexes.
- A digital manifold is a special kind of combinatorial manifold which is defined in digital space. See digital topology.

== See also ==
- Simplicial manifold
