= E8 manifold =

Topological manifold in mathematics

In low-dimensional topology, a branch of mathematics, the E_{8} manifold is the unique compact, simply connected topological 4-manifold with intersection form the E_{8} lattice.

== History ==
The $E_8$ manifold was discovered by Michael Freedman in 1982. Rokhlin's theorem shows that it has no smooth structure (as does Donaldson's theorem), and in fact, combined with the work of Andrew Casson on the Casson invariant, this shows that the $E_8$ manifold is not even triangulable as a simplicial complex.

== Construction ==
The manifold can be constructed by first plumbing together disc bundles of Euler number 2 over the sphere, according to the Dynkin diagram for $E_8$. This results in $P_{E_8}$, a 4-manifold whose boundary is homeomorphic to the Poincaré homology sphere. Freedman's theorem on fake 4-balls then says we can cap off this homology sphere with a fake 4-ball to obtain the $E_8$ manifold.

== Properties ==
- $M_{E_8}\times S^n$ and $M_{E_8}\times T^n$ have no smooth structure (and not even a PL structure) for any $n\geq 0$.

== Connected sums ==
Freedman's classification yields the following three orientation-preserving homeomorphisms between connected sums of the $E_8$-manifold $M_{E_8}$, the orientation-reversed $E_8$-manifold $\overline{M_{E_8}}$, fake second complex projective space $*\mathbb{C}P^2$ and the K3 surface $\mathrm{K3}$ (solutions of $x^4+y^4+z^4+w^4=0$ in twistor space $\mathbb{C}P^3$):

$$\overline{M_{E_8}}\#*\mathbb{C}P^2
\cong\mathbb{C}P^2\#8\overline{\mathbb{C}P^2};$$
$$M_{E_8}\#\overline{M_{E_8}}
\cong\#8(S^2\times S^2);$$
$$2\overline{M_{E_8}}\#3(S^2\times S^2)
\cong\mathrm{K3}.$$

Required are the isomorphisms of their intersection forms: $-E_8\oplus[+1]\cong[+1]\oplus8[-1]$ follows from Serre's classification, furthermore
$$E_8\oplus-E_8\cong 8\begin{bmatrix}
0 & 1 \\
1 & 0
\end{bmatrix}$$
and
$$Q_\mathrm{K3}\cong -2E_8\oplus 3\begin{bmatrix}
0 & 1 \\
1 & 0
\end{bmatrix}$$
. In the above homeomorphisms, $\mathbb{C}P^2\#8\overline{\mathbb{C}P^2}$ is the complex surface underlying the Barlow surface, an exotic smooth structure. Now the above connected sums show, that even though the left sides have no canonical smooth structure (hence cannot give any diffeomorphism), these are smoothable just like the right sides and potentially even in multiple ways.

== See also ==
- E_{8} (mathematics) – 248-dimensional exceptional simple Lie group
- Glossary of topology
- List of geometric topology topics
