= Triangulation (topology) =

Representation of mathematical space

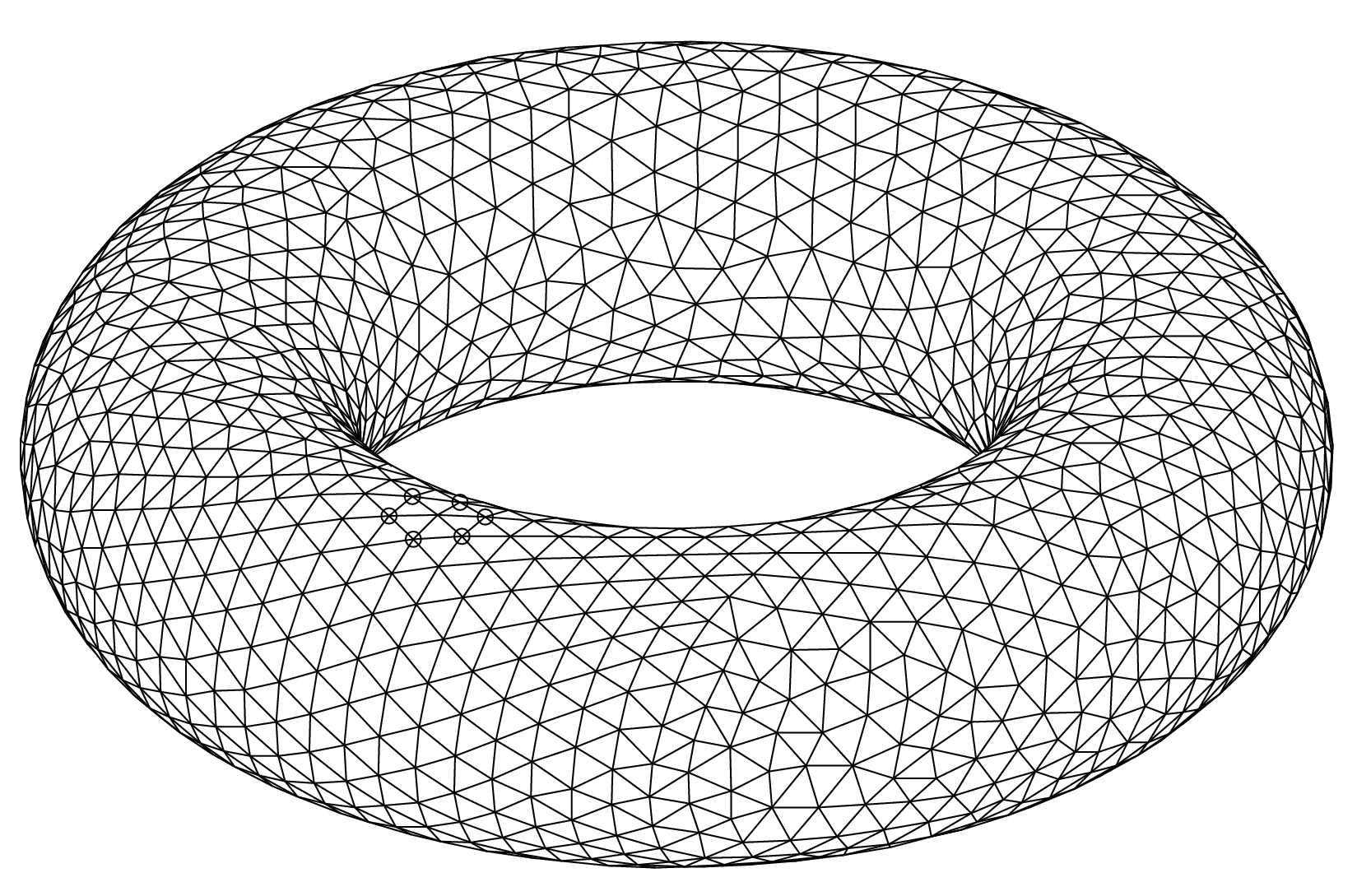
A triangulated torus

Another triangulation of the torus

A triangulated dolphin shape

In mathematics, triangulation describes the replacement of topological spaces with simplicial complexes by the choice of an appropriate homeomorphism. A space that admits such a homeomorphism is called a triangulable space. Triangulations can also be used to define a piecewise linear structure for a space, if one exists. Triangulation has various applications both in and outside of mathematics, for instance in algebraic topology, in complex analysis, and in modeling.

== Motivation ==
On the one hand, it is sometimes useful to forget about superfluous information of topological spaces: The replacement of the original spaces with simplicial complexes may help to recognize crucial properties and to gain a better understanding of the considered object.

On the other hand, simplicial complexes are objects of combinatorial character and therefore one can assign them quantities arising from their combinatorial pattern, for instance, the Euler characteristic. Triangulation allows one to assign such quantities to topological spaces.

Investigations concerning the existence and uniqueness of triangulations established a new branch in topology, namely piecewise linear topology (or PL topology). Its main purpose is to study the topological properties of simplicial complexes and their generalizations, cell-complexes.

== Simplicial complexes ==
=== Abstract simplicial complexes ===
An abstract simplicial complex above a set $V$ is a system $\mathcal{T} \subset \mathcal{P}(V)$ of non-empty subsets such that:

- $\{v_0\} \in \mathcal{T}$ for each $v_0\in V$;
- if $E \in \mathcal{T}$ and $\emptyset \neq F\subset E,$ then $F \in \mathcal{T}$.

The elements of $\mathcal{T}$ are called simplices, the elements of $V$ are called vertices. A simplex with $n+1$ vertices has dimension $n$ by definition. The dimension of an abstract simplicial complex is defined as $\text{dim}(\mathcal{T})= \text{sup}\;\{\text{dim}(F):F \in \mathcal{T}\} \in \mathbb{N}\cup \infty$.

Abstract simplicial complexes can be realized as geometrical objects by associating each abstract simplex with a geometric simplex, defined below.

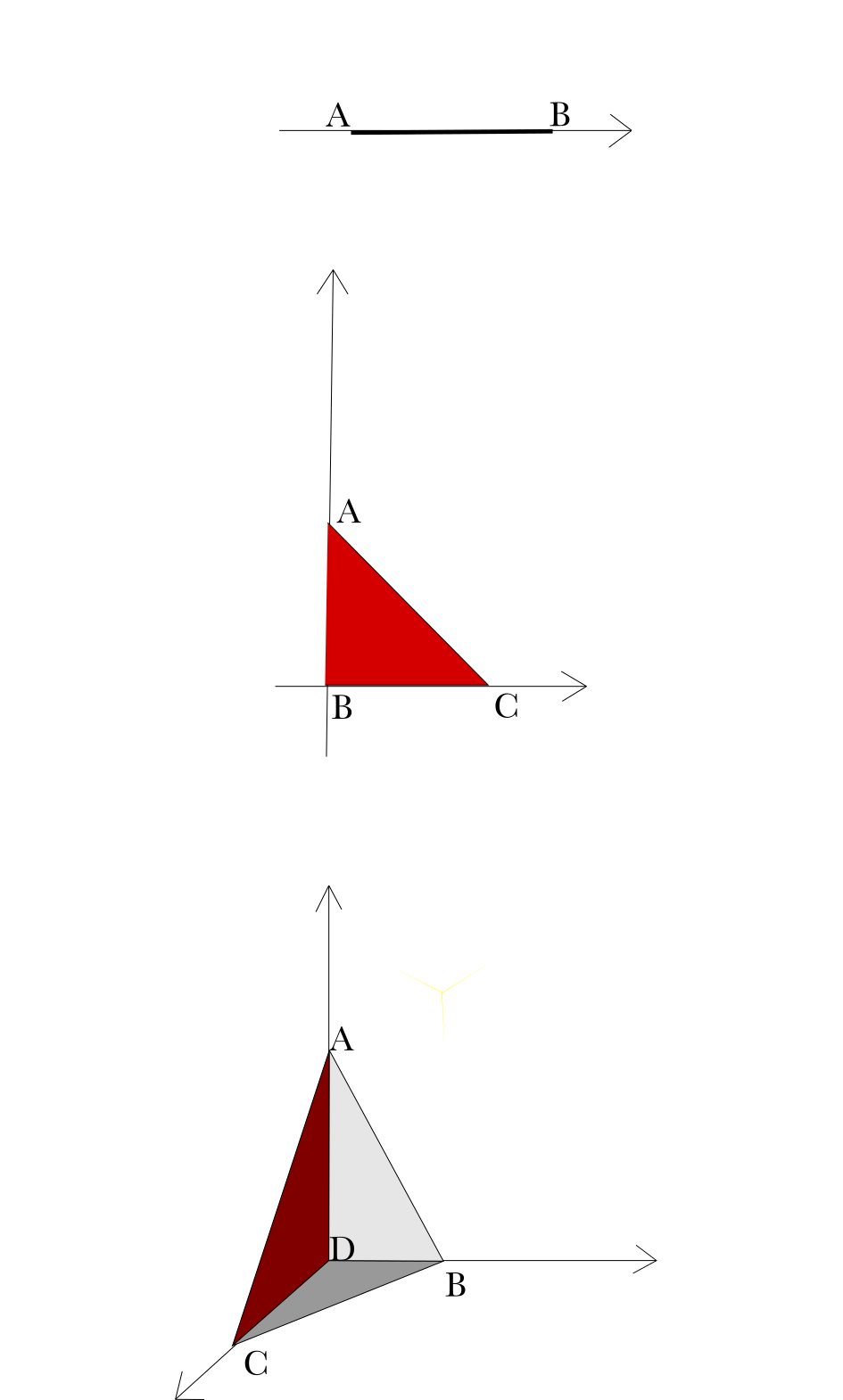
Geometric simplices in dimension 1, 2 and 3

=== Geometric simplices ===
Let $p_0,...p_n$ be $n+1$ affinely independent points in $\mathbb{R}^n$; i.e. the vectors $(p_1-p_0), (p_2-p_0),\dots (p_n-p_0)$ are linearly independent. The set $\Delta = \{ \sum_{i=0}^n t_ip_i \,|\, \text{each}\, t_i \in [0,1] \,\text{and}\, \sum_{i=0}^n t_i = 1\}$ is said to be the simplex spanned by $p_0,...p_n$. It has dimension $n$ by definition. The points $p_0,...p_n$ are called the vertices of $\Delta$, the simplices spanned by $n$ of the $n+1$ vertices are called faces, and the boundary $\partial \Delta$ is defined to be the union of the faces.

The $n$-dimensional standard-simplex is the simplex spanned by the unit vectors $e_0,...e_n$

=== Geometric simplicial complexes ===
A geometric simplicial complex $\mathcal{S}\subseteq\mathcal{P}(\mathbb{R}^n)$ is a collection of geometric simplices such that

- If $S$ is a simplex in $\mathcal{S}$, then all its faces are in $\mathcal{S}$.
- If $S, T$ are two distinct simplices in $\mathcal{S}$, their interiors are disjoint.

The union of all the simplices in $\mathcal{S}$ gives the set of points of $\mathcal{S}$, denoted $|\mathcal{S}|=\bigcup_{S \in \mathcal{S}} S.$ This set $|\mathcal{S}|$ is endowed with a topology by choosing the closed sets to be $\{A \subseteq |\mathcal{S}| \;\mid\; A \cap \Delta$ is closed for all $\Delta \in \mathcal{S}\}$. Note that, in general, this topology is not the same as the subspace topology that $|\mathcal{S}|$ inherits from $\mathbb{R}^n$. The topologies do coincide in the case that each point in the complex lies only in finitely many simplices.

Each geometric complex can be associated with an abstract complex by choosing as a ground set $V$ the set of vertices that appear in any simplex of $\mathcal{S}$ and as system of subsets the subsets of $V$ which correspond to vertex sets of simplices in $\mathcal{S}$.

A natural question is if vice versa, any abstract simplicial complex corresponds to a geometric complex. The answer is positive when the abstract complex is finite, i.e. the set $V$ is finite. If its cardinality is $n$, take $n$ affinely independent points in $\mathbb{R}^{n-1}$ and construct the geometric simplices as prescribed by the abstract simplicial complex. The idea is that you have enough space to build all the simplices.

In general, the geometric construction as mentioned here is not flexible enough: consider for instance an abstract simplicial complex of infinite dimension. However, the following more abstract construction provides a topological space for any kind of abstract simplicial complex:

Let $\mathcal{T}$ be an abstract simplicial complex above a set $V$. Choose a union of simplices $(\Delta_F)_{F \in \mathcal{T}}$, but each in $\mathbb {R}^N$ of dimension sufficiently large, such that the geometric simplex $\Delta_F$ is of dimension $n$ if the abstract geometric simplex $F$ has dimension $n$. If $E\subset F$, $\Delta_E\subset \mathbb{R}^N$can be identified with a face of $\Delta_F\subset\mathbb{R}^M$ and the resulting topological space is the gluing $\Delta_E \cup_{i}\Delta_F.$ Effectuating the gluing for each inclusion, one ends up with the desired topological space. This space is actually unique up to homeomorphism for each choice of $\mathcal{T},$ so it makes sense to talk about the geometric realization $|\mathcal{T}|$ of $\mathcal{T}.$

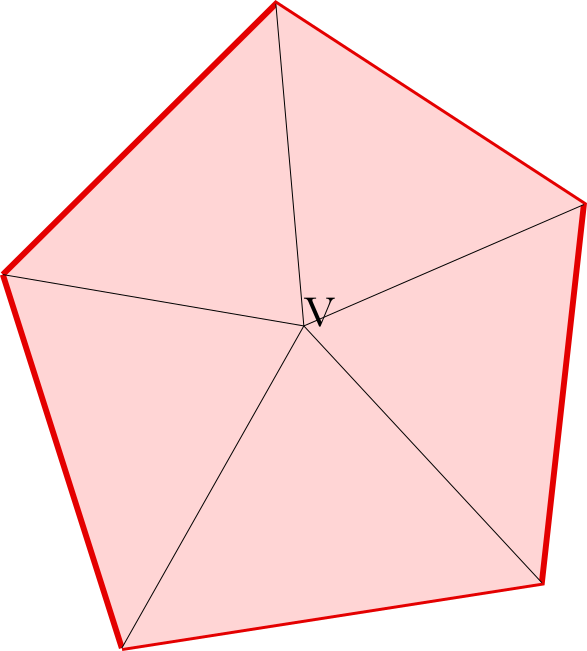
A 2-dimensional geometric simplicial complex with vertex V, link(V), and star(V) are highlighted in red and pink.

As in the previous construction, by the topology induced by gluing, the closed sets in this space are the subsets that are closed in the subspace topology of every simplex $\Delta_F$ in the complex.

The simplicial complex $\mathcal{T_n}$ which consists of all simplices $\mathcal{T}$ of dimension $\leq n$ is called the $n$-th skeleton of $\mathcal{T}$.

A natural neighbourhood of a vertex $v \in V$ in a simplicial complex $\mathcal{S}$ is considered to be given by the star $\operatorname{star}(v)=\{ L \in \mathcal{S} \;\mid\; v \in L \}$ of a simplex, whose boundary is the link $\operatorname{link}(v)$.

=== Simplicial maps ===
The maps considered in this category are simplicial maps: Let $\mathcal{K}$, $\mathcal{L}$ be abstract simplicial complexes above sets $V_K$, $V_L$. A simplicial map is a function $f:V_K \rightarrow V_L$ which maps each simplex in $\mathcal{K}$ onto a simplex in $\mathcal{L}$. By affine-linear extension on the simplices, $f$ induces a map between the geometric realizations of the complexes.

=== Examples ===
- Let $W =\{a,b,c,d,e,f\}$ and let $\mathcal{T} = \Big\{ \{a\}, \{b\},\{c\},\{d\},\{e\},\{f\}, \{a,b\},\{a,c\},\{a,d\},\{a,e\},\{a,f\}\Big\}$. The associated geometric complex is a star with center $\{a\}$.
- Let $V= \{A,B,C,D\}$ and let $\mathcal{S} = \mathcal{P}(V)$. Its geometric realization $|\mathcal{S}|$ is a tetrahedron.
- Let $V$ as above and let $\mathcal{S}' =\; \mathcal{P}(V)\setminus \{A,B,C,D\}$. The geometric simplicial complex is the boundary of a tetrahedron $|\mathcal{S'}| = \partial |\mathcal{S}|$.

== Definition ==
A triangulation of a topological space $X$ is a homeomorphism $t: |\mathcal{T}|\rightarrow X$ where $\mathcal{T}$ is a simplicial complex. Topological spaces do not necessarily admit a triangulation and if they do, it is not necessarily unique.

=== Examples ===
- Simplicial complexes can be triangulated by identity.
- Let $\mathcal{S}, \mathcal{S'}$ be as in the examples seen above. The closed unit ball $\mathbb{D}^3$ is homeomorphic to a tetrahedron so it admits a triangulation, namely the homeomorphism $t:|\mathcal{S}| \rightarrow \mathbb{D}^3$. Restricting $t$ to $|\mathcal{S}'|$ yields a homeomorphism $t':|\mathcal{S}'| \rightarrow \mathbb{S}^2$.
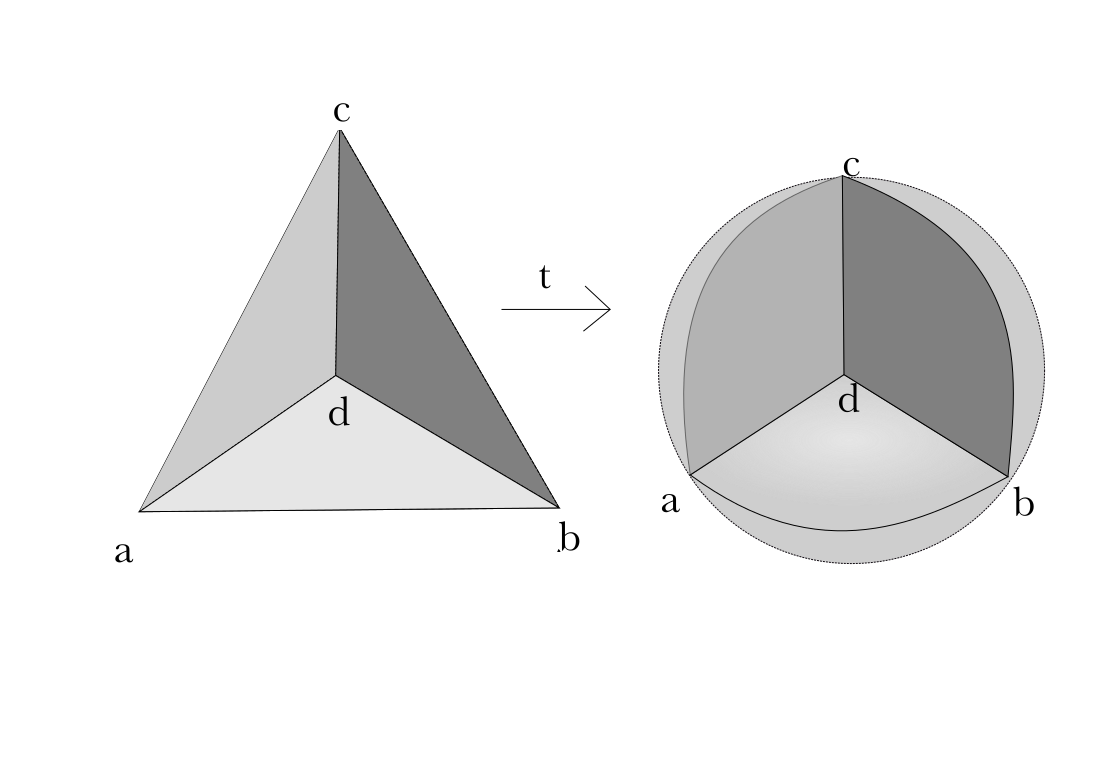
  The 2-dimensional sphere and a triangulation
- The torus $\mathbb{T}^2 = \mathbb{S}^1 \times \mathbb{S}^1$ admits a triangulation. To see this, consider the torus as a square where the parallel faces are glued together. A triangulation of the square that respects the gluings, like that shown below, also defines a triangulation of the torus.
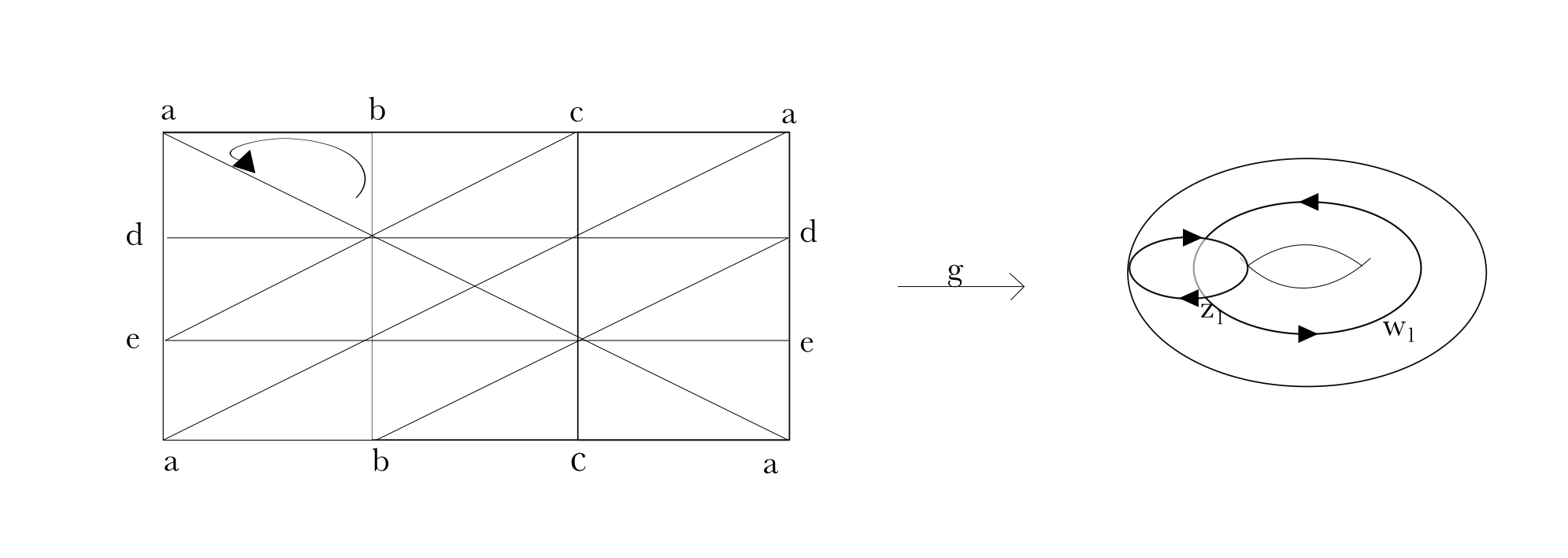
  A two dimensional torus, represented as the gluing of a square via the map g, identifying its opposite sites
- The projective plane $\mathbb{P}^2$ admits a triangulation (see CW-complexes)
- One can show that differentiable manifolds admit triangulations.

== Invariants ==
Triangulations of spaces allow assigning combinatorial invariants rising from their dedicated simplicial complexes to spaces. These are characteristics that equal for complexes that are isomorphic via a simplicial map and thus have the same combinatorial pattern.

This data might be useful to classify topological spaces up to homeomorphism but only given that the characteristics are also topological invariants, meaning, they do not depend on the chosen triangulation. For the data listed here, this is the case. For details and the link to singular homology, see topological invariance.

=== Homology ===
Via triangulation, one can assign a chain complex to topological spaces that arise from its simplicial complex and compute its simplicial homology. Compact spaces always admit finite triangulations and therefore their homology groups are finitely generated and only finitely many of them do not vanish. Other data as Betti-numbers or Euler characteristic can be derived from homology.

==== Betti-numbers and Euler-characteristics ====
Let $|\mathcal{S}|$ be a finite simplicial complex. The $n$-th Betti-number $b_n(\mathcal{S})$ is defined to be the rank of the $n$-th simplicial homology group of the spaces. These numbers encode geometric properties of the spaces: The Betti-number $b_0(\mathcal{S})$ for instance represents the number of connected components. For a triangulated, closed orientable surfaces $F$, $b_1(F)= 2g$ holds where $g$ denotes the genus of the surface: Therefore its first Betti-number represents the doubled number of handles of the surface.

With the comments above, for compact spaces all Betti-numbers are finite and almost all are zero. Therefore, one can form their alternating sum
$$\sum_{k=0}^{\infty} (-1)^{k}b_k(\mathcal{S})$$
which is called the Euler characteristic of the complex, a catchy topological invariant.

=== Topological invariance ===
To use these invariants for the classification of topological spaces up to homeomorphism one needs invariance of the characteristics regarding homeomorphism.

A famous approach to the question was at the beginning of the 20th century the attempt to show that any two triangulations of the same topological space admit a common subdivision. This assumption is known as Hauptvermutung ( German: Main assumption). Let $|\mathcal{L}|\subset \mathbb{R}^N$ be a simplicial complex. A complex $|\mathcal{L'}|\subset \mathbb{R}^N$ is said to be a subdivision of $\mathcal{L}$ iff:

- every simplex of $\mathcal{L'}$ is contained in a simplex of $\mathcal{L}$ and
- every simplex of $\mathcal{L}$ is a finite union of simplices in $\mathcal{L'}$ .

Those conditions ensure that subdivisions does not change the simplicial complex as a set or as a topological space. A map $f: \mathcal{K} \rightarrow \mathcal{L}$ between simplicial complexes is said to be piecewise linear if there is a refinement $\mathcal{K'}$ of $\mathcal{K}$ such that $f$ is piecewise linear on each simplex of $\mathcal{K}$. Two complexes that correspond to another via piecewise linear bijection are said to be combinatorial isomorphic. In particular, two complexes that have a common refinement are combinatorially equivalent. Homology groups are invariant to combinatorial equivalence and therefore the Hauptvermutung would give the topological invariance of simplicial homology groups. In 1918, Alexander introduced the concept of singular homology. Henceforth, most of the invariants arising from triangulation were replaced by invariants arising from singular homology. For those new invariants, it can be shown that they were invariant regarding homeomorphism and even regarding homotopy equivalence. Furthermore it was shown that singular and simplicial homology groups coincide. This workaround has shown the invariance of the data to homeomorphism. Hauptvermutung lost in importance but it was initial for a new branch in topology: The piecewise linear topology (short PL-topology).

== Hauptvermutung ==
The Hauptvermutung (German for main conjecture) states that two triangulations always admit a common subdivision. Originally, its purpose was to prove invariance of combinatorial invariants regarding homeomorphisms. The assumption that such subdivisions exist in general is intuitive, as subdivisions are easy to construct for simple spaces, for instance for low dimensional manifolds. Indeed the assumption was proven for manifolds of dimension $\leq 3$ and for differentiable manifolds but it was disproved in general: An important tool to show that triangulations do not admit a common subdivision, that is, their underlying complexes are not combinatorially isomorphic is the combinatorial invariant of Reidemeister torsion.

=== Reidemeister torsion ===
To disprove the Hauptvermutung it is helpful to use combinatorial invariants which are not topological invariants. A famous example is Reidemeister torsion. It can be assigned to a tuple $(K,L)$ of CW-complexes: If $L = \emptyset$ this characteristic will be a topological invariant but if $L \neq \emptyset$ in general not. An approach to Hauptvermutung was to find homeomorphic spaces with different values of Reidemeister torsion. This invariant was used initially to classify lens-spaces and first counterexamples to the Hauptvermutung were built based on lens-spaces:

=== Classification of lens spaces ===
In its original formulation, lens spaces are 3-manifolds, constructed as quotient spaces of the 3-sphere: Let $p, q$ be natural numbers, such that $p, q$ are coprime. The lens space $L(p,q)$ is defined to be the orbit space of the free group action

$$\Z/p\Z\times S^{3}\to S^{3}$$
$$(k,(z_1,z_2)) \mapsto (z_1 \cdot e^{2\pi i k/p}, z_2 \cdot e^{2\pi i kq/p} )$$.

For different tuples $(p, q)$, lens spaces will be homotopy equivalent but not homeomorphic. Therefore they can't be distinguished with the help of classical invariants as the fundamental group but by the use of Reidemeister torsion.

Two lens spaces $L(p,q_1), L(p,q_2)$ are homeomorphic, if and only if $q_1 \equiv \pm q_2^{\pm 1} \pmod{p}$. This is the case if and only if two lens spaces are simple homotopy equivalent. The fact can be used to construct counterexamples for the Hauptvermutung as follows. Suppose there are spaces $L'_1, L'_2$ derived from non-homeomorphic lens spaces $L(p,q_1), L(p,q_2)$ having different Reidemeister torsion. Suppose further that the modification into $L'_1, L'_2$ does not affect Reidemeister torsion but such that after modification $L'_1$ and $L'_2$ are homeomorphic. The resulting spaces will disprove the Hauptvermutung.

== Existence of triangulation ==
Besides the question of concrete triangulations for computational issues, there are statements about spaces that are easier to prove given that they are simplicial complexes. Especially manifolds are of interest. Topological manifolds of dimension $\leq 3$ are always triangulable but there are non-triangulable manifolds for dimension $n$, for $n$ arbitrary but greater than three. Further, differentiable manifolds always admit triangulations.

== Piecewise linear structures ==
Manifolds are an important class of spaces. It is natural to require them not only to be triangulable but moreover to admit a piecewise linear atlas, a PL-structure:

Let $|X|$ be a simplicial complex such that every point admits an open neighborhood $U$ such that there is a triangulation of $U$ and a piecewise linear homeomorphism $f: U \rightarrow \mathbb{R}^n$. Then $|X|$ is said to be a piecewise linear (PL) manifold of dimension $n$ and the triangulation together with the PL-atlas is said to be a PL-structure on $|X|$.

An important lemma is the following:

Let $X$ be a topological space. Then the following statements are equivalent:

1. $X$ is an $n$-dimensional manifold and admits a PL-structure.
2. There is a triangulation of $X$ such that the link of each vertex is an $n-1$ sphere.
3. For each triangulation of $X$ the link of each vertex is an $n-1$ sphere.

The equivalence of the second and the third statement is because that the link of a vertex is independent of the chosen triangulation up to combinatorial isomorphism. One can show that differentiable manifolds admit a PL-structure as well as manifolds of dimension $\leq 3$. Counterexamples for the triangulation conjecture are counterexamples for the conjecture of the existence of PL-structure of course.

Moreover, there are examples for triangulated spaces which do not admit a PL-structure. Consider an $n-2$-dimensional PL-homology-sphere $X$. The double suspension $S^2X$ is a topological $n$-sphere. Choosing a triangulation $t: |\mathcal{S}| \rightarrow S^2 X$ obtained via the suspension operation on triangulations the resulting simplicial complex is not a PL-manifold, because there is a vertex $v$ such that $link(v)$ is not a $n-1$ sphere.

A question arising with the definition is if PL-structures are always unique: Given two PL-structures for the same space $Y$, is there a there a homeomorphism $F:Y\rightarrow Y$ which is piecewise linear with respect to both PL-structures? The assumption is similar to the Hauptvermutung and indeed there are spaces which have different PL-structures which are not equivalent. Triangulation of PL-equivalent spaces can be transformed into one another via Pachner moves:

=== Pachner Moves ===
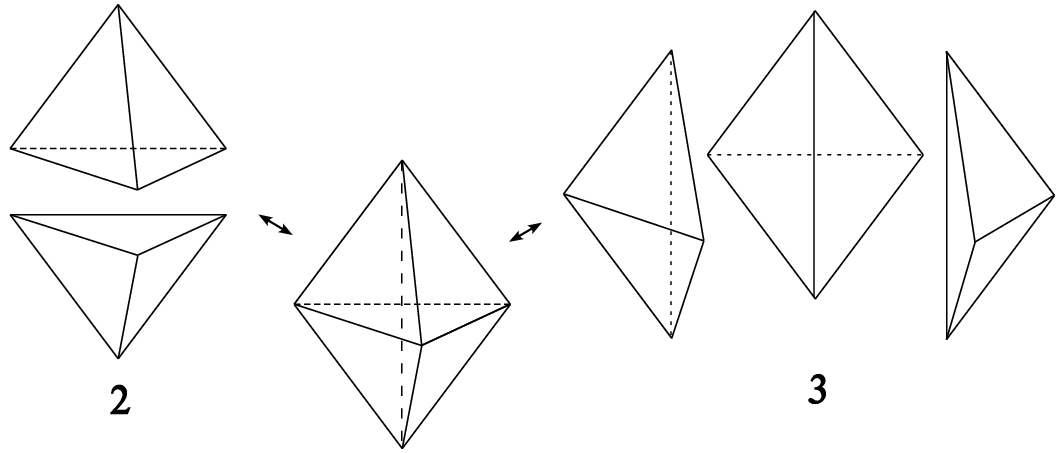
One Pachner-move replaces two tetrahedra by three tetrahedra

Pachner moves are a way to manipulate triangulations: Let $\mathcal{S}$ be a simplicial complex. For two simplices $K, L,$ the Join $K*L = \{ (1-t)k+tl\;|\; k \in K, l \in L, t \in [0,1]\}$ is the set of points that lie on straights between points in $K$ and in $L$. Choose $S \in \mathcal{S}$ such that $lk(S)= \partial K$ for any $K$ lying not in $\mathcal{S}$. A new complex $\mathcal{S'}$, can be obtained by replacing $S * \partial K$ by $\partial S * K$. This replacement is called a Pachner move. The theorem of Pachner states that whenever two triangulated manifolds are PL-equivalent, there is a series of Pachner moves transforming both into another.

== Cellular complexes ==
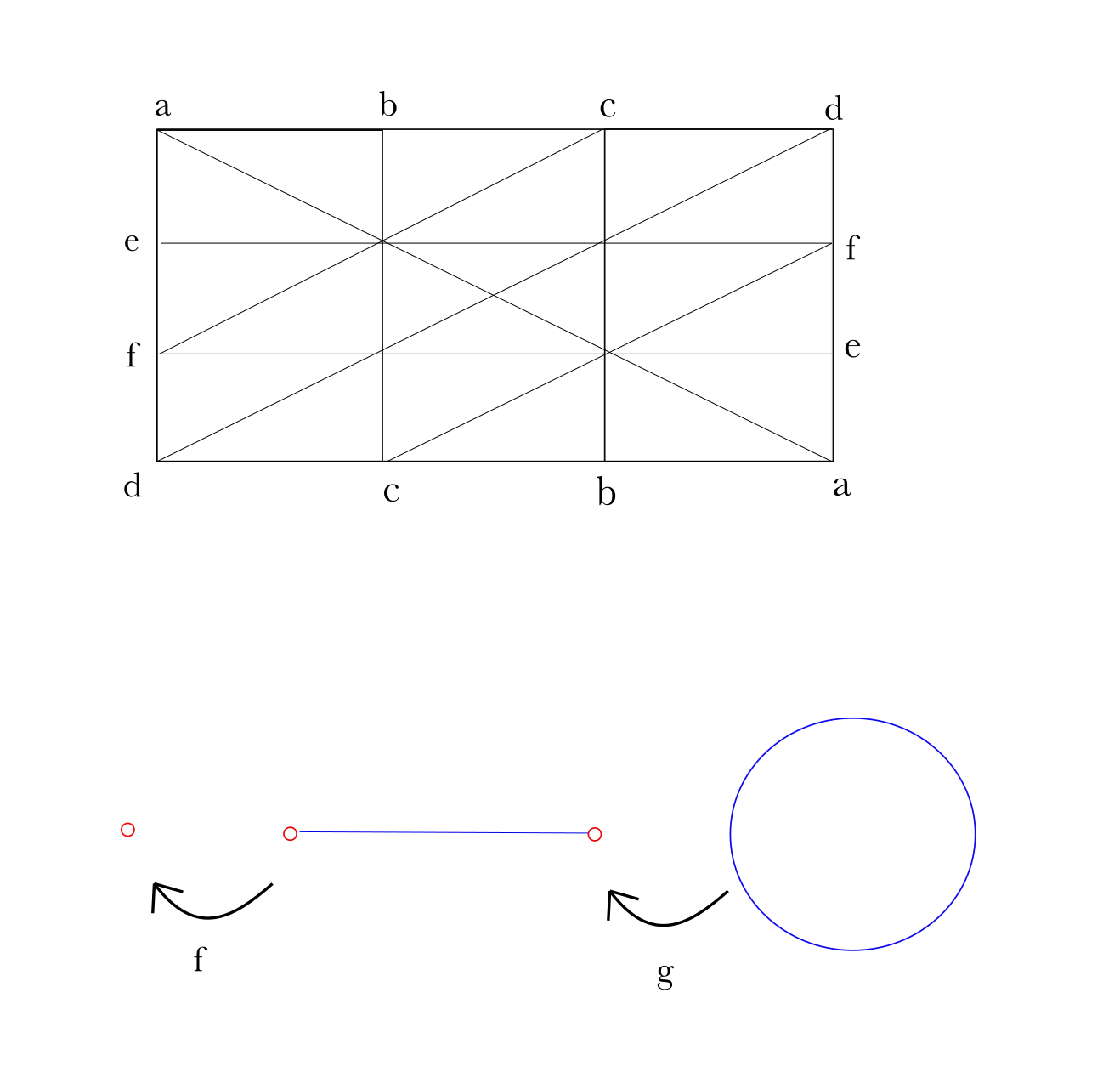
The real projective plane as a simplicial complex and as CW-complex. As CW-complex it can be obtained by gluing first $\mathbb{D}^0$ and $\mathbb{D}^1$ to get the 1-sphere and then attaching the disc $\mathbb{D}^2$ by the map $g: \mathbb{S}^1 \rightarrow \mathbb{S}^1, e^{ix} \mapsto e^{2ix}$.

A similar but more flexible construction than simplicial complexes is the one of cellular complexes (or CW-complexes). Its construction is as follows:

An $n$-cell is the closed $n$-dimensional unit-ball $B_n= [0,1]^n$, an open $n$-cell is its inner $B_n= [0,1]^n\setminus \mathbb{S}^{n-1}$. Let $X$ be a topological space, let $f: \mathbb{S}^{n-1}\rightarrow X$ be a continuous map. The gluing $X \cup_{f}B_n$ is said to be obtained by gluing on an $n$-cell.

A cell complex is a union $X=\cup_{n\geq 0} X_n$ of topological spaces such that

- $X_0$ is a discrete set
- each $X_n$ is obtained from $X_{n-1}$ by gluing on a family of $n$-cells.

Each simplicial complex is a CW-complex, the inverse is not true. The construction of CW-complexes can be used to define cellular homology and one can show that cellular homology and simplicial homology coincide. For computational issues, it is sometimes easier to assume spaces to be CW-complexes and determine their homology via cellular decomposition, an example is the projective plane $\mathbb{P}^2$: Its construction as a CW-complex needs three cells, whereas its simplicial complex consists of 54 simplices.

== Other applications ==
=== Classification of manifolds ===
By triangulating 1-dimensional manifolds, one can show that they are always homeomorphic to disjoint copies of the real line and the unit sphere $\mathbb{S}^1$. The classification of closed surfaces, i.e. compact 2-manifolds, can also be proven by using triangulations. This is done by showing any such surface can be triangulated and then using the triangulation to construct a fundamental polygon for the surface.

=== Maps on simplicial complexes ===
Giving spaces simplicial structures can help to understand continuous maps defined on the spaces. The maps can often be assumed to be simplicial maps via the simplicial approximation theorem:

==== Simplicial approximation ====
Let $\mathcal{K}$, $\mathcal{L}$ be abstract simplicial complexes above sets $V_K$, $V_L$. A simplicial map is a function $f:V_K \rightarrow V_L$ which maps each simplex in $\mathcal{K}$ onto a simplex in $\mathcal{L}$. By affin-linear extension on the simplices, $f$ induces a map between the geometric realizations of the complexes. Each point in a geometric complex lies in the inner of exactly one simplex, its support. Consider now a continuous map $f:\mathcal{K}\rightarrow \mathcal{L}$. A simplicial map $g:\mathcal{K}\rightarrow \mathcal{L}$ is said to be a simplicial approximation of $f$ if and only if each $x \in \mathcal{K}$ is mapped by $g$ onto the support of $f(x)$ in $\mathcal{L}$. If such an approximation exists, one can construct a homotopy $H$ transforming $f$ into $g$ by defining it on each simplex; there it always exists, because simplices are contractible.

The simplicial approximation theorem guarantees for every continuous function $f:V_K \rightarrow V_L$ the existence of a simplicial approximation at least after refinement of $\mathcal{K}$, for instance by replacing $\mathcal{K}$ by its iterated barycentric subdivision. The theorem plays an important role for certain statements in algebraic topology in order to reduce the behavior of continuous maps on those of simplicial maps, for instance in Lefschetz's fixed-point theorem.

==== Lefschetz's fixed-point theorem ====
The Lefschetz number is a useful tool to find out whether a continuous function admits fixed-points. This data is computed as follows: Suppose that $X$ and $Y$ are topological spaces that admit finite triangulations. A continuous map $f: X\rightarrow Y$ induces homomorphisms $f_i: H_i(X,K)\rightarrow H_i(Y,K)$ between its simplicial homology groups with coefficients in a field $K$. These are linear maps between $K$-vector spaces, so their trace $\operatorname{tr}_i$ can be determined and their alternating sum

$L_K(f)= \sum_i(-1)^i\operatorname{tr}_i(f) \in K$

is called the Lefschetz number of $f$. If $f =\rm id$, this number is the Euler characteristic of $K$. The fixpoint theorem states that whenever $L_K(f)\neq 0$, $f$ has a fixed-point. In the proof this is first shown only for simplicial maps and then generalized for any continuous functions via the approximation theorem. Brouwer's fixpoint theorem treats the case where $f:\mathbb{D}^n \rightarrow \mathbb{D}^n$ is an endomorphism of the unit-ball. For $k \geq 1$ all its homology groups $H_k(\mathbb{D}^n)$ vanishes, and $f_0$ is always the identity, so $L_K(f) =\operatorname{tr}_0(f) = 1 \neq 0$, so $f$ has a fixpoint.

==== Formula of Riemann-Hurwitz ====
The Riemann-Hurwitz formula allows to determine the genus of a compact, connected Riemann surface $X$ without using explicit triangulation. The proof needs the existence of triangulations for surfaces in an abstract sense: Let $F:X \rightarrow Y$ be a non-constant holomorphic function on a surface with known genus. The relation between the genus $g$ of the surfaces $X$ and $Y$ is

$2g(X)-2=\deg(F)(2g(Y)-2)+\sum_{x\in X}(\operatorname{ord}(F)-1)$

where $\deg(F)$ denotes the degree of the map. The sum is well defined as it counts only the ramifying points of the function.

The background of this formula is that holomorphic functions on Riemann surfaces are ramified coverings. The formula can be found by examining the image of the simplicial structure near to ramifiying points.

== See also ==
- Triangulation (geometry)
- Triangle mesh

== Literature ==
- Allen Hatcher: Algebraic Topology, Cambridge University Press, Cambridge/New York/Melbourne 2006, ISBN 0-521-79160-X
- James R. Munkres: . Band 1984. Addison Wesley, Menlo Park, California 1984, ISBN 0-201-04586-9
- Marshall M. Cohen: A course in Simple-Homotopy Theory. In: Graduate Texts in Mathematics. 1973, ISSN 0072-5285, doi:10.1007/978-1-4684-9372-6.
