= Smooth structure =

Maximal smooth atlas for a topological manifold

In mathematics, a smooth structure on a manifold allows for an unambiguous notion of smooth function. In particular, a smooth structure allows mathematical analysis to be performed on the manifold.

== Definition ==
A smooth structure on a manifold $M$ is a collection of smoothly equivalent smooth atlases. Here, a smooth atlas for a topological manifold $M$ is an atlas for $M$ such that each transition function is a smooth map, and two smooth atlases for $M$ are smoothly equivalent provided their union is again a smooth atlas for $M.$ This gives a natural equivalence relation on the set of smooth atlases.

A smooth manifold is a topological manifold $M$ together with a smooth structure on $M.$

=== Maximal smooth atlases ===
By taking the union of all atlases belonging to a smooth structure, we obtain a maximal smooth atlas. This atlas contains every chart that is compatible with the smooth structure. There is a natural one-to-one correspondence between smooth structures and maximal smooth atlases. Thus, we may regard a smooth structure as a maximal smooth atlas and vice versa.

In general, computations with the maximal atlas of a manifold are rather unwieldy. For most applications, it suffices to choose a smaller atlas. For example, if the manifold is compact, then one can find an atlas with only finitely many charts.

=== Equivalence of smooth structures ===
If $\mu$ and $\nu$ are two maximal smooth atlases on $M$ then these two maximal smooth atlases $\mu$ and $\nu$ are said to be equivalent if there is a bijection $f : M \to M$ satisfying the property that for all $p\in M$ there exists some $(U,\varphi)\in \mu$ with $p\in U$ and there exists some $(V,\psi)\in\nu$ with $f(U)\subseteq V$ such that the transition function $\psi\circ f\circ\varphi^{-1}:\varphi(U\cap V)\to\psi(U\cap V)$ is a smooth mapping, and satisfying the property that for all $q\in M$ there exists some $(W,\phi)\in\nu$ with $q\in W$ as well as some $(Z,\chi)\in\mu$ with $f^{-1}(W)\subseteq Z$ such that the transition function $\chi\circ f^{-1}\circ\phi^{-1}:\phi(W\cap Z)\to\chi(W\cap Z)$ is a smooth mapping; this is the sense in which the bijection $f:M\to M$ is required to be a diffeomorphism; the function $f:M\to M$ and its inverse $f^{-1}:M\to M$ must be smooth relative to both maximal smooth atlases on $M$.

== Exotic spheres ==
John Milnor showed in 1956 that the 7-dimensional sphere admits a smooth structure that is not equivalent to the standard smooth structure. A sphere equipped with a nonstandard smooth structure is called an exotic sphere.

== E8 manifold ==
The E8 manifold is an example of a topological manifold that does not admit a smooth structure. This essentially demonstrates that Rokhlin's theorem holds only for smooth structures, and not topological manifolds in general.

== Related structures ==
The smoothness requirements on the transition functions can be weakened, so that the transition maps are only required to be $k$-times continuously differentiable; or strengthened, so that the transition maps are required to be real-analytic. Accordingly, this gives a $C^k$ or (real-)analytic structure on the manifold rather than a smooth one. Similarly, a complex structure can be defined by requiring the transition maps to be holomorphic.

== See also ==
- Smooth frame – Generalization of an ordered basis of a vector space
- Atlas (topology) – Set of charts that describes a manifold
