= Topological manifold =

Type of topological space

In topology, a topological manifold is a topological space that locally resembles real n-dimensional Euclidean space. Topological manifolds are an important class of topological spaces, with applications throughout mathematics. All manifolds are topological manifolds by definition, so the qualifier "topological" emphasizes the lack of additional structure. E.g. differentiable manifolds are topological manifolds equipped with a differential structure. Every manifold has an "underlying" topological manifold, obtained by simply "forgetting" the added structure. However, not every topological manifold can be endowed with a particular additional structure. For example, the E8 manifold is a topological manifold which cannot be endowed with a differentiable structure.

== Formal definition ==
A topological space X is called locally Euclidean if there is a non-negative integer n such that every point in X has a neighborhood which is homeomorphic to an open subset of n-dimensional Euclidean space.

A topological manifold is a locally Euclidean Hausdorff space. It is common to place additional requirements on topological manifolds. In particular, many authors define them to be paracompact or second-countable.

In the remainder of this article a manifold will mean a topological manifold. An n-manifold will mean a topological manifold such that every point has a neighborhood homeomorphic to an open subset of n-dimensional Euclidean space.

== Examples ==
=== n-manifolds ===
- The real coordinate space R^{n} is an n-manifold.
- Any discrete space is a 0-dimensional manifold.
- A circle is a compact 1-manifold.
- A torus and a Klein bottle are compact 2-manifolds (or surfaces).
- The n-dimensional sphere S^{n} is a compact n-manifold.
- The n-dimensional torus T^{n} (the product of n circles) is a compact n-manifold.

=== Projective manifolds ===
- Projective spaces over the reals, complexes, or quaternions are compact manifolds.
  - Real projective space RP^{n} is a n-dimensional manifold.
  - Complex projective space CP^{n} is a 2n-dimensional manifold.
  - Quaternionic projective space HP^{n} is a 4n-dimensional manifold.
- Manifolds related to projective space include Grassmannians, flag manifolds, and Stiefel manifolds.

=== Other manifolds ===
- Differentiable manifolds are a class of topological manifolds equipped with a differential structure.
- Lens spaces are a class of differentiable manifolds that are quotients of odd-dimensional spheres.
- Lie groups are a class of differentiable manifolds equipped with a compatible group structure.
- The E8 manifold is a topological manifold which cannot be given a differentiable structure.

== Properties ==
The property of being locally Euclidean is preserved by local homeomorphisms. That is, if X is locally Euclidean of dimension n and f : Y → X is a local homeomorphism, then Y is locally Euclidean of dimension n. In particular, being locally Euclidean is a topological property.

Manifolds inherit many of the local properties of Euclidean space. In particular, they are locally compact, locally connected, first countable, locally contractible, and locally metrizable. Being locally compact Hausdorff spaces, manifolds are necessarily Tychonoff spaces.

Adding the Hausdorff condition can make several properties become equivalent for a manifold. As an example, we can show that for a Hausdorff manifold, the notions of σ-compactness and second-countability are the same. Indeed, a Hausdorff manifold is a locally compact Hausdorff space, hence it is (completely) regular. Assume such a space X is σ-compact. Then it is Lindelöf, and because Lindelöf + regular implies paracompact, X is metrizable. But in a metrizable space, second-countability coincides with being Lindelöf, so X is second-countable. Conversely, if X is a Hausdorff second-countable manifold, it must be σ-compact.

A manifold need not be connected, but every manifold M is a disjoint union of connected manifolds. These are just the connected components of M, which are open sets since manifolds are locally-connected. Being locally path connected, a manifold is path-connected if and only if it is connected. It follows that the path-components are the same as the components.

=== The Hausdorff axiom ===
The Hausdorff property is not a local one; so even though Euclidean space is Hausdorff, a locally Euclidean space need not be. It is true, however, that every locally Euclidean space is T_{1}.

An example of a non-Hausdorff locally Euclidean space is the line with two origins. This space is created by replacing the origin of the real line with two points, an open neighborhood of either of which includes all nonzero numbers in some open interval centered at zero. This space is not Hausdorff because the two origins cannot be separated.

=== Compactness and countability axioms ===
A manifold is metrizable if and only if it is paracompact. The long line is an example a normal Hausdorff 1-dimensional topological manifold that is not metrizable nor paracompact. Since metrizability is such a desirable property for a topological space, it is common to add paracompactness to the definition of a manifold. In any case, non-paracompact manifolds are generally regarded as pathological. Paracompact manifolds have all the topological properties of metric spaces. In particular, they are perfectly normal Hausdorff spaces.

Manifolds are also commonly required to be second-countable. This is precisely the condition required to ensure that the manifold embeds in some finite-dimensional Euclidean space. For any manifold the properties of being second-countable, Lindelöf, and σ-compact are all equivalent.

Every second-countable manifold is paracompact, but not vice versa. However, the converse is nearly true: a paracompact manifold is second-countable if and only if it has a countable number of connected components. In particular, a connected manifold is paracompact if and only if it is second-countable. Every second-countable manifold is separable and paracompact. Moreover, if a manifold is separable and paracompact then it is also second-countable.

Every compact manifold is second-countable and paracompact.

=== Dimensionality ===
By invariance of domain, a non-empty n-manifold cannot be an m-manifold for n ≠ m. The dimension of a non-empty n-manifold is n. Being an n-manifold is a topological property, meaning that any topological space homeomorphic to an n-manifold is also an n-manifold.

== Coordinate charts ==
By definition, every point of a locally Euclidean space has a neighborhood homeomorphic to an open subset of $\mathbb R^n$. Such neighborhoods are called Euclidean neighborhoods. It follows from invariance of domain that Euclidean neighborhoods are always open sets. One can always find Euclidean neighborhoods that are homeomorphic to "nice" open sets in $\mathbb R^n$. Indeed, a space M is locally Euclidean if and only if either of the following equivalent conditions holds:

- every point of M has a neighborhood homeomorphic to an open ball in $\mathbb R^n$.
- every point of M has a neighborhood homeomorphic to $\mathbb R^n$ itself.

A Euclidean neighborhood homeomorphic to an open ball in $\mathbb R^n$ is called a Euclidean ball. Euclidean balls form a basis for the topology of a locally Euclidean space.

For any Euclidean neighborhood U, a homeomorphism $\phi : U \rightarrow \phi \left ( U \right ) \subset \mathbb R^n$ is called a coordinate chart on U (although the word chart is frequently used to refer to the domain or range of such a map). A space M is locally Euclidean if and only if it can be covered by Euclidean neighborhoods. A set of Euclidean neighborhoods that cover M, together with their coordinate charts, is called an atlas on M. (The terminology comes from an analogy with cartography whereby a spherical globe can be described by an atlas of flat maps or charts).

Given two charts $\phi$ and $\psi$ with overlapping domains U and V, there is a transition function

$$\psi\phi^{-1} : \phi \left ( U \cap V \right ) \rightarrow \psi \left ( U \cap V \right )$$

Such a map is a homeomorphism between open subsets of $\mathbb R^n$. That is, coordinate charts agree on overlaps up to homeomorphism. Different types of manifolds can be defined by placing restrictions on types of transition maps allowed. For example, for differentiable manifolds the transition maps are required to be smooth.

== Classification of manifolds ==
=== Discrete spaces (0-Manifold) ===
A 0-manifold is just a discrete space. A discrete space is second-countable if and only if it is countable.

=== Curves (1-Manifold) ===
Every nonempty, paracompact, connected 1-manifold is homeomorphic either to R or the circle.

=== Surfaces (2-Manifold) ===
The sphere is a 2-manifold.

Every nonempty, compact, connected 2-manifold (or surface) is homeomorphic to the sphere, a connected sum of tori, or a connected sum of projective planes.

=== Volumes (3-Manifold) ===
A classification of 3-manifolds results from Thurston's geometrization conjecture, proven by Grigori Perelman in 2003. More specifically, Perelman's results provide an algorithm for deciding if two three-manifolds are homeomorphic to each other.

=== General n-manifold ===
The full classification of n-manifolds for n greater than three is known to be impossible; it is at least as hard as the word problem in group theory, which is known to be algorithmically undecidable.

In fact, there is no algorithm for deciding whether a given manifold is simply connected. There is, however, a classification of simply connected manifolds of dimension ≥ 5.

=== Manifolds with boundary ===
A slightly more general concept is sometimes useful. A topological manifold with boundary is a Hausdorff space in which every point has a neighborhood homeomorphic to an open subset of Euclidean half-space (for a fixed n):

$$\mathbb R^n_{+} = \{(x_1,\ldots,x_n) \in \mathbb R^n : x_n \ge 0\}.$$

Every topological manifold is a topological manifold with boundary, but not vice versa.

== Constructions ==
There are several methods of creating manifolds from other manifolds.

=== Product manifolds ===
If M is an m-manifold and N is an n-manifold, the Cartesian product M×N is a (m+n)-manifold when given the product topology.

=== Disjoint union ===
The disjoint union of a countable family of n-manifolds is a n-manifold (the pieces must all have the same dimension).

=== Connected sum ===
The connected sum of two n-manifolds is defined by removing an open ball from each manifold and taking the quotient of the disjoint union of the resulting manifolds with boundary, with the quotient taken with regards to a homeomorphism between the boundary spheres of the removed balls. This results in another n-manifold.

=== Submanifold ===
Any open subset of an n-manifold is an n-manifold with the subspace topology.
