= Atlas (topology) =

Set of charts that describes a manifold

In mathematics, particularly topology, an atlas is a concept used to describe a manifold. An atlas consists of individual charts that, roughly speaking, describe individual regions of the manifold. In general, the notion of atlas underlies the formal definition of a manifold and related structures such as vector bundles and other fiber bundles.

== Charts ==
The definition of an atlas depends on the notion of a chart. A chart for a topological space M is a homeomorphism $\varphi$ from an open subset U of M to an open subset of a Euclidean space. The chart is traditionally recorded as the ordered pair $(U, \varphi)$.

When a coordinate system is chosen in the Euclidean space, this defines coordinates on $U$: the coordinates of a point $P$ of $U$ are defined as the coordinates of $\varphi(P).$ The pair formed by a chart and such a coordinate system is called a local coordinate system, coordinate chart, coordinate patch, coordinate map, or local frame.

== Formal definition of atlas ==
An atlas for a topological space $M$ is an indexed family $\{(U_{\alpha}, \varphi_{\alpha}) : \alpha \in I\}$ of charts on $M$ which covers $M$ (that is, $\bigcup_{\alpha\in I} U_{\alpha} = M$). If for some fixed n, the image of each chart is an open subset of n-dimensional Euclidean space, then $M$ is said to be an n-dimensional manifold.

The plural of atlas is atlases, although some authors use atlantes.

An atlas $\left( U_i, \varphi_i \right)_{i \in I}$ on an $n$-dimensional manifold $M$ is called an adequate atlas if the following conditions hold:

- The image of each chart is either $\R^n$ or $\R_+^n$, where $\R_+^n$ is the closed half-space,
- $\left( U_i \right)_{i \in I}$ is a locally finite open cover of $M$, and
- $M = \bigcup_{i \in I} \varphi_i^{-1}\left( B_1 \right)$, where $B_1$ is the open ball of radius 1 centered at the origin.

Every second-countable manifold admits an adequate atlas. Moreover, if $\mathcal{V} = \left( V_j \right)_{j \in J}$ is an open covering of the second-countable manifold $M$, then there is an adequate atlas $\left( U_i, \varphi_i \right)_{i \in I}$ on $M$, such that $\left( U_i\right)_{i \in I}$ is a refinement of $\mathcal{V}$.

== Transition maps ==
Two charts on a manifold, and their respective transition map

A transition map provides a way of comparing two charts of an atlas. To make this comparison, we consider the composition of one chart with the inverse of the other. This composition is not well-defined unless we restrict both charts to the intersection of their domains of definition. (For example, if we have a chart of Europe and a chart of Russia, then we can compare these two charts on their overlap, namely the European part of Russia.)

To be more precise, suppose that $(U_{\alpha}, \varphi_{\alpha})$ and $(U_{\beta}, \varphi_{\beta})$ are two charts for a manifold M such that $U_{\alpha} \cap U_{\beta}$ is non-empty. The transition map $\tau_{\alpha,\beta}: \varphi_{\alpha}(U_{\alpha} \cap U_{\beta}) \to \varphi_{\beta}(U_{\alpha} \cap U_{\beta})$ is the map defined by
$$\tau_{\alpha,\beta} = \varphi_{\beta} \circ \varphi_{\alpha}^{-1}.$$

Note that since $\varphi_{\alpha}$ and $\varphi_{\beta}$ are both homeomorphisms, the transition map $\tau_{\alpha, \beta}$ is also a homeomorphism.

== More structure ==
One often desires more structure on a manifold than simply the topological structure. For example, if one would like an unambiguous notion of differentiation of functions on a manifold, then it is necessary to construct an atlas whose transition functions are differentiable. Such a manifold is called differentiable. Given a differentiable manifold, one can unambiguously define the notion of tangent vectors and then directional derivatives.

If each transition function is a smooth map, then the atlas is called a smooth atlas, and the manifold itself is called smooth. Alternatively, one could require that the transition maps have only k continuous derivatives in which case the atlas is said to be $C^k$.

Very generally, if each transition function belongs to a pseudogroup $\mathcal G$ of homeomorphisms of Euclidean space, then the atlas is called a $\mathcal G$-atlas. If the transition maps between charts of an atlas preserve a local trivialization, then the atlas defines the structure of a fibre bundle.

== See also ==
- Smooth atlas
- Smooth frame
