= List of things named after John Milnor =

Things named after an American mathematician John Milnor:

- Barratt–Milnor sphere
- Fáry–Milnor theorem
- Milnor conjecture in algebraic K-theory
- Milnor conjecture in knot theory
- Milnor conjecture concerning manifolds with nonnegative Ricci curvature
- Milnor construction
- Milnor K-theory
- Milnor fibration
- Milnor invariants
- Milnor manifold
- Milnor map
- Milnor–Moore theorem
- Milnor number
- Milnor ring
- Milnor sphere
- Milnor theorem
- Milnor–Thurston kneading theory
- Milnor Frame concerning left invariant metrics on three-dimensional Lie groups
- Milnor–Wood inequality
- Švarc–Milnor lemma
