= Milnor conjecture =

Milnor conjecture may refer to:

- Milnor conjecture (K-theory) in algebraic K-theory
- Milnor conjecture (knot theory) in knot theory
- Milnor conjecture (Ricci curvature) concerning manifolds with nonnegative Ricci curvature

== See also ==
- List of things named after John Milnor
