= Generalized Poincaré conjecture =

Whether a manifold which is a homotopy sphere is a sphere

In the mathematical area of topology, the generalized Poincaré conjecture is a statement that a manifold that is a homotopy sphere is a sphere. More precisely, one fixes a category of manifolds: topological (Top), piecewise linear (PL), or differentiable (Diff). Then the statement is

Every homotopy sphere (a closed n-manifold which is homotopy equivalent to the n-sphere) in the chosen category (i.e. topological manifolds, PL manifolds, or smooth manifolds) is isomorphic in the chosen category (i.e. homeomorphic, PL-isomorphic, or diffeomorphic) to the standard n-sphere.

The name derives from the Poincaré conjecture, which was made for (topological or PL) manifolds of dimension 3, where being a homotopy sphere is equivalent to being simply connected and closed. The generalized Poincaré conjecture is known to be true or false in a number of instances, due to the work of many distinguished topologists, including the Fields Medal awardees John Milnor, Steve Smale, Michael Freedman, and Grigori Perelman.

== Status ==
Here is a summary of the status of the generalized Poincaré conjecture in various settings.

- Top: True in all dimensions.
- PL: True in dimensions other than 4; unknown in dimension 4, where it is equivalent to Diff.
- Diff: False generally, with the first known counterexample in dimension 7 (Milnor sphere). True in some dimensions including 1, 2, 3, 5, 6, 12, 56 and 61. This list includes all odd dimensions for which the conjecture is true. For even dimensions, it is true only for those on the list, possibly dimension 4, and possibly some additional dimensions $\ge 64$ (though it is conjectured that there are none such). The case of dimension 4 is equivalent to PL.

Thus the veracity of the Poincaré conjectures is different in each category Top, PL, and Diff. In general, the notion of isomorphism differs among the categories, but it is the same in dimension 3 and below. In dimension 4, PL and Diff agree, but Top differs. In dimensions above 6 they all differ. In dimensions 5 and 6 every PL manifold admits an infinitely differentiable structure that is so-called Whitehead compatible.

== History ==
The cases n = 1 and 2 have long been known by the classification of manifolds in those dimensions.

For a PL or smooth homotopy n-sphere, in 1960 Stephen Smale proved for $n\ge 7$ that it was homeomorphic to the n-sphere and subsequently extended his proof to $n\ge 5$; he received a Fields Medal for his work in 1966. Shortly after Smale's announcement of a proof, John Stallings gave a different proof for dimensions at least 7 that a PL homotopy n-sphere was homeomorphic to the n-sphere, using the notion of "engulfing". E. C. Zeeman modified Stalling's construction to work in dimensions 5 and 6. In 1962, Smale proved that a PL homotopy n-sphere is PL-isomorphic to the standard PL n-sphere for n at least 5. In 1966, M. H. A. Newman extended PL engulfing to the topological situation and proved that for $n \ge 5$ a topological homotopy n-sphere is homeomorphic to the n-sphere.

Michael Freedman solved the topological case $n = 4$ in 1982 and received a Fields Medal in 1986. The initial proof consisted of a 50-page outline, with many details missing. Freedman gave a series of lectures at the time, convincing experts that the proof was correct. A project to produce a written version of the proof with background and all details filled in began in 2013, with Freedman's support. The project's output, edited by Stefan Behrens, Boldizsar Kalmar, Min Hoon Kim, Mark Powell, and Arunima Ray, with contributions from 20 mathematicians, was published in August 2021 in the form of a 496-page book, The Disc Embedding Theorem.

Grigori Perelman solved the case $n = 3$ (where the topological, PL, and differentiable cases all coincide) in 2003 in a sequence of three papers. He was offered a Fields Medal in August 2006 and the Millennium Prize from the Clay Mathematics Institute in March 2010, but declined both.

In the smooth category for $n>4$, studying the Poincaré conjecture comes down to determining the elements of the Kervaire-Milnor short exact sequence of groups

$0\to bP_{n+1} \to\Theta_{n}\to \pi_{n}^S/(\mathrm{Image}(J_{n}))\to 0\,$

where the order of the Kervaire–Milnor group $\Theta_{n}$ equals the number of distinct smooth structures on $S^{n} \, (n>4)$. Here $\pi_{n}^S$ is the $n$-th stable homotopy group and $J_n$ is the J-homomorphism $J_{n} \colon \pi_{n}(\mathrm{SO}) \to \pi_{n}^S$, where $\mathrm{SO}$ is the infinite special orthogonal group. The quotient group $\pi_{n}^S/(\mathrm{Image}(J_{n}))$ is usually denoted as $\mathrm{coker}(J_{n})$, the cokernel of $J_{n}$. The remaining term in the short exact sequence, namely the group $bP_{n+1}$, denotes the $n$-dimensional homotopy spheres that bound an $n+1$-dimensional parallelizable manifold (note that in modern notation it has become customary to denote $bP_{n+1}$ by the symbol $\Theta_{n}^{bp}$, instead). Importantly, $bP_{n+1}$ has the additional property that it is trivial when $n$ is even. Finally, the case where $n \equiv 2 \pmod{4}$ has a slightly modified short exact sequence from the one given above, now involving the Kervaire invariant. Namely

$0\to bP_{4l+3} \to\Theta_{4k+2}\to \pi_{4k+2}^S/(\mathrm{Image}(J_{4k+2}))\xrightarrow{\Phi_{K}}\Z/2\to bP_{4k+2}\to 0\,$

where $\Phi_{K}$ is the Kervaire invariant. When the Kervaire invariant is zero, i.e. when $n\ne 6, 14, 30, 62,$ and $126$, then this exact sequence reduces to the original exact sequence given above, but also gives the result that $bP_{4k+2}=\Z/2$. Plugging this result into the original short exact sequence given above, this implies that $\Z/2$ is a subgroup of $\Theta_{4k+1}$ and therefore $\Theta_{4k+1}$ is nontrivial when the Kervaire invariant is zero for $n=4k+2$.

John Milnor solved the smooth case $n = 5$ in 1959 in the unpublished manuscript "Differentiable Manifolds Which Are Homotopy Spheres." The results of this manuscript were later incorporated in a larger and later (1963) paper where the smooth cases $n = 6$ and $n = 12$ were also solved. The $n = 5$ and $n = 6$ cases also follow from Smale's PL result, since the smooth and PL categories coincide for $n \le 6$.

Daniel Isaksen solved the smooth case $n = 56$ in 2014. This followed from his calculation of the stable homotopy group in dimension 56 being of order 2 (See page 4 in section 1.4 and Charts 8.1 and 8.17 in Stable Stems (2019) by Daniel C. Isaksen). Since the image of the J-Homomorphism in the Kervaire-Milnor short exact sequence is also of order 2, this shows that the cokernel of the J-homomorphism is trival. Since $bP_{57}$ is trivial (since $bP_{2n+1}$ is always trivial), $\Theta_{56}$ is therefore trivial. Consequently, the number of smooth structures on $S^{56}$ is one. Also, see Theorem 3.1.14 of Zhouli Xu's 2017 PhD thesis "In And Around Stable Homotopy Groups of Spheres." See also section 2 in the review article Stable Homotopy Groups Of Spheres and Motivic Homotopy Theory (2023) by Daniel C. Isaksen, Guozhen Wang, and Zhouli Xu.

Guozhen Wang and Zhouli Xu solved the smooth case $n = 61$ in 2017.

It was known from a theorem of Kervaire and Milnor (see Groups of Homotopy Spheres I (1963)) that the smooth Poincaré conjecture is always false for dimensions $n=4k+3 \,(k\ge 1)$. For dimensions $n=4k+1 \, (k\ge 1)$ the answer depends on the existence of Kervaire invariant elements. Due to work of Hill, Hopkins and Ravenel, it was thus known that the only odd dimensions where the smooth Poincaré conjecture could be true were in dimensions 1, 3, 5, 13, 29, 61, and 125. J. Peter May ruled out the case of $n=13$. The case $n=29$ was ruled out in the late 1960's by filling in the terms in the Kervaire-Milnor short exact sequence $0\to bP_{30} \to\Theta_{29}\to \pi_{29}^S/(\mathrm{Image}(J_{29}))\to 0\,$. J. Peter May showed in his PhD thesis that the only odd prime primary term in $\pi_{29}^S$, namely $p=3$, is equal to $\mathbb{Z}_{3}$. Mark Mahowald and Martin Tangora then showed that the 2-primary term was trivial. This established that the stable homotopy group in dimension 29 is of order 3. William Browder showed that $bP_{30}=0$ by establishing the existence of a framed manifold of Kervaire invariant 1 in dimension 30. Because the image of the J-homomorphism in dimension $29$, i.e., $J_{29} \colon \pi_{29}(\mathrm{SO}) \to \pi_{29}^S$, is trivial (because $\pi_{29}(\mathrm{SO})$ is trivial), the conclusion is that $\Theta_{29}=\mathbb{Z}_{3}$ and therefore there are three different smooth structures on $S^{29}$. Daniel Isaksen developed a more efficient and machine checkable method, namely motivic homotopy theory, that allowed calculations beyond $n=60$. The final case $n=125$ was finally ruled out by Guozhen Wang and Zhouli Xu by producing an explicit element of $\pi_{125}^S/(\mathrm{Image}(J_{125}))$ whose non-triviality is detected by the spectrum of topological modular forms (See Proposition 1.12 of their 2017 paper, "The Triviality of the 61-Stem in the Stable Homotopy Groups of Spheres"). Thus, it is now known that the only odd dimensions where the smooth Poincaré conjecture is true are 1, 3, 5, and 61.

The smooth case in even dimensions has been checked in all even dimensions through $n = 138$, with the exception of $n = 4$. So far, the only even dimensions where the smooth Poincaré conjecture has been found to be true are in dimensions $n = 2, 6, 12$ and $56$. In the even case, $\Theta_{2n} = \pi_{2n}^S/(\mathrm{Image}(J_{2n}))$ because $bP_{2n+1}=0$ in the Kervaire-Milnor short exact sequence, unless the Kervaire invariant is nonzero, in which case $\Theta_{2n}$ is a subgroup. Therefore determining all smooth structures on $S^{2n} \, (n>2)$ involves determining the structure of $\mathrm{cokernel}(J_{2n})\equiv \pi_{2n}^S/(\mathrm{Image}(J_{2n}))$. Disproving the Poincaré conjecture then amounts to finding a single nontrivial element in $\mathrm{cokernel}(J_{2n})$, with the caveat that the analysis is more complicated in the five even dimensions above $n=4$ where the Kervaire invariant is nonzero. The strategy has been to find nontrivial elements in low dimensions that are $\nu$-periodic, that is, that reappear every $\nu$ dimensions. So, if there is a nontrivial element in dimension $D$, then there are nontrivial elements in all dimensions $D+\nu k \, (k\ge0)$. In this way, many infinite sequences of dimensions can be ruled out.

== PL ==
For piecewise linear manifolds, the Poincaré conjecture is true except possibly in dimension 4, where the answer is unknown, and equivalent to the smooth case. In other words, every compact PL manifold of dimension not equal to 4 that is homotopy equivalent to a sphere is PL isomorphic to a sphere.

== See also ==
- (sequence A001676 in the OEIS)
