= Kervaire–Milnor group =

Abelian group, in mathematics

In mathematics, especially differential topology and cobordism theory, a Kervaire–Milnor group is an abelian group defined as the h-cobordism classes of homotopy spheres with the connected sum as composition and the reverse orientation as inversion. It controls the existence of smooth structures on topological and piecewise linear (PL) manifolds. Concerning the related question of PL structures on topological manifolds, the obstruction is given by the Kirby–Siebenmann invariant, which is a lot easier to understand. In all but three and four dimensions, Kervaire–Milnor groups furthermore give the possible smooth structures on spheres, hence exotic spheres. They are named after the French mathematician Michel Kervaire and the American mathematician John Milnor, who first described them in 1962. (Their paper was originally only supposed to be the first part, but a second part was never published.)

== Definition ==
An important property of spheres is their neutrality with respect to the connected sum of manifolds. Expanding this monoid structure with a composition and a neutral element to a group structure requires the restriction on manifolds, for which a connected sum can result in a sphere, hence which intuitively doesn't have holes. This is possible with homotopy spheres, which are closed smooth manifolds with the same homotopy type as a sphere, with restriction to h-cobordism classes being useful for application. Inversion is then given by changing their orientation, which results in a group structure.

An alternative definition in higher dimensions is given by the description of topological, PL and smooth structures. Let $\operatorname{Top}_n$ be the topological group of homeomorphisms, $\operatorname{PL}_n$ the topological group of PL homeomorphisms and $\operatorname{Diff}_n$ be the topological group of diffeomorphisms of euclidean space $\mathbb{R}^n$. An inductive limit yields topological groups $\operatorname{Top}$, $\operatorname{PL}$ and $\operatorname{Diff}$ (which is homotopy equivalent to the infinite orthogonal group $\operatorname{O}(\infty)$), for which classifying spaces can be regarded. For a topological manifold $X$, its tangent bundle $TX$ is also a topological manifold, which is classified by a continuous map $X\rightarrow\operatorname{BTop}$. Analogous for a PL and a smooth manifold, there are classifying maps $X\rightarrow\operatorname{BPL}$ and $X\rightarrow\operatorname{BDiff}$ respectively. The canonical inclusions $\operatorname{BDiff}\hookrightarrow\operatorname{BPL}\hookrightarrow\operatorname{BTop}$ show that every smooth is a PL and every PL is a topological structure.

The Kervaire–Milnor groups are then alternatively given by the homotopy groups of the quotient groups $\operatorname{PL}/\operatorname{Diff}$ and $\operatorname{Top}/\operatorname{Diff}$:

$$\Theta_n
\cong\pi_n\left(\operatorname{PL}/\operatorname{Diff}\right)
\cong\pi_n\left(\operatorname{Top}/\operatorname{Diff}\right)$$

for $n\geq 5$.

== Examples ==
Some low-dimensional Kervaire–Milnor groups are given by:

$$\Theta_1\cong 1$$
$$\Theta_2\cong 1$$
$$\Theta_3\cong 1$$
$$\Theta_4\cong 1$$
$$\Theta_5\cong 1$$
$$\Theta_6\cong 1$$
$$\Theta_7\cong\mathbb{Z}_{28}$$
$$\Theta_8\cong\mathbb{Z}_2$$
$$\Theta_9\cong\mathbb{Z}_2^2$$
$$\Theta_{10}\cong\mathbb{Z}_6$$
$$\Theta_{11}\cong\mathbb{Z}_{992}$$
$$\Theta_{14}\cong\mathbb{Z}_2$$
$$\Theta_{16}\cong\mathbb{Z}_2$$
$$\Theta_{61}\cong 1$$

After the construction of Milnor spheres in 1956, it was already known that Kervaire–Milnor groups don't have to be trivial with the more exact result $\Theta_7\cong\mathbb{Z}_{28}$ only having been concluded the following years. A generating exotic sphere was constructed by Egbert Brieskorn as special case of a Brieskorn manifold in 1966. It possesses more unique properties and is also called Gromoll–Meyer sphere.

It is still unknown (in 2025) whether exotic spheres exist in four dimensions with the result $\Theta_4\cong 1$ not allowing any conclusion about it. This is because Kervaire–Milnor groups also only describe the diffeomorphism classes of spheres for $n\neq 3,4$. Often, the set of diffeomorphism classes of homotopy spheres is denoted $\overline\Theta_n$ with the canonical forgetful map $\overline\Theta_n\rightarrow\Theta_n$ then being bijective for $n\neq 3,4$.

== Properties ==
- All Kervaire–Milnor groups are finite. Michel Kervaire and John Milnor already proved this in their original paper for $n\neq 3$ with the remaining case $n=3$ being solved by the proof of the Poincaré conjecture by Grigori Perelman.
- $\Theta_1$, $\Theta_3$, $\Theta_5$ and $\Theta_{61}$ are the only trivial Kervaire–Milnor groups in odd dimensions.

== Literature ==
- Kervaire, Michel; Milnor, John (1962-04-19). Groups of homotopy spheres: I (PDF). Annals of Mathematics. Vol. 77.
- Freed, Daniel; Uhlenbeck, Karen (1991). Instantons and Four-Manifolds. Mathematical Sciences Research Institute Publications. Vol. 1. New York: Springer New York, NY. doi:10.1007/978-1-4613-9703-8. ISBN 978-1-4613-9705-2.
- Lück, Wolfgang (2004-11-27). A Basic Introduction to Surgery Theory (PDF).
- Wang, Guozhen; Xu, Zhouli (2017), "The triviality of the 61-stem in the stable homotopy groups of spheres", Annals of Mathematics, 186 (2): 501–580, arXiv:1601.02184, doi:10.4007/annals.2017.186.2.3, MR 3702672, S2CID 119147703
