= Chronological calculus =

Chronological calculus is a formalism for the analysis of flows of non-autonomous dynamical systems. It was introduced by A. Agrachev and R. Gamkrelidze in the late 1970s. The scope of the formalism is to provide suitable tools to deal with non-commutative vector fields and represent their flows as infinite Volterra series. These series, at first introduced as purely formal expansions, are then shown to converge under some suitable assumptions.

== Operator representation of points, vector fields and diffeomorphisms ==
Let $M$ be a finite-dimensional smooth manifold.

Chronological calculus works by replacing a non-linear finite-dimensional object, the manifold $M$, with a linear infinite-dimensional one, the commutative algebra $C^\infty(M)$. This leads to the following identifications:

- Points $q\in M$ are identified with nontrivial algebra homomorphisms

$\hat{q}:C^\infty(M)\to\mathbb{R}$ defined by $\hat{q}(a)=a(q)$.

- Diffeomorphisms $P:M\to M$ are identified with $C^\infty(M)$-automorphisms $\hat{P}:C^\infty(M)\to C^\infty(M)$ defined by $(\hat{P}a)(q)=a(P(q))$.
- Tangent vectors $v\in T_q M$ are identified with linear functionals $\hat{v}:C^\infty(M)\to\mathbb{R}$ satisfying the Leibnitz rule $\hat{v}(ab)=\hat{v}(a)b(q)+a(q)\hat{v}(b)$ at $q$.
- Smooth vector fields $V\in\text{Vec}(M)$ are identified with linear operators $\hat{V}:C^\infty(M)\to C^\infty(M)$

satisfying the Leibnitz rule $\hat{V}(ab)=\hat{V}(a)b+a\hat{V}(b)$.

In this formalism, the tangent vector $V(P(q))$ is identified with the operator $q\circ P\circ V$.

We consider on $C^\infty(M)$ the Whitney topology, defined by the family of seminorms

$$\displaystyle{
\|a\|_{s,K}:=\sup\left\{\left|\frac{\partial^\alpha a}{\partial q^\alpha}(q)\right|\,\mid q\in K,\,\alpha\in\N^{{\rm dim}(M)},\;|\alpha|\leq s \right\},
}$$

Regularity properties of families of operators on $C^\infty(M)$ can be defined in the weak sense as follows: $t\to A_t$ satisfies a certain regularity property if the family $t\to A_t(a)$ satisfies the same property, for every $a\in C^\infty(M)$. A weak notion of convergence of operators on $C^\infty(M)$ can be defined similarly.

== Volterra expansion and right-chronological exponential ==
Consider a complete non-autonomous vector field $(t,q)\mapsto X_t(q)$ on $M$, smooth with respect to $q$ and measurable with respect to $t$. Solutions to $\dot q(t)=X_t(q(t))$, which in the operator formalism reads

| $\frac{d}{dt} q(t)=q(t)\circ X_t,$ | 1 |

define the flow of $X_t$, i.e., a family of diffeomorphisms $t\to P^t$, $P^0=\mathrm{Id}$. The flow satisfies the equation

| $\frac{d}{dt}P^t=P^t\circ X_t,\; P^0=\mathrm{Id}.$ | 2 |

Rewrite 2 as a Volterra integral equation $P^t=\mathrm{Id}+\int_0^t P^{\tau_1}\circ X_{\tau_1}d\tau_1$.

Iterating one more time the procedure, we arrive to

$$\begin{align}
P^t&=\mathrm{Id}+\int_0^t P^{\tau_1}\circ X_{\tau_1}d\tau_1=\mathrm{Id}+\int_0^t \left(\mathrm{Id}+\int_0^{\tau_1} P^{\tau_2}\circ X_{\tau_2}d\tau_2\right)\circ X_{\tau_1}d\tau_1\\
&=\mathrm{Id}+\int_0^t X_{\tau_1}d\tau_1+\int_0^t\int_0^{\tau_1}P^{\tau_2}\circ X_{\tau_2}\circ X_{\tau_1}d\tau_2d\tau_1.
\end{align}$$

In this way we justify the notation, at least on the formal level, for the right chronological exponential

| $P^t=\overrightarrow{\mathrm{exp}}\int_0^t X_\tau d\tau=\mathrm{Id}+\sum_{n=1}^{+\infty}\int\dots\int_{\Delta_n(t)}\ X_{\tau_n}\circ\dots\circ X_{\tau_1}d\tau_n\dots d\tau_1,$ | 3 |

where $\Delta_n(t)=\{(\tau_1,\dots,\tau_n)\in\mathbb R^n\,\mid\,0\leq \tau_1\leq\dots\leq \tau_n\leq t\}$ denotes the standard $n$-dimensional simplex.

Unfortunately, this series never converges on $C^\infty(M)$; indeed, as a consequence of Borel's lemma, there always exists a smooth function $a\in C^\infty(M)$ on which it diverges. Nonetheless, the partial sum

$$\displaystyle{
S_m(t)=\mathrm{Id}+\sum_{n=1}^{m}\int\dots\int_{\Delta_n(t)}\ X_{\tau_n}\circ\dots\circ X_{\tau_1}d\tau_n\dots d\tau_1
}$$

can be used to obtain the asymptotics of the right chronological exponential: indeed it can be proved that, for every $a\in C^\infty(M)$, $s\geq 0$ and $K\subset M$ compact, we have

| $\left\|\left(\overrightarrow{\mathrm{exp}}\int_0^tX_\tau d\tau-S_m(t)\right)(a)\right\|_{s,K}\leq Ce^{C\int_0^t\|X_\tau\|_{s,K'}d\tau}\frac{1}{m!}\left(\int_0^t\|X_\tau\|_{s+m-1,K'}d\tau\right)^m\|a\|_{s+m,K'},$ | 4 |

for some $C>0$, where $K'=\cup_{s\in [0,t]}P^s(K)$. Also, it can be proven that the asymptotic series $S_m(t)$ converges, as $m\to+\infty$, on any normed subspace $L\subset C^\infty(M)$ on which $X_t$ is well-defined and bounded, i.e.,

$$\displaystyle{
X_t(L)\subset L,\quad \|X_t\|_{L}:=\sup\left\{\|X_t(a)\|_{L}\,\mid\, a\in L,\,\|a\|_{L}\leq 1\right\}<+\infty.
}$$

Finally, it is worth remarking that an analogous discussion can be developed for the left chronological exponential $Q^t$, satisfying the differential equation

$$\displaystyle{
\frac{d}{dt}Q^t=X_t\circ Q^t,\; Q^0=\mathrm{Id}.
}$$

== Variation of constants formula ==
Consider the perturbed ODE

$$\displaystyle{
\frac{d}{dt}P^t=P^t\circ(X_t+Y_t),\quad P^0=\mathrm{Id}.
}$$

We would like to represent the corresponding flow, $P^t=\overrightarrow{\mathrm{exp}}\int_0^t(X_\tau+Y_\tau)d\tau$, as the composition of the original flow $\overrightarrow{\mathrm{exp}}\int_0^tX_\tau d\tau$ with a suitable perturbation, that is, we would like to write an expression of the form

$$\displaystyle{P^t=\overrightarrow{\mathrm{exp}}\int_0^t(X_\tau+Y_\tau)d\tau=R^t\circ \overrightarrow{\mathrm{exp}}\int_0^tX_\tau d\tau.}$$

To this end, we notice that the action of a diffeomorphism $S$ on $M$ on a smooth vector field $W$, expressed as a derivation on $C^\infty(M)$, is given by the formula

$$\displaystyle{
S_*W=S^{-1}\circ W\circ S=\mathrm{Ad}S^{-1}(W).
}$$

In particular, if $S^t=\overrightarrow{\mathrm{exp}}\int_0^t V_\tau d\tau$, we have

$$\begin{align}
\frac{d}{dt}(\mathrm{Ad}S^t) W&=\frac{d}{dt}S^t\circ W\circ S^{-t}=S^t\circ\left( V_t\circ W-W\circ V_t\right)\circ S^{-t}\\&=\mathrm{Ad}S^t[V_t,W]=(\mathrm{Ad}S^t)\mathrm{ad}V_tW.\end{align}$$

This justifies the notation

$$\displaystyle{
\mathrm{Ad}S^t=\overrightarrow{\mathrm{exp}}\int_0^t\mathrm{ad}V_\tau d\tau.
}$$

Now we write

$$\displaystyle{
\frac{d}{dt}P^t=P^t\circ(X_t+Y_t)=P^t\circ X_t+R^t\circ\overrightarrow{\mathrm{exp}}\int_0^tX_\tau d\tau\circ Y_t}$$

and

$$\displaystyle{\frac{d}{dt}P^t=\dot{R}^t\circ\overrightarrow{\mathrm{exp}}\int_0^tX_\tau d\tau+R^t\circ\overrightarrow{\mathrm{exp}}\int_0^tX_\tau d\tau\circ X_t=\dot{R}^t\circ\overrightarrow{\mathrm{exp}}\int_0^tX_\tau d\tau+P^t\circ X_t}$$

which implies that

$$\displaystyle{
\dot{R}^t=R^t\circ \left(\overrightarrow{\mathrm{exp}}\int_0^t\mathrm{ad}X_\tau d\tau\right) Y_t,\quad R^0=\mathrm{Id}.
}$$

Since this ODE has a unique solution, we can write

$$\displaystyle{
R^t=\overrightarrow{\mathrm{exp}}\int_0^t\left(\overrightarrow{\mathrm{exp}}\int_0^\tau\mathrm{ad}X_\theta d\theta\right) Y_\tau d\tau,}$$

and arrive to the final expression, called the variation of constants formula:

| $\overrightarrow{\mathrm{exp}}\int_0^t(X_\tau+Y_\tau)d\tau=\overrightarrow{\mathrm{exp}}\int_0^t\left(\overrightarrow{\mathrm{exp}}\int_0^\tau\mathrm{ad}X_\theta d\theta\right) Y_\tau d\tau\circ\overrightarrow{\mathrm{exp}}\int_0^tX_\tau d\tau.$ | 5 |

Finally, by virtue of the equality $(\mathrm{Ad}P)\overrightarrow{\mathrm{exp}}\int_0^tV_\tau d\tau=\overrightarrow{\mathrm{exp}}\int_0^t(\mathrm{Ad}P)V_\tau d\tau$, we obtain a second version of the variation of constants formula, with the unperturbed flow $\overrightarrow{\mathrm{exp}}\int_0^tX_\tau d\tau$ composed on the left, that is,

| $\overrightarrow{\mathrm{exp}}\int_0^t(X_\tau+Y_\tau)d\tau=\overrightarrow{\mathrm{exp}}\int_0^tX_\tau d\tau\circ\overrightarrow{\mathrm{exp}}\int_0^t\left(\overrightarrow{\mathrm{exp}}\int_t^\tau\mathrm{ad}X_\theta d\theta\right) Y_\tau d\tau.$ | 6 |

== Sources ==
- Agrachev, Andrei A.; Sachkov, Yuri L. (2004). "Elements of Chronological Calculus". Control Theory from the Geometric Viewpoint. Encyclopaedia of Mathematical Sciences. Vol. 84. Springer. ISBN 9783662064047.
- Agrachev, Andrei A.; Gamkrelidze, Revaz V. (1978). "Exponential representation of flows and a chronological enumeration. (Russian)". Mat. Sb. New Series. 107 (149): 467–532, 639.
- Agrachev, Andrei A.; Gamkrelidze, Revaz V. (1980). "Chronological algebras and nonstationary vector fields. (Russian)". Akad. Nauk SSSR, Vsesoyuz. Inst. Nauchn. i Tekhn. Informatsii. 11: 135–176.
- Kawski, Matthias; Sussmann, Héctor (1997). Noncommutative power series and formal Lie-algebraic techniques in nonlinear control theory. European Consort. Math. Indust. Teubner, Stuttgart. pp. 111–128.
- Kawski, Matthias (2002). The combinatorics of nonlinear controllability and noncommuting flows. ICTP Lect. Notes, VIII. Abdus Salam Int. Cent. Theoret. Phys., Trieste. pp. 223–311.
- Sarychev, Andrey V. (2006). "Lie extensions of nonlinear control systems". Journal of Mathematical Sciences. 135 (4): 3195–3223. doi:10.1007/s10958-006-0152-4.
