= Gromoll–Meyer sphere =

In mathematics, especially differential topology, the Gromoll–Meyer sphere is a special seven-dimensional exotic sphere with several unique properties. It is named after Detlef Gromoll and Wolfgang Meyer, who first described it in detail in 1974, although it was already found by John Milnor in 1956.

== Definition ==
=== Brieskorn sphere ===
In $\mathbb{C}^5$ consider the complex variety (Brieskorn manifold):

$$a^2+b^2+c^2+d^3+e^5=0.$$

A description of the Gromoll–Meyer sphere is the intersection of the above variety with a small sphere around the origin.

=== Lie group biquotient ===
The first symplectic group $\operatorname{Sp}(1)$ (isomorphic to $\operatorname{SU}(2)$) acts on the second symplectic group $\operatorname{Sp}(2)$ (isomorphic to $\operatorname{Spin}(5)$) with the embedding $\operatorname{Sp}(1)\hookrightarrow\operatorname{Sp}(2), q\mapsto\operatorname{diag}(q,q)$ and multiplication from the left as well as the embedding $\operatorname{Sp}(1)\hookrightarrow\operatorname{Sp}(2), q\mapsto\operatorname{diag}(q,1)$ and multiplication from the right. A description of the Gromoll–Meyer sphere is the biquotient space:

$$\operatorname{Sp}(1)\backslash\operatorname{Sp}(2)/\operatorname{Sp}(1).$$

== Properties ==
- It is the only seven-dimensional exotic sphere which can be expressed as a biquotient of a compact Lie group.
- It can be expressed as a $S^3$-fiber bundle over $S^4$ and hence is a Milnor sphere. Such bundles also include the quaternionic Hopf fibration, whose total space is the ordinary $S^7$.
- It generates the seventh Kervaire–Milnor group $\Theta_7\cong\mathbb{Z}_{28}$.

== Literature ==
- Gromoll, Detlef; Meyer, Wolfgang (1974). "An Exotic Sphere With Nonnegative Sectional Curvature". Annals of Mathematics. Second Series. 100 (2): 401–406. doi:10.2307/1971078. JSTOR 1971078.
- Kapovitch, Vitali; Ziller, Wolfgang (2002-10-16). "Biquotients with singly generated rational cohomology". arXiv:math/0210231.
- Eschenburg, Jost-Hinrich; Kerin, Martin (2007-11-19). "Almost positive curvature on the Gromoll-Meyer sphere". arXiv:0711.2987 [math.DG].
- Sperança, Llohann D. (2010-10-28). "Pulling back the Gromoll-Meyer construction and models of exotic spheres". arXiv:1010.6039 [math.DG].
- Berman, David S.; Cederwall, Martin; Gherardini, Tancredi Schettini (2025). "Curvature of an exotic 7-sphere". Journal of Geometry and Physics. 216 105590. arXiv:2410.01909. Bibcode:2025JGP...21605590B. doi:10.1016/j.geomphys.2025.105590.
