= Microbundle =

Generalization of the concept of vector bundle

In mathematics, a microbundle is a generalization of the concept of vector bundle, introduced by the American mathematician John Milnor in 1964. It allows the creation of bundle-like objects in situations where they would not ordinarily be thought to exist. For example, the tangent bundle is defined for a smooth manifold but not a topological manifold; use of microbundles allows the definition of a topological tangent bundle.

== Definition ==
A (topological) $n$-microbundle over a topological space $B$ (the "base space") consists of a triple $(E, i, p)$, where $E$ is a topological space (the "total space"), $i: B \to E$ and $p: E \to B$ are continuous maps (respectively, the "zero section" and the "projection map") such that:

1. the composition $p \circ i$ is the identity of $B$;
2. for every $b \in B$, there is a neighborhood $U \subseteq B$ of $b$ and a neighbourhood $V \subseteq E$ of $i(b)$ such that $i(U) \subseteq V$, $p(V) \subseteq U$, $V$ is homeomorphic to $U\times \R^n$ and the maps $p_{\mid V}: V \to U$ and $i_{\mid U}: U \to V$ commute with $\mathrm{pr}_1: U \times \mathbb{R}^n \to U$ and $U \to U \times \mathbb{R}^n, x \mapsto (x,0)$.

In analogy with vector bundles, the integer $n \geq 0$ is also called the rank or the fibre dimension of the microbundle. Similarly, note that the first condition suggests $i$ should be thought of as the zero section of a vector bundle, while the second mimics the local triviality condition on a bundle. An important distinction here is that "local triviality" for microbundles only holds near a neighborhood of the zero section. The space $E$ could look very wild away from that neighborhood. Also, the maps gluing together locally trivial patches of the microbundle may only overlap the fibers.

The definition of microbundle can be adapted to other categories more general than the smooth one, such as that of piecewise linear manifolds, by replacing topological spaces and continuous maps by suitable objects and morphisms.

== Examples ==
- Any vector bundle $p: E \to B$ of rank $n$ has an obvious underlying $n$-microbundle, where $i$ is the zero section.
- Given any topological space $B$, the cartesian product $B \times \mathbb{R}^n$ (together with the projection on $B$ and the map $x \mapsto (x,0)$) defines an $n$-microbundle, called the standard trivial microbundle of rank $n$. Equivalently, it is the underlying microbundle of the trivial vector bundle of rank $n$.
- Given a topological manifold of dimension $n$, the cartesian product $M\times M$ together with the projection on the first component and the diagonal map $\Delta: M\to M\times M$ defines an $n$-microbundle, called the tangent microbundle of $M$.
- Given an $n$-microbundle $(E, i, p)$ over $B$, a subspace $A \subseteq B$, and a continuous map $f: A \to B$, the space $f^*E := \{ (a,e) \in A \times E \mid f(a)=p(e) \}$ defines an $n$-microbundle over $A$, called the pullback (or induced) microbundle by $f$, together with the projection $p:= \mathrm{pr}_1: f^*E \to A$ and the zero section $i: A \to f^*E, x \mapsto (x, (i \circ f)(x))$. If $p: E \to B$ is a vector bundle, the pullback microbundle of its underlying microbundle is precisely the underlying microbundle of the standard pullback bundle.
- Given an $n$-microbundle $(E, i, p)$ over $B$ and a subspace $A \subseteq B$, the restricted microbundle, also denoted by $E_{\mid A} = p^{-1}(A)$, is the pullback microbundle with respect to the inclusion $A \hookrightarrow B$.

== Morphisms ==
Two $n$-microbundles $(E_1, i_1, p_1)$ and $(E_2, i_2, p_2)$ over the same space $B$ are isomorphic (or equivalent) if there exist a neighborhood $V_1 \subseteq E_1$ of $i_1(B)$ and a neighborhood $V_2 \subseteq E_2$ of $i_2(B)$, together with a homeomorphism $V_1 \cong V_2$ commuting with the projections and the zero sections.

More generally, a morphism between microbundles consists of a germ of continuous maps $V_1 \to V_2$ between neighbourhoods of the zero sections as above.

An $n$-microbundle is called trivial if it is isomorphic to the standard trivial microbundle of rank $n$. The local triviality condition in the definition of microbundle can therefore be restated as follows: for every $b \in B$ there is a neighbourhood $U \subseteq B$ such that the restriction $E_{\mid U}$ is trivial.

Analogously to parallelisable smooth manifolds, a topological manifold is called topologically parallelisable if its tangent microbundle is trivial.

== Properties ==
A theorem of James Kister and Barry Mazur states that there is a neighborhood of the zero section which is actually a fiber bundle with fiber $\R^n$ and structure group $\operatorname{Homeo}(\R^n,0)$, the group of homeomorphisms of $\R^n$ fixing the origin. This neighborhood is unique up to isotopy. Thus every microbundle can be refined to an actual fiber bundle in an essentially unique way.

Taking the fiber bundle contained in the tangent microbundle $(M\times M, \Delta, \mathrm{pr})$ gives the topological tangent bundle. Intuitively, this bundle is obtained by taking a system of small charts for $M$, letting each chart $U$ have a fiber $U$ over each point in the chart, and gluing these trivial bundles together by overlapping the fibers according to the transition maps.

Microbundle theory is an integral part of the work of Robion Kirby and Laurent C. Siebenmann on smooth structures and PL structures on higher dimensional manifolds.
