= Homotopy sphere =

Concept in algebraic topology

In algebraic topology, a branch of mathematics, a homotopy sphere is an n-manifold that is homotopy equivalent to the n-sphere. It thus has the same homotopy groups and the same homology groups as the n-sphere, and so every homotopy sphere is necessarily a homology sphere.

The topological generalized Poincaré conjecture is that any n-dimensional homotopy sphere is homeomorphic to the n-sphere; it was solved by Stephen Smale in dimensions five and higher, by Michael Freedman in dimension 4, and for dimension 3 (the original Poincaré conjecture) by Grigori Perelman in 2005.

In the case of smooth manifolds, in certain dimensions there exist homotopy spheres that are not diffeomorphic to the sphere, called exotic spheres. The smooth Poincaré conjecture, whether such non-trivial smooth homotopy spheres exist, is open in dimension 4.

Homotopy spheres form an abelian group known as Kervaire–Milnor group. Its composition is the connected sum and its neutral element is the sphere, while inversion is given by opposite orientation.

== See also ==
- Homology sphere
- Homotopy groups of spheres
- Poincaré conjecture
