= Milnor number =

Invariant that plays a role in algebraic geometry and singularity theory

In mathematics, and particularly singularity theory, the Milnor number, named after John Milnor, is an invariant of a function germ.

If f is a complex-valued holomorphic function germ then the Milnor number of f, denoted μ(f), is either a nonnegative integer, or is infinite. It can be considered both a geometric invariant and an algebraic invariant. This is why it plays an important role in algebraic geometry and singularity theory.

== Algebraic definition ==
Consider a holomorphic complex function germ

$$f : (\mathbb{C}^n,0) \to (\mathbb{C},0) \$$

and denote by $\mathcal{O}_n$ the ring of all function germs $(\mathbb{C}^n,0) \to (\mathbb{C},0)$. Every level of a function is a complex hypersurface in $\mathbb{C}^n$, therefore $f$ is dubbed a hypersurface singularity.

Assume it is an isolated singularity: in the case of holomorphic mappings it is said that a hypersurface singularity $f$ is singular at $0 \in \mathbb{C}^n$ if its gradient $\nabla f$ is zero at $0$, and it is said that $0$ is an isolated singular point if it is the only singular point in a sufficiently small neighbourhood of $0$. In particular, the multiplicity of the gradient

$$\mu(f) = \dim_{\mathbb{C}} \mathcal{O}_n/\nabla f$$

is finite by an application of Rückert's Nullstellensatz. This number $\mu(f)$ is the Milnor number of singularity $f$ at $0$.

Note that the multiplicity of the gradient is finite if and only if the origin is an isolated critical point of f.

== Geometric interpretation ==
Milnor originally introduced $\mu(f)$ in geometric terms in the following way. All fibers $f^{-1}(c)$ for values $c$ close to $0$ are nonsingular manifolds of real dimension $2(n-1)$. Their intersection with a small open disc $D_{\epsilon}$ centered at $0$ is a smooth manifold $F$ called the Milnor fiber. Up to diffeomorphism $F$ does not depend on $c$ or $\epsilon$ if they are small enough. It is also diffeomorphic to the fiber of the Milnor fibration map.

The Milnor fiber $F$ is a smooth manifold of dimension $2(n-1)$ and has the same homotopy type as a bouquet of $\mu(f)$ spheres $S^{n-1}$. This is to say that its middle Betti number $b_{n-1}(F)$ is equal to the Milnor number and it has homology of a point in dimension less than $n-1$. For example, a complex plane curve near every singular point $z_0$ has its Milnor fiber homotopic to a wedge of $\mu_{z_0}(f)$ circles (Milnor number is a local property, so it can have different values at different singular points).

Thus the following equalities hold:

Milnor number = number of spheres in the wedge = middle Betti number of $F$ = degree of the map $z\to \frac{{\nabla} f(z)}{\|{\nabla} f(z)\|}$ on $S_\epsilon$ = multiplicity of the gradient $\nabla f$

Another way of looking at Milnor number is by perturbation. It is said that a point is a degenerate singular point, or that f has a degenerate singularity, at $z_0 \in \mathbb{C}^n$ if $z_0$ is a singular point and the Hessian matrix of all second order partial derivatives has zero determinant at $z_0$:

$$\det\left( \frac{\partial^2 f}{\partial z_i \partial z_j} \right)_{1 \le i \le j \le n}^{z = z_0} =0.$$

It is assumed that f has a degenerate singularity at 0. The multiplicity of this degenerate singularity may be considered by thinking about how many points are infinitesimally glued. If the image of f is now perturbed in a certain stable way the isolated degenerate singularity at 0 will split up into other isolated singularities which are non-degenerate. The number of such isolated non-degenerate singularities will be the number of points that have been infinitesimally glued.

Precisely, another function germ g which is non-singular at the origin is taken and considered the new function germ h := f + εg where ε is very small. When ε = 0 then h = f. The function h is called the morsification of f. It is very difficult to compute the singularities of h, and indeed it may be computationally impossible. This number of points that have been infinitesimally glued, this local multiplicity of f, is exactly the Milnor number of f.

Further contributions give meaning to Milnor number in terms of dimension of the space of versal deformations, i.e. the Milnor number is the minimal dimension of parameter space of deformations that carry all information about initial singularity.

== Examples ==
Given below are some worked examples of polynomials in two variables. Working with only a single variable is too simple and does not give an appropriate illustration of the techniques, whereas working with three variables can be cumbersome. Note that if f is only holomorphic and not a polynomial, then the power series expansion of f can be used.

=== 1 ===
Consider a function germ with a non-degenerate singularity at 0, say $f(x,y) = x^2 + y^2$. The Jacobian ideal is just $\langle 2x, 2y \rangle = \langle x, y \rangle$. Computing the local algebra:

$$\mathcal{A}_f = \mathcal{O} / \langle x, y \rangle = \langle 1 \rangle .$$

Hadamard's lemma, which says that any function $h\in\mathcal{O}$ may be written as

$$h(x,y) = k + xh_1(x,y) + yh_2(x,y)$$

for some constant k and functions $h_1$ and $h_2$ in $\mathcal{O}$ (where either $h_1$ or $h_2$ or both may be exactly zero), justifies this. So, modulo functional multiples of x and y, the function h may be written as a constant. The space of constant functions is spanned by 1, hence $\mathcal{A}_f = \langle 1 \rangle$

It follows that μ(f) = 1. It is easy to check that for any function germ g with a non-degenerate singularity at 0, μ(g) = 1.

Note that applying this method to a non-singular function germ g yields μ(g) = 0.

=== 2 ===
Let $f(x,y) = x^3 + xy^2$, then

$$\mathcal{A}_f = \mathcal{O} / \langle 3x^2 + y^2, xy \rangle = \langle 1, x, y, x^2 \rangle .$$

So in this case $\mu(f) = 4$.

=== 3 ===
It may be shown that if $f(x,y) = x^2y^2 + y^3$ then $\mu(f) = \infty.$

This can be explained by the fact that f is singular at every point of the x-axis.

== Versal deformations ==
Let f have finite Milnor number μ, and let $g_1,\ldots, g_{\mu}$ be a basis for the local algebra, considered as a vector space. Then a miniversal deformation of f is given by

$$F : (\mathbb{C}^n \times \mathbb{C}^{\mu},0) \to (\mathbb{C},0) ,$$
$$F(z,a) := f(z) + a_1g_1(z) + \cdots + a_{\mu}g_{\mu}(z) ,$$

where $(a_1,\dots,a_{\mu})\in \mathbb{C}^{\mu}$. These deformations (or unfoldings) are of great interest in much of science.

== Invariance ==
Function germs can be collected together to construct equivalence classes. One standard equivalence is A-equivalence. It is said that two function germs $f,g : (\mathbb{C}^n,0) \to (\mathbb{C},0)$ are A-equivalent if there exist diffeomorphism germs $\phi : (\mathbb{C}^n,0) \to (\mathbb{C}^n,0)$ and $\psi : (\mathbb{C},0) \to (\mathbb{C},0)$ such that $f \circ \phi = \psi \circ g$: there exists a diffeomorphic change of variable in both domain and range which takes f to g. If f and g are A-equivalent then μ(f) = μ(g).

Nevertheless, the Milnor number does not offer a complete invariant for function germs, i.e. the converse is false: there exist function germs f and g with μ(f) = μ(g) which are not A-equivalent. To see this consider $f(x,y) = x^3+y^3$ and $g(x,y) = x^2+y^5$. This yields $\mu(f) = \mu(g) = 4$ but f and g are clearly not A-equivalent since the Hessian matrix of f is equal to zero while that of g is not (and the rank of the Hessian is an A-invariant, as is easy to see).
