= Unfolding (functions) =

Family of mathematical functions

In mathematics, an unfolding of a smooth real-valued function ƒ on a smooth manifold is a certain family of functions that includes ƒ.

== Definition ==
Let $M$ be a smooth manifold and consider a smooth mapping $f : M \to \mathbb{R}.$ Let us assume that for given $x_0 \in M$ and $y_0 \in \mathbb{R}$ we have $f(x_0) = y_0$. Let $N$ be a smooth $k$-dimensional manifold, and consider the family of mappings (parameterised by $N$) given by $F : M \times N \to \mathbb{R} .$ We say that $F$ is a $k$-parameter unfolding of $f$ if $F(x,0) = f(x)$ for all $x.$ In other words the functions $f : M \to \mathbb{R}$ and $F : M \times \{0\} \to \mathbb{R}$ are the same: the function $f$ is contained in, or is unfolded by, the family $F.$

== Example ==
Let $f : \mathbb{R}^2 \to \mathbb{R}$ be given by $f(x,y) = x^2 + y^5.$ An example of an unfolding of $f$ would be $F : \mathbb{R}^2 \times \mathbb{R}^3 \to \mathbb{R}$ given by

$$F((x,y),(a,b,c)) = x^2 + y^5 + ay + by^2 + cy^3.$$

As is the case with unfoldings, $x$ and $y$ are called variables, and $a,$ $b,$ and $c$ are called parameters, since they parameterise the unfolding.

== Well-behaved unfoldings ==
In practice we require that the unfoldings have certain properties. In $\mathbb{R}$, $f$ is a smooth mapping from $M$ to $\mathbb{R}$ and so belongs to the function space $C^{\infty}(M,\mathbb{R}).$ As we vary the parameters of the unfolding, we get different elements of the function space. Thus, the unfolding induces a function $\Phi : N \to C^{\infty}(M,\mathbb{R}).$ The space $\operatorname{diff}(M) \times \operatorname{diff}(\mathbb{R})$, where $\operatorname{diff}(M)$ denotes the group of diffeomorphisms of $M$ etc., acts on $C^{\infty}(M,\mathbb{R}).$ The action is given by $(\phi,\psi) \cdot f = \psi \circ f \circ \phi^{-1}.$ If $g$ lies in the orbit of $f$ under this action then there is a diffeomorphic change of coordinates in $M$ and $\mathbb{R}$, which takes $g$ to $f$ (and vice versa). One property that we can impose is that

$$\operatorname{Im}(\Phi) \pitchfork \operatorname{orb}(f)$$

where "$\pitchfork$" denotes "transverse to". This property ensures that as we vary the unfolding parameters we can predict – by knowing how the orbit foliates $C^\infty (M,\mathbb{R})$ – how the resulting functions will vary.

== Versal unfoldings ==
There is an idea of a versal unfolding. Every versal unfolding has the property that $\operatorname{Im}(\Phi) \pitchfork \operatorname{orb}(f)$, but the converse is false. Let $x_1,\ldots,x_n$ be local coordinates on $M$, and let $\mathcal{O}(x_1,\ldots,x_n)$ denote the ring of smooth functions. We define the Jacobian ideal of $f$, denoted by $J_f$, as follows:

$$J_f := \left\langle \frac{\partial f}{\partial x_1}, \ldots, \frac{\partial f}{\partial x_n} \right\rangle.$$

Then a basis for a versal unfolding of $f$ is given by the quotient

$$\frac{\mathcal{O}(x_1,\ldots,x_n)}{J_f}$$.

This quotient is known as the local algebra of $f$. The dimension of the local algebra is called the Milnor number of $f$. The minimum number of unfolding parameters for a versal unfolding is equal to the Milnor number; that is not to say that every unfolding with that many parameters will be versal. Consider the function $f(x,y) = x^2 + y^5$. A calculation shows that

$$\frac{\mathcal{O}(x,y)}{\langle 2x, 5y^4 \rangle} = \{y,y^2,y^3\} \ .$$

This means that $\{y,y^2,y^3\}$ give a basis for a versal unfolding, and that

$$F((x,y),(a,b,c)) = x^2 + y^5 + ay + by^2 + cy^3$$

is a versal unfolding. A versal unfolding with the minimum possible number of unfolding parameters is called a miniversal unfolding.

== Bifurcations sets of unfoldings ==
An important object associated to an unfolding is its bifurcation set. This set lives in the parameter space of the unfolding, and gives all parameter values for which the resulting function has degenerate singularities.

== Other terminology ==
Sometimes unfoldings are called deformations, versal unfoldings are called versal deformations, etc.
