= A-equivalence =

Equivalence relation between map germs

In mathematics, $\mathcal{A}$-equivalence, sometimes called right-left equivalence, is an equivalence relation between map germs.

Let $M$ and $N$ be two manifolds, and let $f, g : (M,x) \to (N,y)$ be two smooth map germs. We say that $f$ and $g$ are $\mathcal{A}$-equivalent if there exist diffeomorphism germs $\phi : (M,x) \to (M,x)$ and $\psi : (N,y) \to (N,y)$ such that $\psi \circ f = g \circ \phi.$

In other words, two map germs are $\mathcal{A}$-equivalent if one can be taken onto the other by a diffeomorphic change of co-ordinates in the source (i.e. $M$) and the target (i.e. $N$).

Let $\Omega(M_x,N_y)$ denote the space of smooth map germs $(M,x) \to (N,y).$ Let $\mbox{diff}(M_x)$ be the group of diffeomorphism germs $(M,x) \to (M,x)$ and $\mbox{diff}(N_y)$ be the group of diffeomorphism germs $(N,y) \to (N,y).$ The group $G := \mbox{diff}(M_x) \times \mbox{diff}(N_y)$ acts on $\Omega(M_x,N_y)$ in the natural way: $(\phi,\psi) \cdot f = \psi^{-1} \circ f \circ \phi.$ Under this action we see that the map germs $f, g : (M,x) \to (N,y)$ are $\mathcal{A}$-equivalent if, and only if, $g$ lies in the orbit of $f$, i.e. $g \in \mbox{orb}_G(f)$ (or vice versa).

A map germ is called stable if its orbit under the action of $G := \mbox{diff}(M_x) \times \mbox{diff}(N_y)$ is open relative to the Whitney topology. Since $\Omega(M_x,N_y)$ is an infinite dimensional space metric topology is no longer trivial. Whitney topology compares the differences in successive derivatives and gives a notion of proximity within the infinite dimensional space. A base for the open sets of the topology in question is given by taking $k$-jets for every $k$ and taking open neighbourhoods in the ordinary Euclidean sense. Open sets in the topology are then unions of these base sets.

Consider the orbit of some map germ $orb_G(f).$ The map germ $f$ is called simple if there are only finitely many other orbits in a neighbourhood of each of its points. Vladimir Arnold has shown that the only simple singular map germs $(\mathbb{R}^n,0) \to (\mathbb{R},0)$ for $1 \le n \le 3$ are the infinite sequence $A_k$ ($k \in \mathbb{N}$), the infinite sequence $D_{4+k}$ ($k \in \mathbb{N}$), $E_6,$ $E_7,$ and $E_8.$

== See also ==
- K-equivalence (contact equivalence)
