= Soul theorem =

Mathematical theorem on complete manifolds

In mathematics, the soul theorem is a theorem of Riemannian geometry that largely reduces the study of complete manifolds of non-negative sectional curvature to that of the compact case. Jeff Cheeger and Detlef Gromoll proved the theorem in 1972 by generalizing a 1969 result of Gromoll and Wolfgang Meyer. The related soul conjecture, formulated by Cheeger and Gromoll at that time, was proved twenty years later by Grigori Perelman.

== Soul theorem ==
Cheeger and Gromoll's soul theorem states:

If (M, g) is a complete connected and non compact Riemannian manifold with nonnegative sectional curvature, then there exists a closed totally convex, totally geodesic embedded submanifold whose normal bundle is diffeomorphic to M.

Such a submanifold is called a soul of (M, g). By the Gauss equation and total geodesicity, the induced Riemannian metric on the soul automatically has nonnegative sectional curvature. Gromoll and Meyer had earlier studied the case of positive sectional curvature, where they showed that a soul is given by a single point, and hence that M is diffeomorphic to Euclidean space.

Very simple examples, as below, show that the soul is not uniquely determined by (M, g) in general. However, Vladimir Sharafutdinov constructed a 1-Lipschitz retraction from M to any of its souls, thereby showing that any two souls are isometric. This mapping is known as Sharafutdinov's retraction.

Cheeger and Gromoll also posed the converse question of whether there is a complete Riemannian metric of nonnegative sectional curvature on the total space of any vector bundle over a closed manifold of positive sectional curvature. The answer is now known to be negative, although the existence theory is not fully understood.

Examples.

- As can be seen directly from the definition, every compact manifold is its own soul. For this reason, the theorem is often stated only for non-compact manifolds.
- As a very simple example, take M to be Euclidean space R^{n}. The sectional curvature is 0 everywhere, and any point of M can serve as a soul of M.
- Now take the paraboloid M = {(x, y, z) : z = x^{2} + y^{2}}, with the metric g being the ordinary Euclidean distance coming from the embedding of the paraboloid in Euclidean space R^{3}. Here the sectional curvature is positive everywhere, though not constant. The origin (0, 0, 0) is a soul of M. Not every point x of M is a soul of M, since there may be geodesic loops based at x, in which case $\{x\}$ wouldn't be totally convex.
- One can also consider an infinite cylinder M = {(x, y, z) : x^{2} + y^{2} = 1}, again with the induced Euclidean metric. The sectional curvature is 0 everywhere. Any "horizontal" circle {(x, y, z) : x^{2} + y^{2} = 1} with fixed z is a soul of M. Non-horizontal cross sections of the cylinder are not souls since they are neither totally convex nor totally geodesic.

== Soul conjecture ==
As mentioned above, Gromoll and Meyer proved that if g has positive sectional curvature then the soul is a point. Cheeger and Gromoll conjectured that this would hold even if g had nonnegative sectional curvature, with positivity only required of all sectional curvatures at a single point. This soul conjecture was proved by Grigori Perelman, who established the more powerful fact that Sharafutdinov's retraction is a Riemannian submersion, and even a submetry.
