= Francis Bonahon =

French mathematician (born 1955)

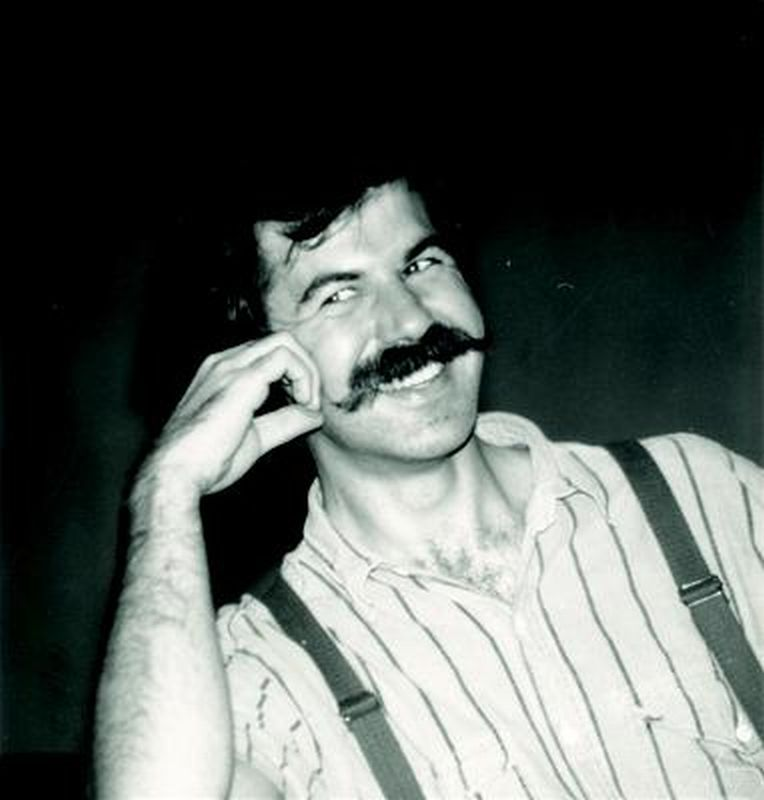
Francis Bonahon, Oberwolfach 1987

Francis Bonahon (born 9 September 1955) is a French mathematician, specializing in low-dimensional topology.

== Biography ==
Bonahon received in 1972 his baccalauréat, and was accepted in 1974 into the École Normale Supérieure. He received in 1975 his maîtrise in mathematics from the University of Paris VII, and in 1979 his doctorate from the University of Paris XI under Laurence Siebenmann with thesis Involutions et fibrés de Seifert dans les variétés de dimension 3. As a postdoc he was for the academic year 1979/80 a Procter Fellow at Princeton University. In 1980 he became an attaché de recherche and in 1983 a chargé de recherche of the CNRS. In 1985 he received his habilitation from the University of Paris XI under Siebenmann with thesis Geometric structures on 3-manifolds and applications. Bonahon became in 1986 an assistant professor, in 1988 an associate professor, and in 1989 a full professor at the University of Southern California in Los Angeles.

He was a visiting professor in 1990 at the University of California, Davis, in 1996 at the Centre Émile Borel and at the IHES, in 1997 at Caltech, in 2000 at IHES, and in 2015 at the MSRI.

Bonahon's research deals with three-dimensional topology, knot theory, surface diffeomorphisms, hyperbolic geometry, and Kleinian groups.

He received in 1985 a bronze medal from CNRS and from 1989 to 1994 a Presidential Young Investigator Award. From 1987 to 1989 he was a Sloan Research Fellow. In 1990 he was an Invited Speaker with talk Ensembles limites et applications at the ICM in Kyoto. He was elected a Fellow of American Mathematical Society in 2012.

His doctoral students include Frédéric Paulin.

== Selected publications ==
- Low dimensional geometry: from euclidean surfaces to hyperbolic knots. Student Mathematical Library, American Mathematical Society 2009. ISBN 978-0-8218-4816-6
- Geodesic laminations on surfaces, in M. Lyubich, John Milnor, Yair Minsky (eds.) Laminations and Foliations in Dynamics, Geometry and Topology, Contemporary Mathematics 269, 2001, 1–38.
- Geometric Structures on 3-manifolds, in R. J. Daverman, R. B. Sher (eds.) Handbook of Geometric Topology, North Holland 2002, pp. 93–164.
- as editor with Robert Devaney, Frederick Gardiner, and Dragomir Saric: Conformal Dynamics and Hyperbolic Geometry, Contemporary Mathematics 573, AMS, 2012
- Difféotopies des espaces lenticulaires, Topology 22, 1983, 305–314
- Cobordism of automorphism of surfaces, Annales ENS, 16, 1983, 237–270
- with Laurence Siebenmann: The classification of Seifert fibered 3-orbifolds, in R. Fenn (ed.) Low Dimensional Topology, Cambridge University Press, 1985, pp. 19–85
- Bouts des variétés hyperboliques de dimension 3, Annals of Mathematics, vol. 124, 1986, pp. 71–158 doi:10.2307/1971388
- The geometry of Teichmüller space via geodesic currents, Inventiones Mathematicae, vol. 92, 1988, 139–162
- Earthquakes on Riemann surfaces and on measured geodesic laminations, Amer. Math. Soc. vol. 330, 1992, 69–95 doi:10.1090/S0002-9947-1992-1049611-3
- Shearing hyperbolic surfaces, bending pleated surfaces and Thurston's symplectic form. Ann. Fac. Sci. Toulouse Math. (6) 5 (1996), no. 2, 233–297.
- with Jean-Pierre Otal: Laminations mesurées de plissage des variétés hyperboliques de dimension 3, Annals of Mathematics 113, 2004, 1013–1055. JSTOR 3597331
- Kleinian groups which are almost fuchsian, J. Reine. Angew. Mathematik, vol. 587, 2005, pp. 1–15 arXiv.org preprint
- with X. Liu Representations of the quantum Teichmüller space, and invariants of surface diffeomorphisms, Geometry and Topology, vol. 11, 2007, pp. 889–937. arXiv.org preprint
- with Guillaume Dreyer: Parameterizing Hitchin components. Duke Math. J. 163 (2014), no. 15, 2935–2975. arXiv.org preprint
- with Helen Wong: Representations of the Kauffman bracket skein algebra I: invariants and miraculous cancellations. Invent. Math. 204 (2016), no. 1, 195–243. arXiv.org preprint
