= K-equivalence =

Mathematical equivalence relation

In mathematics, $\mathcal{K}$-equivalence, or contact equivalence, is an equivalence relation between map germs. It was introduced by John Mather in his seminal work in Singularity theory in the 1960s as a technical tool for studying stable maps. Since then it has proved important in its own right. Roughly speaking, two map germs ƒ, g are $\scriptstyle\mathcal{K}$-equivalent if ƒ^{−1}(0) and g^{−1}(0) are diffeomorphic.

== Definition ==
Two map germs $f,g:X \to (Y,0)$ are $\scriptstyle\mathcal{K}$-equivalent if there is a diffeomorphism

$$\Psi: X \times Y \to X\times Y$$

of the form Ψ(x,y) = (φ(x),ψ(x,y)), satisfying,

$\Psi(x,0) = (\varphi(x), 0)$, and
$$\Psi(x,f(x)) = (\varphi(x), g(\varphi(x)))$$.

In other words, &Psi. Maps the graph of f to the graph of g, as well as the graph of the zero map to itself. In particular, the diffeomorphism φ maps f^{−1}(0) to g^{−1}(0). The name contact is explained by the fact that this equivalence is measuring the contact between the graph of f and the graph of the zero map.

Contact equivalence is the appropriate equivalence relation for studying the sets of solutions of equations, and finds many applications in dynamical systems and bifurcation theory, for example.

It is easy to see that this equivalence relation is weaker than A-equivalence, in that any pair of $\scriptstyle\mathcal{A}$-equivalent map germs are necessarily $\scriptstyle\mathcal{K}$-equivalent.

== K_{V}-equivalence ==
This modification of $\scriptstyle\mathcal{K}$-equivalence was introduced by James Damon in the 1980s. Here V is a subset (or subvariety) of Y, and the diffeomorphism Ψ above is required to preserve not $X\times\{0\}$ but $X\times V$ (that is, $y\in V \Rightarrow \psi(x,y)\in V$). In particular, Ψ maps f^{−1}(V) to g^{−1}(V).

== See also ==
- A-equivalence
