= Frédéric Pham =

Vietnamese-French mathematician and mathematical physicist (born 1938)

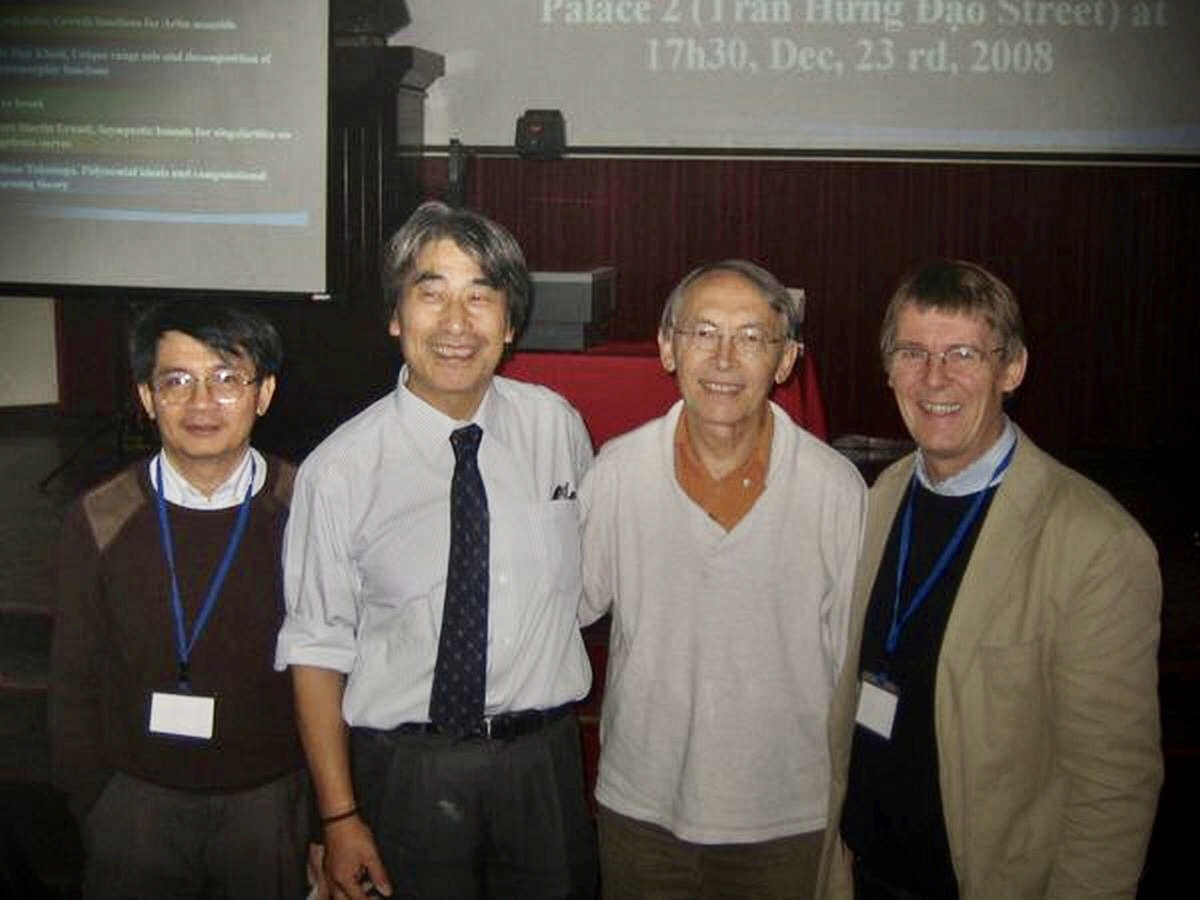
from left: Ngô Việt Trung, Kyoji Saito, Frédéric Pham, Gert-Martin Greuel, Dalat 2008

Frédéric Pham (born 17 November 1938 in Saigon) is a Vietnamese-French mathematician and mathematical physicist. He is known for the Brieskorn-Pham manifolds (explicit examples of exotic spheres).

== Education and career ==
Pham studied from 1957 to 1959 at the École polytechnique. From 1961 to 1969 he worked at Saclay Nuclear Research Centre, where he developed his doctoral thesis. In addition, during those years, he attended the seminar conducted by René Thom at the Institut des Hautes Études Scientifiques (IHES). In 1969 Pham received his Ph.D. with supervisor Raymond Stora from Saclay with thesis Singularités des processus de diffusion multiple. He became in 1970 a professor at the University of Nice Sophia Antipolis and retired there in 2001 as professor emeritus. He was a visiting professor in Hanoi for the academic year 1979–1980. He was a frequent visitor at the Institut Fourier in Grenoble.

His research deals with analytic singularities of Feynman integrals, Landau singularities in S-matrix theory, singularities of systems of plane algebraic curves, microlocal analysis, function theory of several complex variables, semiclassical approximations in quantum mechanics, and Sato's hyperfunctions. Pham in the 1960s applied Thom's methods of differential topology to Landau singularities and in the 1970s worked with Bernard Teissier on singularities of systems of plane algebraic curves.

In 1970 he was an Invited Speaker at the ICM in Nice with talk (Fractions lipschitziennes et saturation de Zariski des algèbres analytiques complexes).

== Sources ==
- André Voros and Bernard Malgrange Les travaux de Frédéric Pham, Parts 1,2, Annales de l’Institut Fourier, vol. 53, 2003, p. 957, Publications de Frédéric Pham

== Selected publications ==
- Singularities of integrals. Homology, hyperfunctions and microlocal analysis, Springer Verlag, 2011.
- Singularités des systèmes différentiels de Gauss-Manin, Birkhäuser, 1979.
- Introduction à l’étude topologique des singularités de Landau, Mémorial des Sciences Mathématiques, vol. 164, Paris, Gauthier-Villars 1967.
- with Nguyen Tien Dai and Nguyen Huu Duc: Singularités non dégénérées des systèmes de Gauss-Manin réticulés, Montreuil, Gauthier-Villars, 1981.
- as editor: Hyperfunctions and theoretical physics, Springer Verlag, 1975. (Conference at Nice May 1973)
- Singularités des courbes planes: une introduction à la géometrie analytique complexe, École polytechnique, 1972.
- Fonctions d’une ou deux variables Collections Sciences Sup, Dunod, 2003.
- Les différentielles, Masson, 1996.
- Formules de Picard-Lefschetz généralisées et ramification des intégrales, Bulletin Societé Mathématique de France, vol. 93, 1965, pp. 333–367.
