= Sharafutdinov's retraction =

In mathematics, Sharafutdinov's retraction is a construction that gives a retraction of an open non-negatively curved Riemannian manifold onto its soul.

It was first used by Sharafutdinov to show that any two souls of a complete Riemannian manifold with non-negative sectional curvature are isometric. Perelman later showed that in this setting, Sharafutdinov's retraction is in fact a submersion, thereby essentially settling the soul conjecture.

For open non-negatively curved Alexandrov space, Perelman also showed that there exists a Sharafutdinov retraction from the entire space to the soul. However it is not yet known whether this retraction is submetry or not.
