= Aaron Naber =

American mathematician

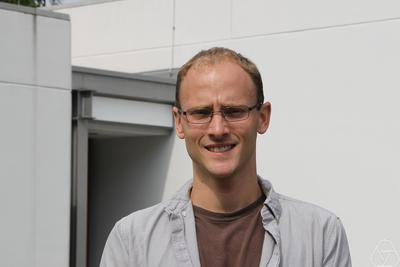
- Born: Aaron Naber; November 16, 1982 (age 43)
- Citizenship: American
- Occupation: mathematician
- Awards: Sloan Fellowship (2014); New Horizons Prize (2018); Simons Investigator Award (2023); Fermat Prize (2024); Elected to the National Academy of Sciences (2024)

Aaron Naber (born November 16, 1982) is an American mathematician.

== Education and career ==
Aaron Naber graduated in 2005 with a B.S. in mathematics from Pennsylvania State University. He received his Ph.D. in mathematics in 2009 from Princeton University. His Ph.D. thesis (Ricci solitons and collapsed spaces) was supervised by Gang Tian. From 2009 to 2012, Naber was a Moore Instructor at Massachusetts Institute of Technology (MIT) and was then an assistant professor from 2012 to 2013. From 2013 to 2015, Naber was at Northwestern University as an associate professor and in 2015 was appointed Kenneth F. Burgess Professor for Mathematics. In 2024, he was appointed a permanent faculty member in the School of Mathematics of the Institute for Advanced Study.

== Research ==
Naber does research on nonlinear harmonic maps, minimal varifolds, general elliptic partial differential equations, geometric analysis, the calculus of variations, and differential geometry with applications in mathematical physics to Yang-Mills theories and Einstein manifolds. In his doctoral dissertation, Naber extended the investigation from the three dimensions investigated by Perelman to manifolds having four or more dimensions (with bounded non-negative curvature) and investigated shrinking soliton solutions. With Gang Tian, he investigated the geometric structure of collapsing n-dimensional Riemannian manifolds with uniformly bounded sectional curvature and in particular that in four and fewer dimensions a smooth orbifold structure results outside a finite number of points.

As a postdoctoral student Naber and Tobias Colding solved the constant dimension conjecture for lower Ricci curvature, which shows limits of manifolds with lower Ricci curvature have a well defined dimension. As a postdoc and later assistant professor at MIT, Naber and Jeff Cheeger introduced the notion of quantitative stratification to Lower Ricci curvature. The estimates and techniques caught on in a wide variety of nonlinear equations, including nonlinear harmonic maps, minimal surfaces, mean curvature flow, and Yang Mills.

During his time at Northwestern, Naber and Cheeger proved the codimension four conjecture, showing in particular that Einstein manifolds have controlled singular sets. This work was extended with Wenshuai Jiang in order to prove sharp rectifiability of the singular sets. During this time Naber gave a characterization of Einstein manifolds, or more generally spaces with bounded Ricci curvature, through the analysis of path space of the manifold. This work was generalized with Robert Haslhofer to give a full generation of the Bakry-Emery-Ledoux estimates for martingales on path space. Near the end of his time at Northwestern, Elia Brue, Naber and Daniele Semola gave a counterexample to the Milnor conjecture for six or more dimensions, showing the existence of spaces with nonnegative Ricci curvature and infinitely generated fundamental group.

Naber and Daniele Valtorta have also done a series of works on nonlinear harmonic maps. Together they developed a stratification theory for nonlinear harmonic maps, which broadly extended the results of Schoen/Uhlenbeck from Hausdorff dimension estimates to finite measure and rectifiable structure for singular sets. The techniques were general and generalized by many others, applying to many situations in which the dimension reduction ideas of Federer had worked, including minimal surfaces, Yang-Mills, Q-valued harmonic maps. Valtorta and Naber have also resolved the Energy Identity conjecture, first for Yang-Mills and later for nonlinear harmonic maps using very different sets of ideas.

== Awards and honors ==
In 2014 Naber was awarded a two-year Sloan Research Fellowship and was an invited speaker with talk The structure and meaning of Ricci curvature at the International Congress of Mathematicians in Seoul. In 2018 he received the New Horizon in Mathematics Prize and was elected a Fellow of the American Mathematical Society. In 2023 Naber was awarded a Simons Investigator award. In 2023 the Institut de Mathématiques de Toulouse awarded him the Fermat Prize. In 2024 Naber was elected a Member of the National Academy of Sciences.

== Publications ==
- with Gang Tian: Geometric structure of collapsing Riemannian manifolds, Part 1, Arxiv 2008, Part 2, Arxiv 2009 (N*-bundles and Almost Ricci Flat Spaces)
- with Jeff Cheeger: Lower Bounds on Ricci Curvature and Quantitative Behavior of Singular Sets, Inventiones Math., vol. 191, 2013, pp. 321–339. Arxiv 2011
- Characterizations of Bounded Ricci Curvature on Smooth and NonSmooth Spaces, Arxiv 2013.
- with Jeff Cheeger: Regularity of Einstein Manifolds and the Codimension 4 Conjecture, Annals of Mathematics, vol. 182, 2014, pp. 1093–1165, Arxiv
- with Tobias Colding: Sharp Hölder continuity of tangent cones for spaces with a lower Ricci curvature bound and applications, Annals of Mathematics, vol. 176, 2012, pp. 1173–1229. Arxiv 2011
- with Daniele Valtorta: Rectifiable-Reifenberg and the regularity of stationary and minimizing harmonic maps, Annals of Mathematics, vol. 185, 2017, pp. 131–227.
- with Robert Haslhofer: Ricci Curvature and Bochner Formulas for Martingales, Comm. in Pure and Applied Math, Vol 71 Iss 6, Arxiv 2016
- with Wenshuai Jiang: L^{2} Curvature Bounds on Manifolds with Bounded Ricci Curvature, Annals of Mathematics, vol. 193-1, Arxiv 2016
- with Daniele Valtorta: Energy identity for stationary Yang-Mills, Inventiones, vol. 216, Arxiv 2016
- with Jeff Cheeger and Wenshuai Jiang: Rectifiability of singular sets in noncollapsed spaces with Ricci curvature bounded below, Annals of Mathematics, vol. 193-2, Arxiv 2018
- Sectional Sampler. Analysis of nonlinear geometric equations, March 2019, Notices of the AMS, p. 408
- with Elia Bruè and Daniele Semola, Fundamental Groups and the Milnor Conjecture, Annals of Mathematics, to appear, Arxiv 2023 (See Milnor conjecture (Ricci curvature).)
- with Elia Bruè and Daniele Semola, Six dimensional counterexample to the Milnor Conjecture, Arxiv 2023
- with Daniele Valtorta: Energy Identity for Stationary Harmonic Maps, Arxiv 2023
- with Nicholas Edelen and Daniele Valtorta: Rectifiable Reifenberg and uniform positivity under almost calibrations, Arxiv 2024
