= Albert Fathi =

Egyptian-French mathematician

- Born: 27 October 1951 (age 74); Egypt
- Education: University of Paris 11
- Occupation: Mathematician
- Known for: Dynamical systems
- Awards: Sophie Germain Prize

Albert Fathi (born 27 October 1951, in Egypt) is an Egyptian-American-French mathematician. He specializes in dynamical systems and is currently a professor at the Georgia Institute of Technology.

Fathi attended the Collège des frères Lasalle in Cairo and grew up bilingual in French and Arabic. At age ten, he came as a political refugee to Paris and studied at the École normale supérieure in Saint-Cloud. He received in 1980 his PhD from the University of Paris 11 under Laurence Siebenmann with thesis Transformations et homéomorphismes préservant la mesure. From 1987 to 1992 he was a professor at the University of Florida. Since 1992 he has taught at the École normale supérieure de Lyon (unit of pure and applied mathematics). He has also taught at the École polytechnique.

He has been a visiting professor at the Institute for Advanced Study (1986/87), at the Universidad Complutense de Madrid (Instituto de Matemática Interdisciplinar), in Nanjing, in Cambridge and at MSRI. In 2013 he received the Sophie Germain Prize. He is a member of the Institut Universitaire de France.

At the International Congress of Mathematicians in 2014 in Seoul, Fathi was an Invited Speaker with talk Weak KAM Theory: the connection between Aubry-Mather theory and viscosity solutions of the Hamilton–Jacobi equation.

== Selected publications ==
- The Weak KAM Theorem in Lagrangian Dynamics, Cambridge University Press 2012 Preliminary version of Weak KAM Theorem in Lagrangian Dynamics
- with François Laudenbach, Valentin Poénaru: Thurston´s Work on Surfaces, Princeton University Press 2012 (originally published in Travaux de Thurston, Asterisque, tome 65/66, 1979)
- editor with Jean-Christophe Yoccoz: Dynamical systems: Michael Herman memorial volume, Cambridge University Press 2006
- with Michael Shub, Remi Langevin: Global stability of dynamical systems, Springer Verlag 1987
- editor with Yong-Geun Oh, Claude Viterbo: Symplectic topology and measure preserving dynamical systems, AMS 2010 (Summer Conference, Snowbird 2007)
- Systèmes dynamiques, Ecole Polytechnique 1997
- Dehn twists and pseudo-Anosov diffeomorphisms. Invent. Math. 87 (1987), no. 1, 129–151.
- Théorème KAM faible et théorie de Mather sur les systèmes lagrangiens. Comptes Rendus de l'Académie des Sciences, Série I 324 (1997), no. 9, 1043–1046.
- with Antonio Siconolfi: Existence of C^{1} critical subsolutions of the Hamilton–Jacobi equation. Invent. Math. 155 (2004), no. 2, 363–388.
- with Antonio Siconolfi: PDE aspects of Aubry-Mather theory for quasiconvex Hamiltonians. Calc. Var. Partial Differential Equations 22 (2005), no. 2, 185–228.
- with Alessio Figalli: Optimal transportation on non-compact manifolds. Israel Journal of Mathematics 175 (2010), 1–59.
