= Milnor map =

In mathematics, Milnor maps are named in honor of John Milnor, who introduced them to topology and algebraic geometry in his book Singular Points of Complex Hypersurfaces (Princeton University Press, 1968) and earlier lectures. The most studied Milnor maps are actually fibrations, and the phrase Milnor fibration is more commonly encountered in the mathematical literature. These were introduced to study isolated singularities by constructing numerical invariants related to the topology of a smooth deformation of the singular space.

== Definition ==
Let $f(z_0,\dots,z_n)$ be a non-constant polynomial function of $n+1$ complex variables $z_0,\dots,z_n$ where the vanishing locus of

$$f(z)\ \text{ and }\ \frac{\partial f}{\partial z_i}(z)$$

is only at the origin, meaning the associated variety $X = V(f)$ is not smooth at the origin. Then, for $K = X \cap S^{2n+1}_{\varepsilon}$ (a sphere inside $\mathbb{C}^{n+1}$ of radius $\varepsilon > 0$) the Milnor fibration^{pg 68} associated to $f$ is defined as the map

$$\phi\colon (S_\varepsilon^{2n+1}\setminus K) \to S^1\ \text{ sending } \ x \mapsto \frac{f(x)}{|f(x)|}$$,

which is a locally trivial smooth fibration for sufficiently small $\varepsilon$. Originally this was proven as a theorem by Milnor, but was later taken as the definition of a Milnor fibration. Note this is a well defined map since

$$f(x) = |f(x)|\cdot e^{2\pi i \operatorname{Arg}(f(x))}$$,

where $\operatorname{Arg}(f(x))$ is the argument of a complex number.

=== Historical motivation ===
One of the original motivations for studying such maps was in the study of knots constructed by taking an $\varepsilon$-ball around a singular point of a plane curve, which is isomorphic to a real 4-dimensional ball, and looking at the knot inside the boundary, which is a 1-manifold inside of a 3-sphere. Since this concept could be generalized to hypersurfaces with isolated singularities, Milnor introduced the subject and proved his theorem.

=== In algebraic geometry ===
Another closed related notion in algebraic geometry is the Milnor fiber of an isolated hypersurface singularity. This has a similar setup, where a polynomial $f$ with $f = 0$ having a singularity at the origin, but now the polynomial

$$f_t\colon \mathbb{C}^{n+1} \to \mathbb{C}\ \text{ sending }\ (z_0,\ldots,z_n)\mapsto f(z_0,\ldots,z_n) - t$$

is considered. Then, the algebraic Milnor fiber is taken as one of the polynomials $f_{t\neq 0}$.

== Properties and Theorems ==
=== Parallelizability ===
One of the basic structure theorems about Milnor fibers is they are parallelizable manifolds^{pg 75}.

=== Homotopy type ===
Milnor fibers are special because they have the homotopy type of a bouquet of spheres^{pg 78}. The number of these spheres is the Milnor number. In fact, the number of spheres can be computed using the formula

$$\mu(f) = \text{dim}_\mathbb{C}\frac{\mathbb{C}[[z_0,\ldots,z_n]]}{\operatorname{Jac}(f)},$$

where the quotient ideal is the Jacobian ideal, defined by the partial derivatives $\partial f / \partial z_i$. These spheres deformed to the algebraic Milnor fiber are the Vanishing cycles of the fibration^{pg 83}. Computing the eigenvalues of their monodromy is computationally challenging and requires advanced techniques such as b-functions^{pg 23}.

=== Milnor's fibration theorem ===
Milnor's Fibration Theorem states that, for every $f$ such that the origin is a singular point of the hypersurface $V_f$ (in particular, for every non-constant square-free polynomial $f$ of two variables, the case of plane curves), then for $\epsilon$ sufficiently small,

$$\dfrac{f}{|f|}\colon \left(S^{2n+1}_{\varepsilon} \setminus V_f \right) \to S^1$$

is a fibration. Each fiber is a non-compact differentiable manifold of real dimension $2n$. Note that the closure of each fiber is a compact manifold with boundary. Here the boundary corresponds to the intersection of $V_f$ with the $(2n+1)$-sphere (of sufficiently small radius) and therefore it is a real manifold of dimension $(2n-1)$. Furthermore, this compact manifold with boundary, which is known as the Milnor fiber (of the isolated singular point of $V_f$ at the origin), is diffeomorphic to the intersection of the closed $(2n+2)$-ball (bounded by the small $(2n+1)$-sphere) with the (non-singular) hypersurface $V_g$ where $g=f-e$ and $e$ is any sufficiently small non-zero complex number. This small piece of hypersurface is also called a Milnor fiber.

Milnor maps at other radii are not always fibrations, but they still have many interesting properties. For most (but not all) polynomials, the Milnor map at infinity (that is, at any sufficiently large radius) is again a fibration.

== Examples ==
The Milnor map of $f(z,w)=z^2+w^3$ at any radius is a fibration; this construction gives the trefoil knot its structure as a fibered knot.

== See also ==
- Vanishing cycle
- Mixed Hodge structure
