= Karsten Grove =

Danish-American mathematician

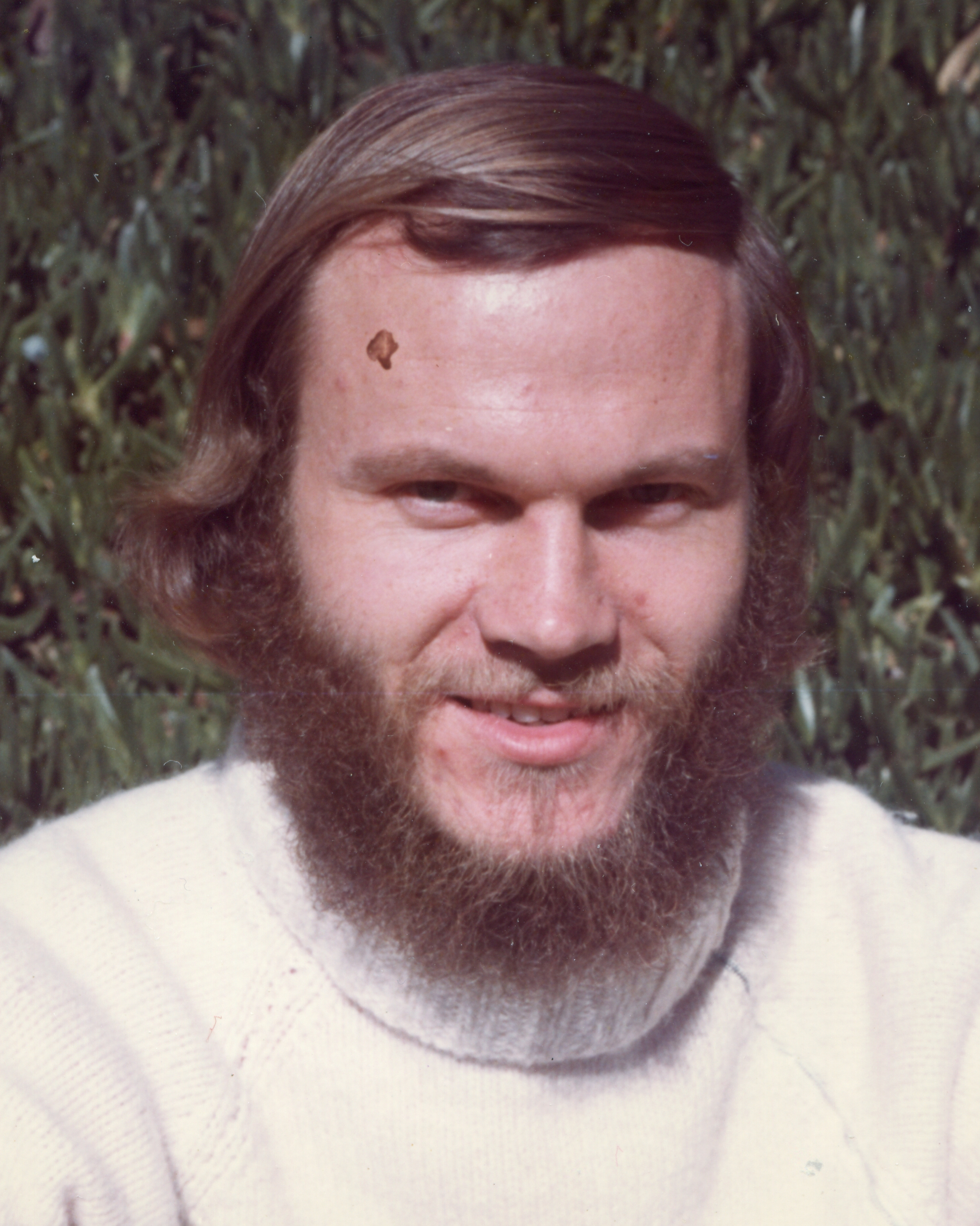
Danish-American mathematician Karsten Grove at Berkeley, California

Karsten Grove is a Danish-American mathematician working in metric and differential geometry, differential topology and global analysis, mainly in topics related to global Riemannian geometry, Alexandrov geometry, isometric group actions and manifolds with positive or nonnegative sectional curvature.

== Biography ==
Grove studied mathematics at Aarhus University, where he obtained a Cand. Scient. (equivalent to a M.A.) in 1971 and Lic. Scient. (equivalent to a Ph.D.) in 1974. Between 1971 and 1972 he also acted as an instructor at Aarhus University. From 1972 to 1974 he had a postdoctoral position at the University of Bonn under the supervision of Wilhelm Klingenberg, despite not having yet formally concluded his doctoral degree. In 1974, Grove became an assistant professor at the University of Copenhagen and was promoted to associate professor in 1976, a position he held until 1987. He became a professor at the University of Maryland in 1984, retiring from this position in 2009. Since 2007 he has held the endowed chair of "Rev. Howard J. Kenna, C.S.C. Professor" at the University of Notre Dame. Throughout his career, Grove has had 20 doctoral students, and 51 academic descendants. Grove was an invited speaker at the International Congress of Mathematicians in 1990 in Kyoto (Metric and Topological Measurements on manifolds). He is a fellow of the American Mathematical Society.

== Mathematical work ==
One of Grove's most recognized mathematical contributions to Riemannian Geometry is the Diameter Sphere Theorem, proved jointly with Katsuhiro Shiohama in 1977, which states that a smooth closed Riemannian manifold $(M,g)$ with $\sec \ge 1$ and $\operatorname{diam} > \pi/2$ is homeomorphic to a sphere. Subsequently, the critical point theory for distance functions developed as part of the proof of this result led to several important advances in the area. Another result obtained by Grove, in collaboration with Peter Petersen, is the finiteness of homotopy types of manifolds of a fixed dimension with lower sectional curvature bounds, upper diameter bound, and lower volume bound.
