= Brieskorn manifold =

In mathematics, a Brieskorn manifold or Brieskorn–Phạm manifold, introduced by Egbert Brieskorn (1966, 1966b), is the intersection of a small sphere around the origin with the singular, complex hypersurface

$$x_1^{k_1}+\cdots+x_n^{k_n}=0$$

studied by Frédéric Pham (1965).

Brieskorn manifolds give examples of exotic spheres, for example the Gromoll–Meyer sphere.
