= Milnor conjecture (knot theory) =

Theorem that the slice genus of the (p, q) torus knot is (p-1)(q-1)/2

In knot theory, the Milnor conjecture says that the slice genus of the $(p, q)$ torus knot is

$$\frac{(p-1)(q-1)}{2}.$$

It is in a similar vein to the Thom conjecture.

The conjecture (named after John Milnor) was first proved by gauge theoretic methods by Peter Kronheimer and Tomasz Mrowka. Jacob Rasmussen later gave a purely combinatorial proof using Khovanov homology, by means of the s-invariant.
