= Laurent C. Siebenmann =

Canadian mathematician

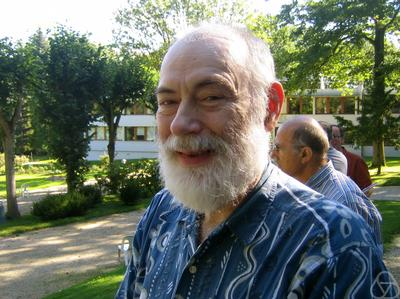
- Laurent Siebenmann at the IHÉS, 2007
- Born: 1939 (age 86–87); Toronto, Ontario, Canada
- Education: University of Toronto; Princeton University
- Awards: Jeffery–Williams Prize
- Scientific career
- Fields: Mathematics
- Workplaces: University of Paris-Sud
- Doctoral advisor: John Milnor
- Doctoral students: Francis Bonahon; Albert Fathi

Laurent Carl Siebenmann (the first name is sometimes spelled Laurence or Larry) (born 1939) is a Canadian mathematician based at the Université de Paris-Sud at Orsay, France.

After working for several years as a Professor at Orsay he became a Directeur de Recherches at the Centre national de la recherche scientifique in 1976. He is a topologist who works on manifolds and who co-discovered the Kirby–Siebenmann class.

== Education ==
Siebenmann's undergraduate studies were at the University of Toronto. He received a Ph.D. from Princeton University under the supervision of John Milnor in 1965 with the dissertation The obstruction to finding a boundary for an open manifold of dimension greater than five. His doctoral students at Orsay included Francis Bonahon and Albert Fathi.

== Recognition ==
In 1985 he was awarded the Jeffery–Williams Prize by the Canadian Mathematical Society. In 2012 he became a fellow of the American Mathematical Society.

== Selected publications ==
- Kirby, Robion C.; Siebenmann, Laurence C. (1977). Foundational Essays on Topological Manifolds, Smoothings, and Triangulations (PDF). Annals of Mathematics Studies. Vol. 88. Princeton, NJ: Princeton University Press. ISBN 0-691-08191-3. MR 0645390.
