= Milnor conjecture (Ricci curvature) =

In 1968 John Milnor conjectured that the fundamental group of a complete manifold is finitely generated if its Ricci curvature stays nonnegative. In an oversimplified interpretation, such a manifold has a finite number of "holes". A version for almost-flat manifolds holds from work of Gromov.

In two dimensions $M^2$ has finitely generated fundamental group as a consequence that if $\operatorname{Ric}>0$ for noncompact $M^2$, then it is flat or diffeomorphic to $\mathbb{R}^2$, by work of Cohn-Vossen from 1935.

In three dimensions the conjecture holds due to a noncompact $M^3$ with $\operatorname{Ric}>0$ being diffeomorphic to $\mathbb{R}^3$ or having its universal cover isometrically split. The diffeomorphic part is due to Schoen-Yau (1982) while the other part is by Liu (2013). Another proof of the full statement has been given by Pan (2020).

In 2023 Bruè, Naber and Semola disproved in two preprints the conjecture for six or more dimensions by constructing counterexamples that they described as "smooth fractal snowflakes". The status of the conjecture for four or five dimensions remains open.
