= Milnor–Wood inequality =

In mathematics, more specifically in differential geometry and geometric topology, the Milnor–Wood inequality is an obstruction to endow circle bundles over surfaces with a flat structure. It is named after John Milnor and John W. Wood.

== Flat bundles ==
For linear bundles, flatness is defined as the vanishing of the curvature form of an associated connection. An arbitrary smooth (or topological) d-dimensional fiber bundle is flat if it can be endowed with a foliation of codimension d that is transverse to the fibers.

== The inequality ==
The Milnor–Wood inequality is named after two separate results that were proven by John Milnor and John W. Wood. Both of them deal with orientable circle bundles over a closed oriented surface $\Sigma_g$ of positive genus g.

Theorem (Milnor, 1958) Let $\pi\colon E \to \Sigma_g$ be a flat oriented linear circle bundle. Then the Euler number of the bundle satisfies $|e(\pi)| \leq g -1$.

Theorem (Wood, 1971) Let $\pi\colon E \to \Sigma_g$ be a flat oriented topological circle bundle. Then the Euler number of the bundle satisfies $|e(\pi)| \leq 2g -2$.

Wood's theorem implies Milnor's older result, as the homomorphism $\pi_1:\Sigma\to SL(2,\R)$ classifying the linear flat circle bundle gives rise to a topological circle bundle via the 2-fold covering map $SL(2,\R)\to PSL(2,\R) \subset \operatorname{Homeo}^+(S^1)$, doubling the Euler number.

Either of these two statements can be meant by referring to the Milnor–Wood inequality.
