= Whitney topologies =

Topologies defined on the set of smooth mappings between manifolds

In mathematics, and especially differential topology, functional analysis and singularity theory, the Whitney topologies are a countably infinite family of topologies defined on the set of smooth mappings between two smooth manifolds. They are named after the American mathematician Hassler Whitney.

== Construction ==
Let M and N be two real, smooth manifolds. Furthermore, let C^{∞}(M,N) denote the space of smooth mappings between M and N. The notation C^{∞} means that the mappings are infinitely differentiable, i.e. partial derivatives of all orders exist and are continuous.

=== Whitney C^{k}-topology ===
For some integer k ≥ 0, let J^{k}(M,N) denote the k-jet space of mappings between M and N. The jet space can be endowed with a smooth structure (i.e. a structure as a C^{∞} manifold) which make it into a topological space. This topology is used to define a topology on C^{∞}(M,N).

For a fixed integer k ≥ 0 consider an open subset U ⊂ J^{k}(M,N), and denote by S^{k}(U) the following:

$$S^k(U) = \{ f \in C^{\infty}(M,N) : (J^kf)(M) \subseteq U \} .$$

The sets S^{k}(U) form a basis for the Whitney C^{k}-topology on C^{∞}(M,N).

=== Whitney C^{∞}-topology ===
For each choice of k ≥ 0, the Whitney C^{k}-topology gives a topology for C^{∞}(M,N); in other words the Whitney C^{k}-topology tells us which subsets of C^{∞}(M,N) are open sets. Let us denote by W^{k} the set of open subsets of C^{∞}(M,N) with respect to the Whitney C^{k}-topology. Then the Whitney C^{∞}-topology is defined to be the topology whose basis is given by W, where:

$$W = \bigcup_{k=0}^{\infty} W^k .$$

== Dimensionality ==
Notice that C^{∞}(M,N) has infinite dimension, whereas J^{k}(M,N) has finite dimension. In fact, J^{k}(M,N) is a real, finite-dimensional manifold. To see this, let ℝ^{k}[x_{1},...,x_{m}] denote the space of polynomials, with real coefficients, in m variables of order at most k and with zero as the constant term. This is a real vector space with dimension

$$\dim\left\{\R^k[x_1,\ldots,x_m]\right\} = \sum_{i=1}^k \frac{(m+i-1)!}{(m-1)! \cdot i!} = \left( \frac{(m+k)!}{m!\cdot k!} - 1 \right) .$$

Writing a = dim{ℝ^{k}[x_{1},...,x_{m}]} then, by the standard theory of vector spaces ℝ^{k}[x_{1},...,x_{m}] ≅ ℝ^{a}, and so is a real, finite-dimensional manifold. Next, define:

$$B_{m,n}^k = \bigoplus_{i=1}^n \R^k[x_1,\ldots,x_m], \implies \dim\left\{B_{m,n}^k\right\} = n \dim \left\{ A_m^k \right\} = n \left( \frac{(m+k)!}{m!\cdot k!} - 1 \right) .$$

Using b to denote the dimension B^{k}_{m,n}, we see that B^{k}_{m,n} ≅ ℝ^{b}, and so is a real, finite-dimensional manifold.

In fact, if M and N have dimension m and n respectively then:

$$\dim\!\left\{J^k(M,N)\right\} = m + n + \dim \!\left\{B_{n,m}^k\right\} = m + n\left( \frac{(m+k)!}{m!\cdot k!}\right).$$

== Topology ==
Given the Whitney C^{∞}-topology, the space C^{∞}(M,N) is a Baire space, i.e. every residual set is dense.
