= Kervaire invariant =

Concept in differential topology

In mathematics, the Kervaire invariant is an invariant of a framed $(4k+2)$-dimensional manifold that measures whether the manifold could be surgically converted into a sphere. This invariant evaluates to 0 if the manifold can be converted to a sphere, and 1 otherwise. This invariant was named after Michel Kervaire who built on work of Cahit Arf.

The Kervaire invariant is defined as the Arf invariant of the skew-quadratic form on the middle dimensional homology group. It can be thought of as the simply-connected quadratic L-group $L_{4k+2}$, and thus analogous to the other invariants from L-theory: the signature, a $4k$-dimensional invariant (either symmetric or quadratic, $L^{4k} \cong L_{4k}$), and the De Rham invariant, a $(4k+1)$-dimensional symmetric invariant $L^{4k+1}$.

In any given dimension, there are only two possibilities: either all manifolds have Arf–Kervaire invariant equal to 0, or half have Arf–Kervaire invariant 0 and the other half have Arf–Kervaire invariant 1.

The Kervaire invariant problem is the problem of determining in which dimensions the Kervaire invariant can be nonzero. For differentiable manifolds, this can happen in dimensions 2, 6, 14, 30, 62, and possibly 126, and in no other dimensions. In 2024 a preprint by Weinan Lin, Guozhen Wang and Zhouli Xu, settled the case in dimension 126, proving the existence of smooth framed manifolds with Kervaire invariant one.

== Definition ==
The Kervaire invariant is the Arf invariant of the quadratic form determined by the framing on the middle-dimensional $\Z/2\Z$-coefficient homology group

$$q\colon H_{2m+1}(M;\Z/2\mathbb{Z}) \to \Z/2\Z,$$

and is thus sometimes called the Arf–Kervaire invariant. The quadratic form (properly, skew-quadratic form) is a quadratic refinement of the usual ε-symmetric form on the middle dimensional homology of an (unframed) even-dimensional manifold; the framing yields the quadratic refinement.

The quadratic form q can be defined by algebraic topology using functional Steenrod squares, and geometrically via the self-intersections of immersions $S^{2m+1}$$\to$ $M^{4m+2}$ determined by the framing, or by the triviality/non-triviality of the normal bundles of embeddings $S^{2m+1}$$\to$ $M^{4m+2}$ (for $m \neq 0,1,3$) and the mod 2 Hopf invariant of maps $S^{4m+2+k} \to S^{2m+1+k}$ (for $m = 0,1,3$).

== History ==
The Kervaire invariant is a generalization of the Arf invariant of a framed surface (that is, a 2-dimensional manifold with stably trivialized tangent bundle) which was used by Lev Pontryagin in 1950 to compute the homotopy group $\pi_{n+2}(S^n)=\Z/2\Z$ of maps $S^{n+2}$ $\to$ $S^n$ (for $n\geq 2$), which is the cobordism group of surfaces embedded in $S^{n+2}$ with trivialized normal bundle.

Kervaire (1960) used his invariant for n = 10 to construct the Kervaire manifold, a 10-dimensional PL manifold with no differentiable structure, the first example of such a manifold, by showing that his invariant does not vanish on this PL manifold, but vanishes on all smooth manifolds of dimension 10.

Kervaire & Milnor (1963) computes the group of exotic spheres (in dimension greater than 4), with one step in the computation depending on the Kervaire invariant problem. Specifically, they show that the set of exotic spheres of dimension n – specifically the monoid of smooth structures on the standard n-sphere – is isomorphic to the group $\Theta_n$ of h-cobordism classes of oriented homotopy n-spheres. They compute this latter in terms of a map

$$\Theta_n/bP_{n+1}\to \pi_n^S/J,\,$$

where $bP_{n+1}$ is the cyclic subgroup of n-spheres that bound a parallelizable manifold of dimension $n+1$, $\pi_n^S$ is the nth stable homotopy group of spheres, and J is the image of the J-homomorphism, which is also a cyclic group. The groups $bP_{n+1}$ and $J$ have easily understood cyclic factors, which are trivial or order two except in dimension $n = 4k+3$, in which case they are large, with order related to the Bernoulli numbers. The quotients are the difficult parts of the groups. The map between these quotient groups is either an isomorphism or is injective and has an image of index 2. It is the latter if and only if there is an n-dimensional framed manifold of nonzero Kervaire invariant, and thus the classification of exotic spheres depends up to a factor of 2 on the Kervaire invariant problem.

== Examples ==
For the standard embedded torus, the skew-symmetric form is given by
$$\begin{pmatrix}0 & 1\\-1 & 0\end{pmatrix}$$
(with respect to the standard symplectic basis), and the skew-quadratic refinement is given by $xy$ with respect to this basis: $Q(1,0)=Q(0,1)=0$: the basis curves don't self-link; and $Q(1,1)=1$: a (1,1) self-links, as in the Hopf fibration. This form thus has Arf invariant 0 (most of its elements have norm 0; it has isotropy index 1), and thus the standard embedded torus has Kervaire invariant 0.

== Kervaire invariant problem ==
The question of in which dimensions n there are n-dimensional framed manifolds of nonzero Kervaire invariant is called the Kervaire invariant problem. This is only possible if n is 2 mod 4, and indeed one must have n is of the form $2^k-2$ (two less than a power of two). The question is almost completely resolved: there are manifolds with nonzero Kervaire invariant in dimension 2, 6, 14, 30, 62, and none in all other dimensions other than possibly 126. However, Zhouli Xu (in collaboration with Weinan Lin and Guozhen Wang) announced on May 30, 2024, that there exists a manifold with nonzero Kervaire invariant in dimension 126.

The main results are those of William Browder (1969), who reduced the problem from differential topology to stable homotopy theory and showed that the only possible dimensions are $2^k-2$, and those of Michael A. Hill, Michael J. Hopkins, and Douglas C. Ravenel (2016), who showed that there were no such manifolds for $k \geq 8$ ($n \geq 254$). Together with explicit constructions in dimensions 2, 6, 14, 30, and a non-constructive proof in dimension 62, this left open only dimension 126. This dimension now appears to be closed by the December 14, 2024 preprint by Weinan Lin, Guozhen Wang and Zhouli Xu, which still needs to be peer reviewed (although the third author has claimed that the preprint has been peer reviewed, as of May 28, 2026).

It was conjectured by Michael Atiyah that there is such a manifold in dimension 126, and that the higher-dimensional manifolds with nonzero Kervaire invariant are related to well-known exotic manifolds two dimension higher, in dimensions 16, 32, 64, and 128, namely the Cayley projective plane $\mathbf{O}P^2$ (dimension 16, octonionic projective plane) and the analogous Rosenfeld projective planes (the bi-octonionic projective plane in dimension 32, the quateroctonionic projective plane in dimension 64, and the octo-octonionic projective plane in dimension 128), specifically that there is a construction that takes these projective planes and produces a manifold with nonzero Kervaire invariant in two dimensions lower.

=== History ===
- Kervaire (1960) proved that the Kervaire invariant is zero for manifolds of dimension 10 and 18.
- Kervaire & Milnor (1963) proved that the Kervaire invariant can be nonzero for manifolds of dimension 6 and 14.
- Anderson, Brown & Peterson (1966) proved that the Kervaire invariant is zero for manifolds of dimension 8n + 2 for n > 1.
- Mahowald & Tangora (1967) proved that the Kervaire invariant is nonzero for some manifolds of dimension 30.
- Browder (1969) proved that the Kervaire invariant is zero for manifolds of dimension n not of the form 2^{k} − 2.
- Barratt, Jones & Mahowald (1984) showed that the Kervaire invariant is nonzero for some manifold of dimension 62. An alternative proof was given later by Xu (2016).
- Hill, Hopkins & Ravenel (2016) showed that the Kervaire invariant is zero for n-dimensional framed manifolds for n = 2^{k} − 2 with k ≥ 8. They constructed a cohomology theory Ω with the following properties from which their result follows immediately:
  - The coefficient groups Ω^{n}(point) have period 2^{8} = 256 in n.
  - The coefficient groups Ω^{n}(point) have a "gap": they vanish for n = –1, –2, and –3.
  - The coefficient groups Ω^{n}(point) can detect non-vanishing Kervaire invariants: more precisely, if the Kervaire invariant for manifolds of dimension n is nonzero, then it has a nonzero image in Ω^{−n}(point).
- Lin, Wang & Xu (2024) (preprint) proved that the Kervaire invariant is nonzero for some manifolds of dimension 126.

== Kervaire–Milnor invariant ==
The Kervaire–Milnor invariant is a closely related invariant of framed surgery of a 2-, 6-, or 14-dimensional framed manifold, that gives isomorphisms from the 2nd and 6th stable homotopy group of spheres to $\Z/2\Z$, and a homomorphism from the 14th stable homotopy group of spheres onto $\Z/2\Z$. For n = 2, 6, and 14, there is an exotic framing on $S^{n/2} \times S^{n/2}$ with Kervaire–Milnor invariant 1.

== See also ==
- Signature, a 4k-dimensional invariant
- De Rham invariant, a (4k + 1)-dimensional invariant
