= L-group =

In mathematics, L-group or l-group may refer to the following groups:

- The Langlands dual, ^{L}G, of a reductive algebraic group G
- A group in L-theory, L(G)
- Lattice-ordered groups
