= Intersection theory (disambiguation) =

Intersection theory may refer to:

- Intersection theory, especially in algebraic geometry
- Intersection (set theory)
