= Signature (topology) =

Integer invariant of certain classes of topological manifolds

In the field of topology, the signature is an integer invariant which is defined for an oriented manifold M of dimension divisible by four.

This invariant of a manifold has been studied in detail, starting with Rokhlin's theorem for 4-manifolds, and Hirzebruch signature theorem.

== Definition ==
Given a connected and oriented manifold M of dimension 4k, the cup product gives rise to a quadratic form Q on the 'middle' real cohomology group

$$H^{2k}(M,\mathbf{R})$$.

The basic identity for the cup product

$$\alpha^p \smile \beta^q = (-1)^{pq}(\beta^q \smile \alpha^p)$$

shows that with p = q = 2k the product is symmetric. It takes values in

$$H^{4k}(M,\mathbf{R})$$.

If we assume also that M is compact, Poincaré duality identifies this with

$$H_{0}(M,\mathbf{R})$$

which can be identified with $\mathbf{R}$. Therefore, the cup product, under these hypotheses, does give rise to a symmetric bilinear form on H^{2k}(M,R); and therefore to a quadratic form Q. The form Q is non-degenerate due to Poincaré duality, as it pairs non-degenerately with itself. More generally, the signature can be defined in this way for any general compact polyhedron with 4n-dimensional Poincaré duality.

The signature $\sigma(M)$ of M is by definition the signature of Q, that is, $\sigma(M) = n_+ - n_-$ where any diagonal matrix defining Q has $n_+$ positive entries and $n_-$ negative entries. If M is not connected, its signature is defined to be the sum of the signatures of its connected components.

== Other dimensions ==
If M has dimension not divisible by 4, its signature is usually defined to be 0. There are alternative generalization in L-theory: the signature can be interpreted as the 4k-dimensional (simply connected) symmetric L-group $L^{4k},$ or as the 4k-dimensional quadratic L-group $L_{4k},$ and these invariants do not always vanish for other dimensions. The Kervaire invariant is a mod 2 (i.e., an element of $\mathbf{Z}/2$) for framed manifolds of dimension 4k+2 (the quadratic L-group $L_{4k+2}$), while the de Rham invariant is a mod 2 invariant of manifolds of dimension 4k+1 (the symmetric L-group $L^{4k+1}$); the other dimensional L-groups vanish.

=== Kervaire invariant ===
When $d=4k+2=2(2k+1)$ is twice an odd integer (singly even), the same construction gives rise to an antisymmetric bilinear form. Such forms do not have a signature invariant; if they are non-degenerate, any two such forms are equivalent. However, if one takes a quadratic refinement of the form, which occurs if one has a framed manifold, then the resulting ε-quadratic forms need not be equivalent, being distinguished by the Arf invariant. The resulting invariant of a manifold is called the Kervaire invariant.

== Properties ==
- Compact oriented manifolds M and N satisfy $\sigma(M \sqcup N) = \sigma(M) + \sigma(N)$ by definition, and satisfy $\sigma(M\times N) = \sigma(M)\sigma(N)$ by a Künneth formula.
- If M is an oriented boundary, then $\sigma(M)=0$.
- René Thom (1954) showed that the signature of a manifold is a cobordism invariant, and in particular is given by some linear combination of its Pontryagin numbers. For example, in four dimensions, it is given by $\frac{p_1}{3}$. Friedrich Hirzebruch (1954) found an explicit expression for this linear combination as the L genus of the manifold.
- William Browder (1962) proved that a simply connected compact polyhedron with 4n-dimensional Poincaré duality is homotopy equivalent to a manifold if and only if its signature satisfies the expression of the Hirzebruch signature theorem.
- Rokhlin's theorem says that the signature of a 4-dimensional simply connected manifold with a spin structure is divisible by 16.

== See also ==
- Hirzebruch signature theorem
- Genus of a multiplicative sequence
- Rokhlin's theorem
