= 4n + 2 =

4n + 2 may refer to:

- Singly even number, a number of the form 4n + 2 for an integer n
- Hückel's rule in organic chemistry, also known as the 4n + 2 rule
