= Kervaire semi-characteristic =

Invariant of closed manifolds, in mathematics

In mathematics, the Kervaire semi-characteristic, introduced by Michel Kervaire (1956), is an invariant of closed manifolds M of dimension $4n+1$ taking values in $\Z/2\Z$, given by

$$k_F(M) = \sum_{i=0}^{2n} \dim H^{2i}(M,F)\bmod 2$$

where F is a field.

Michael Atiyah and Isadore Singer (1971) showed that the Kervaire semi-characteristic of a differentiable manifold is given by the index of a skew-adjoint elliptic operator.

Assuming M is oriented, the Atiyah vanishing theorem states that if M has two linearly independent vector fields, then $k(M) = 0$.

The difference $k_\Q(M)-k_{\Z/2}(M)$ is the de Rham invariant of $M$.
