= Polarization of an algebraic form =

Technique for expressing a polynomial in simpler fashion by using more variables

In mathematics, in particular in algebra, polarization is a technique for expressing a homogeneous polynomial in a simpler fashion by adjoining more variables. Specifically, given a homogeneous polynomial, polarization produces a unique symmetric multilinear form from which the original polynomial can be recovered by evaluating along a certain diagonal.

Although the technique is deceptively simple, it has applications in many areas of abstract mathematics: in particular to algebraic geometry, invariant theory, and representation theory. Polarization and related techniques form the foundations for Weyl's invariant theory.

== The technique ==
The fundamental ideas are as follows. Let $f(\mathbf{u})$ be a polynomial in $n$ variables $\mathbf{u} = \left(u_1, u_2, \ldots, u_n\right).$ Suppose that $f$ is homogeneous of degree $d,$ which means that
$$f(t \mathbf{u}) = t^d f(\mathbf{u}) \quad \text{ for all } t.$$

Let $\mathbf{u}^{(1)}, \mathbf{u}^{(2)}, \ldots, \mathbf{u}^{(d)}$ be a collection of indeterminates with $\mathbf{u}^{(i)} = \left(u^{(i)}_1, u^{(i)}_2, \ldots, u^{(i)}_n\right),$ so that there are $d n$ variables altogether. The polar form of $f$ is a polynomial
$$F\left(\mathbf{u}^{(1)}, \mathbf{u}^{(2)}, \ldots, \mathbf{u}^{(d)}\right)$$
which is linear separately in each $\mathbf{u}^{(i)}$ (that is, $F$ is multilinear), symmetric in the $\mathbf{u}^{(i)},$ and such that
$$F\left(\mathbf{u}, \mathbf{u}, \ldots, \mathbf{u}\right) = f(\mathbf{u}).$$

The polar form of $f$ is given by the following construction
$$F\left({\mathbf u}^{(1)}, \dots, {\mathbf u}^{(d)}\right) = \frac{1}{d!}\frac{\partial}{\partial\lambda_1} \dots \frac{\partial}{\partial\lambda_d}f(\lambda_1{\mathbf u}^{(1)} + \dots + \lambda_d{\mathbf u}^{(d)})|_{\lambda=0}.$$
In other words, $F$ is a constant multiple of the coefficient of $\lambda_1 \lambda_2 \ldots \lambda_d$ in the expansion of $f\left(\lambda_1 \mathbf{u}^{(1)} + \cdots + \lambda_d \mathbf{u}^{(d)}\right).$

== Examples ==
A quadratic example. Suppose that $\mathbf{x} = (x,y)$ and $f(\mathbf{x})$ is the quadratic form
$$f(\mathbf{x}) = x^2 + 3 x y + 2 y^2.$$
Then the polarization of $f$ is a function in $\mathbf{x}^{(1)} = (x^{(1)}, y^{(1)})$ and $\mathbf{x}^{(2)} = (x^{(2)}, y^{(2)})$ given by
$$F\left(\mathbf{x}^{(1)}, \mathbf{x}^{(2)}\right) = x^{(1)} x^{(2)} + \frac{3}{2} x^{(2)} y^{(1)} + \frac{3}{2} x^{(1)} y^{(2)} + 2 y^{(1)} y^{(2)}.$$
More generally, if $f$ is any quadratic form then the polarization of $f$ agrees with the conclusion of the polarization identity.

A cubic example. Let $f(x,y) = x^3 + 2xy^2.$ Then the polarization of $f$ is given by
$$F\left(x^{(1)}, y^{(1)}, x^{(2)}, y^{(2)}, x^{(3)}, y^{(3)}\right) = x^{(1)} x^{(2)} x^{(3)} + \frac{2}{3} x^{(1)} y^{(2)} y^{(3)} + \frac{2}{3} x^{(3)} y^{(1)} y^{(2)} + \frac{2}{3} x^{(2)} y^{(3)} y^{(1)}.$$

== Mathematical details and consequences ==
The polarization of a homogeneous polynomial of degree $d$ is valid over any commutative ring in which $d!$ is a unit. In particular, it holds over any field of characteristic zero or whose characteristic is strictly greater than $d.$

=== The polarization isomorphism (by degree) ===
For simplicity, let $k$ be a field of characteristic zero and let $A = k[\mathbf{x}]$ be the polynomial ring in $n$ variables over $k.$ Then $A$ is graded by degree, so that
$$A = \bigoplus_d A_d.$$
The polarization of algebraic forms then induces an isomorphism of vector spaces in each degree
$$A_d \cong \operatorname{Sym}^d k^n$$
where $\operatorname{Sym}^d$ is the $d$-th symmetric power.

These isomorphisms can be expressed independently of a basis as follows. If $V$ is a finite-dimensional vector space and $A$ is the ring of $k$-valued polynomial functions on $V$ graded by homogeneous degree, then polarization yields an isomorphism
$$A_d \cong \operatorname{Sym}^d V^*.$$

=== The algebraic isomorphism ===
Furthermore, the polarization is compatible with the algebraic structure on $A$, so that
$$A \cong \operatorname{Sym}^{\bullet} V^*$$
where $\operatorname{Sym}^{\bullet} V^*$ is the full symmetric algebra over $V^*.$

=== Remarks ===
- For fields of positive characteristic $p,$ the foregoing isomorphisms apply if the graded algebras are truncated at degree $p - 1.$
- There do exist generalizations when $V$ is an infinite-dimensional topological vector space.

== See also ==
- Homogeneous function – Function with a multiplicative scaling behaviour
