= Intersection theory =

Branch of algebraic geometry

In mathematics, intersection theory is one of the main branches of algebraic geometry, where it gives information about the intersection of two subvarieties of a given variety. The theory for varieties is older, with roots in Bézout's theorem on curves and elimination theory. On the other hand, the topological theory more quickly reached a definitive form.

There is yet an ongoing development of intersection theory. Currently the main focus is on: virtual fundamental cycles, quantum intersection rings, Gromov–Witten theory and the extension of intersection theory from schemes to stacks.

== Topological intersection form ==
For a connected oriented manifold $M$ of dimension $2n$ the intersection form is defined on the $n$-th cohomology group (what is usually called the 'middle dimension') by the evaluation of the cup product on the fundamental class $[M]$ in $H_{2n}(M,\partial M)$. Stated precisely, there is a bilinear form

$$\lambda_M \colon H^n(M,\partial M) \times H^n(M,\partial M)\to \mathbf{Z}$$

given by

$$\lambda_M(a,b)=\langle a\smile b,[M]\rangle \in \mathbf{Z}$$

with

$$\lambda_M(a,b)=(-1)^n\lambda_M(b,a) \in \mathbf{Z}.$$

This is a symmetric form for n even (so 2n = 4k doubly even), in which case the signature of M is defined to be the signature of the form, and an alternating form for n odd (so 2n = 4k + 2 is singly even). These can be referred to uniformly as ε-symmetric forms, where ε = (−1)^{n} = ±1 respectively for symmetric and skew-symmetric forms. It is possible in some circumstances to refine this form to an ε-quadratic form, though this requires additional data such as a framing of the tangent bundle. It is possible to drop the orientability condition and work with Z/2Z coefficients instead.

These forms are important topological invariants. For example, a theorem of Michael Freedman states that simply connected compact 4-manifolds are (almost) determined by their intersection forms up to homeomorphism.

By Poincaré duality, it turns out that there is a way to think of this geometrically. If possible, choose representative n-dimensional submanifolds A, B for the Poincaré duals of a and b. Then λ_{M} (a, b) is the oriented intersection number of A and B, which is well-defined because since dimensions of A and B sum to the total dimension of M they generically intersect at isolated points. This explains the terminology intersection form.

== Intersection theory in algebraic geometry ==
William Fulton in Intersection Theory (1984) writes

... if A and B are subvarieties of a non-singular variety X, the intersection product A · B should be an equivalence class of algebraic cycles closely related to the geometry of how A ∩ B, A and B are situated in X. Two extreme cases have been most familiar. If the intersection is proper, i.e. dim(A ∩ B) = dim A + dim B − dim X, then A · B is a linear combination of the irreducible components of A ∩ B, with coefficients the intersection multiplicities. At the other extreme, if A = B is a non-singular subvariety, the self-intersection formula says that A · B is represented by the top Chern class of the normal bundle of A in X.

To give a definition, in the general case, of the intersection multiplicity was the major concern of André Weil's 1946 book Foundations of Algebraic Geometry. Work in the 1920s of B. L. van der Waerden had already addressed the question; in the Italian school of algebraic geometry the ideas were well known, but foundational questions were not addressed in the same spirit.

=== Moving cycles ===
A well-working machinery of intersecting algebraic cycles V and W requires more than taking just the set-theoretic intersection V ∩ W of the cycles in question. If the two cycles are in "good position" then the intersection product, denoted V · W, should consist of the set-theoretic intersection of the two subvarieties. However cycles may be in bad position, e.g. two parallel lines in the plane, or a plane containing a line (intersecting in 3-space). In both cases the intersection should be a point, because, again, if one cycle is moved, this would be the intersection. The intersection of two cycles V and W is called proper if the codimension of the (set-theoretic) intersection V ∩ W is the sum of the codimensions of V and W, respectively, i.e. the "expected" value.

Therefore, the concept of moving cycles using appropriate equivalence relations on algebraic cycles is used. The equivalence must be broad enough that given any two cycles V and W, there are equivalent cycles V′ and W′ such that the intersection V′ ∩ W′ is proper. Of course, on the other hand, for a second equivalent V′′ and W′′, V′ ∩ W′ needs to be equivalent to V′′ ∩ W′′.

For the purposes of intersection theory, rational equivalence is the most important one. Briefly, two r-dimensional cycles on a variety X are rationally equivalent if there is a rational function f on a (r + 1)-dimensional subvariety Y, i.e. an element of the function field k(Y) or equivalently a function f : Y → P^{1}, such that V − W = f ^{−1}(0) − f ^{−1}(∞), where f ^{−1}(⋅) is counted with multiplicities. Rational equivalence accomplishes the needs sketched above.

=== Intersection multiplicities ===
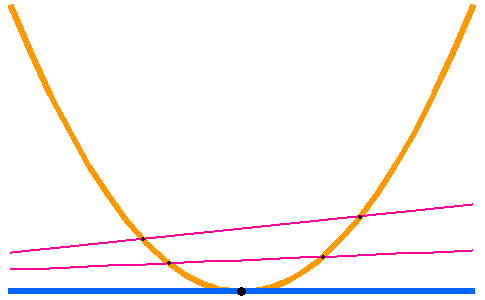
Intersection of lines and parabola

The guiding principle in the definition of intersection multiplicities of cycles is continuity in a certain sense. Consider the following elementary example: the intersection of a parabola y = x^{2} and an axis y = 0 should be 2 · (0, 0), because if one of the cycles moves (yet in an undefined sense), there are precisely two intersection points which both converge to (0, 0) when the cycles approach the depicted position. (The picture is misleading insofar as the apparently empty intersection of the parabola and the line y = −3 is empty, because only the real solutions of the equations are depicted).

The first fully satisfactory definition of intersection multiplicities was given by Serre: Let the ambient variety X be smooth (or all local rings regular). Further let V and W be two (irreducible reduced closed) subvarieties, such that their intersection is proper. The construction is local, therefore the varieties may be represented by two ideals I and J in the coordinate ring of X. Let Z be an irreducible component of the set-theoretic intersection V ∩ W and z its generic point. The multiplicity of Z in the intersection product V · W is defined by

$$\mu(Z; V, W) := \sum^\infty_{i=0} (-1)^i \text{length}_{\mathcal O_{X, z}} \text{Tor}_i^{\mathcal O_{X, z}} (\mathcal O_{X, z}/I, \mathcal O_{X, z}/J),$$

the alternating sum over the length over the local ring of X in z of torsion groups of the factor rings corresponding to the subvarieties. This expression is sometimes referred to as Serre's Tor-formula.

Remarks:

- The first summand, the length of
  $$\left ( \mathcal O_{X, z}/I \right ) \otimes_{\mathcal O_{X, z}} \left (\mathcal O_{X, z}/J \right ) = \mathcal O_{Z, z}$$
  is the "naive" guess of the multiplicity; however, as Serre shows, it is not sufficient.
- The sum is finite, because the regular local ring $\mathcal O_{X, z}$ has finite Tor-dimension.
- If the intersection of V and W is not proper, the above multiplicity will be zero. If it is proper, it is strictly positive. (Both statements are not obvious from the definition).
- Using a spectral sequence argument, it can be shown that μ(Z; V, W) = μ(Z; W, V).

=== The Chow ring ===
The Chow ring is the group of algebraic cycles modulo rational equivalence together with the following commutative intersection product:

$$V \cdot W := \sum_{i} \mu(Z_i; V, W)Z_i$$

whenever V and W meet properly, where $V \cap W = \cup_i Z_i$ is the decomposition of the set-theoretic intersection into irreducible components.

=== Self-intersection ===
Given two subvarieties V and W, one can take their intersection V ∩ W, but it is also possible, though more subtle, to define the self-intersection of a single subvariety.

Given, for instance, a curve C on a surface S, its intersection with itself (as sets) is just itself: C ∩ C = C. This is clearly correct, but on the other hand unsatisfactory: given any two distinct curves on a surface (with no component in common), they intersect in some set of points, which for instance one can count, obtaining an intersection number, and we may wish to do the same for a given curve: the analogy is that intersecting distinct curves is like multiplying two numbers: xy, while self-intersection is like squaring a single number: x^{2}. Formally, the analogy is stated as a symmetric bilinear form (multiplication) and a quadratic form (squaring).

A geometric solution to this is to intersect the curve C not with itself, but with a slightly pushed off version of itself. In the plane, this just means translating the curve C in some direction, but in general one talks about taking a curve C′ that is linearly equivalent to C, and counting the intersection C · C′, thus obtaining an intersection number, denoted C · C. Note that unlike for distinct curves C and D, the actual points of intersection are not defined, because they depend on a choice of C′, but the “self intersection points of C′′ can be interpreted as k generic points on C, where k = C · C. More properly, the self-intersection point of C is the generic point of C, taken with multiplicity C · C.

Alternatively, one can “solve” (or motivate) this problem algebraically by dualizing, and looking at the class of [C] ∪ [C] – this both gives a number, and raises the question of a geometric interpretation. Note that passing to cohomology classes is analogous to replacing a curve by a linear system.

Note that the self-intersection number can be negative, as the example below illustrates.

==== Examples ====
Consider a line L in the projective plane P^{2}: it has self-intersection number 1 since all other lines cross it once: one can push L off to L′, and L · L′ = 1 (for any choice) of L′, hence L · L = 1. In terms of intersection forms, we say the plane has one of type x^{2} (there is only one class of lines, and they all intersect with each other).

Note that on the affine plane, one might push off L to a parallel line, so (thinking geometrically) the number of intersection points depends on the choice of push-off. One says that “the affine plane does not have a good intersection theory”, and intersection theory on non-projective varieties is much more difficult.

A line on a P^{1} × P^{1} (which can also be interpreted as the non-singular quadric Q in P^{3}) has self-intersection 0, since a line can be moved off itself. (It is a ruled surface.) In terms of intersection forms, we say P^{1} × P^{1} has one of type xy – there are two basic classes of lines, which intersect each other in one point (xy), but have zero self-intersection (no x^{2} or y^{2} terms).

==== Blow-ups ====
A key example of self-intersection numbers is the exceptional curve of a blow-up, which is a central operation in birational geometry. Given an algebraic surface S, blowing up at a point creates a curve C. This curve C is recognisable by its genus, which is 0, and its self-intersection number, which is −1. (This is not obvious.) Note that as a corollary, P^{2} and P^{1} × P^{1} are minimal surfaces (they are not blow-ups), since they do not have any curves with negative self-intersection. In fact, Castelnuovo’s contraction theorem states the converse: every (−1)-curve is the exceptional curve of some blow-up (it can be “blown down”).

== See also ==
- Chow group
- Grothendieck–Riemann–Roch theorem
- Enumerative geometry
