= L-theory =

K-theory of quadratic forms

In mathematics, algebraic L-theory is the K-theory of quadratic forms; the term was coined by C. T. C. Wall, with L being used as the letter after K. Algebraic L-theory, also known as "Hermitian K-theory", is important in surgery theory.

== Definition ==
One can define L-groups for any ring with involution R: the quadratic L-groups $L_*(R)$ (Wall) and the symmetric L-groups $L^*(R)$ (Mishchenko, Ranicki).

=== Even dimension ===
The even-dimensional L-groups $L_{2k}(R)$ are defined as the Witt groups of ε-quadratic forms over the ring R with $\epsilon = (-1)^k$. More precisely,

$$L_{2k}(R)$$

is the abelian group of equivalence classes $[\psi]$ of non-degenerate ε-quadratic forms $\psi \in Q_\epsilon(F)$ over R, where the underlying R-modules F are finitely generated free. The equivalence relation is given by stabilization with respect to hyperbolic ε-quadratic forms:

$$[\psi] = [\psi'] \Longleftrightarrow n, n' \in {\mathbb N}_0: \psi \oplus H_{(-1)^k}(R)^n \cong \psi' \oplus H_{(-1)^k}(R)^{n'}$$.

The addition in $L_{2k}(R)$ is defined by

$$[\psi_1] + [\psi_2] := [\psi_1 \oplus \psi_2].$$

The zero element is represented by $H_{(-1)^k}(R)^n$ for any $n \in {\mathbb N}_0$. The inverse of $[\psi]$ is $[-\psi]$.

=== Odd dimension ===
Defining odd-dimensional L-groups is more complicated; further details and the definition of the odd-dimensional L-groups can be found in the references mentioned below.

== Examples and applications ==
The L-groups of a group $\pi$ are the L-groups $L_*(\mathbf{Z}[\pi])$ of the group ring $\mathbf{Z}[\pi]$. In the applications to topology $\pi$ is the fundamental group $\pi_1 (X)$ of a space $X$. The quadratic L-groups $L_*(\mathbf{Z}[\pi])$ play a central role in the surgery classification of the homotopy types of $n$-dimensional manifolds of dimension $n > 4$, and in the formulation of the Novikov conjecture.

The distinction between symmetric L-groups and quadratic L-groups, indicated by upper and lower indices, reflects the usage in group homology and cohomology. The group cohomology $H^*$ of the cyclic group $\mathbf{Z}_2$ deals with the fixed points of a $\mathbf{Z}_2$-action, while the group homology $H_*$ deals with the orbits of a $\mathbf{Z}_2$-action; compare $X^G$ (fixed points) and $X_G = X/G$ (orbits, quotient) for upper/lower index notation.

The quadratic L-groups: $L_n(R)$ and the symmetric L-groups: $L^n(R)$ are related by a symmetrization map $L_n(R) \to L^n(R)$ which is an isomorphism modulo 2-torsion, and which corresponds to the polarization identities.

The quadratic and the symmetric L-groups are 4-fold periodic (the comment of Ranicki, page 12, on the non-periodicity of the symmetric L-groups refers to another type of L-groups, defined using "short complexes").

In view of the applications to the classification of manifolds there are extensive calculations of the quadratic $L$-groups $L_*(\mathbf{Z}[\pi])$. For finite $\pi$ algebraic methods are used, and mostly geometric methods (e.g. controlled topology) are used for infinite $\pi$.

More generally, one can define L-groups for any additive category with a chain duality, as in Ranicki (section 1).

=== Integers ===
The simply connected L-groups are also the L-groups of the integers, as $L(e) := L(\mathbf{Z}[e]) = L(\mathbf{Z})$ for both $L$ = $L^*$ or $L_*.$ For quadratic L-groups, these are the surgery obstructions to simply connected surgery.

The quadratic L-groups of the integers are:

$$\begin{align}
L_{4k}(\mathbf{Z}) &= \mathbf{Z}   && \text{signature}/8\\
L_{4k+1}(\mathbf{Z}) &= 0\\
L_{4k+2}(\mathbf{Z}) &= \mathbf{Z}/2 && \text{Arf invariant}\\
L_{4k+3}(\mathbf{Z}) &= 0.
\end{align}$$

In doubly even dimension (4k), the quadratic L-groups detect the signature; in singly even dimension (4k+2), the L-groups detect the Arf invariant (topologically the Kervaire invariant).

The symmetric L-groups of the integers are:

$$\begin{align}
L^{4k}(\mathbf{Z}) &= \mathbf{Z} && \text{signature}\\
L^{4k+1}(\mathbf{Z}) &= \mathbf{Z}/2 && \text{de Rham invariant}\\
L^{4k+2}(\mathbf{Z}) &= 0\\
L^{4k+3}(\mathbf{Z}) &= 0.
\end{align}$$

In doubly even dimension (4k), the symmetric L-groups, as with the quadratic L-groups, detect the signature; in dimension (4k+1), the L-groups detect the de Rham invariant.
