= Ε-quadratic form =

Mathematical concept

In mathematics, specifically the theory of quadratic forms, an ε-quadratic form is a generalization of quadratic forms to skew-symmetric settings and to *-rings; ε = ±1, accordingly for symmetric or skew-symmetric. They are also called $(-)^n$-quadratic forms, particularly in the context of surgery theory.

There is the related notion of ε-symmetric forms, which generalizes symmetric forms, skew-symmetric forms (= symplectic forms), Hermitian forms, and skew-Hermitian forms. More briefly, one may refer to quadratic, skew-quadratic, symmetric, and skew-symmetric forms, where "skew" means (−) and the * (involution) is implied.

The theory is 2-local: away from 2, ε-quadratic forms are equivalent to ε-symmetric forms: half the symmetrization map (below) gives an explicit isomorphism.

== Definition ==
ε-symmetric forms and ε-quadratic forms are defined as follows.

Given a module M over a *-ring R, let B(M) be the space of bilinear forms on M, and let T : B(M) → B(M) be the "conjugate transpose" involution B(u, v) ↦ B(v, u)*. Since multiplication by −1 is also an involution and commutes with linear maps, −T is also an involution. Thus we can write ε = ±1 and εT is an involution, either T or −T (ε can be more general than ±1; see below). Define the ε-symmetric forms as the invariants of εT, and the ε-quadratic forms are the coinvariants.

As an exact sequence,

$$0 \to Q^\varepsilon(M) \to B(M) \stackrel{1-\varepsilon T}{\longrightarrow} B(M) \to Q_\varepsilon(M) \to 0$$

As kernel and cokernel,

$$Q^\varepsilon(M) := \mbox{ker}\,(1-\varepsilon T)$$
$$Q_\varepsilon(M) := \mbox{coker}\,(1-\varepsilon T)$$

The notation Q^{ε}(M), Q_{ε}(M) follows the standard notation M^{G}, M_{G} for the invariants and coinvariants for a group action, here of the order 2 group (an involution).

Composition of the inclusion and quotient maps (but not 1 − εT) as $Q^\varepsilon(M) \to B(M) \to Q_\varepsilon(M)$ yields a map Q^{ε}(M) → Q_{ε}(M): every ε-symmetric form determines an ε-quadratic form.

=== Symmetrization ===
Conversely, one can define a reverse homomorphism "1 + εT": Q_{ε}(M) → Q^{ε}(M), called the symmetrization map (since it yields a symmetric form) by taking any lift of a quadratic form and multiplying it by 1 + εT. This is a symmetric form because (1 − εT)(1 + εT) = 1 − T^{2} = 0, so it is in the kernel. More precisely, $(1 + \varepsilon T)B(M) < Q^\varepsilon(M)$. The map is well-defined by the same equation: choosing a different lift corresponds to adding a multiple of (1 − εT), but this vanishes after multiplying by 1 + εT. Thus every ε-quadratic form determines an ε-symmetric form.

Composing these two maps either way: Q^{ε}(M) → Q_{ε}(M) → Q^{ε}(M) or Q_{ε}(M) → Q^{ε}(M) → Q_{ε}(M) yields multiplication by 2, and thus these maps are bijective if 2 is invertible in R, with the inverse given by multiplication with 1/2.

An ε-quadratic form ψ ∈ Q_{ε}(M) is called non-degenerate if the associated ε-symmetric form (1 + εT)(ψ) is non-degenerate.

=== Generalization from * ===
If the * is trivial, then ε = ±1, and "away from 2" means that 2 is invertible: 1/2 ∈ R.

More generally, one can take for ε ∈ R any element such that ε*ε = 1. ε = ±1 always satisfy this, but so does any element of norm 1, such as complex numbers of unit norm.

Similarly, in the presence of a non-trivial *, ε-symmetric forms are equivalent to ε-quadratic forms if there is an element λ ∈ R such that λ* + λ = 1. If * is trivial, this is equivalent to 2λ = 1 or λ = 1/2, while if * is non-trivial there can be multiple possible λ; for example, over the complex numbers any number with real part 1/2 is such a λ.

For instance, in the ring $R=\mathbf{Z}\left[\textstyle{\frac{1+i}{2}}\right]$ (the integral lattice for the quadratic form 2x^{2} − 2x + 1), with complex conjugation, $\lambda=\textstyle{\frac{1\pm i}{2}}$ are two such elements, though 1/2 ∉ R.

== Intuition ==
In terms of matrices (we take V to be 2-dimensional), if * is trivial:

- matrices
  $$\begin{pmatrix}a & b\\c & d\end{pmatrix}$$
  correspond to bilinear forms
- the subspace of symmetric matrices
  $$\begin{pmatrix}a & b\\b & c\end{pmatrix}$$
  correspond to symmetric forms
- the subspace of (−1)-symmetric matrices
  $$\begin{pmatrix}0 & b\\-b & 0\end{pmatrix}$$
  correspond to symplectic forms
- the bilinear form
  $$\begin{pmatrix}a & b\\c & d\end{pmatrix}$$
  yields the quadratic form

$$ax^2 + bxy+cyx + dy^2 = ax^2 + (b+c)xy + dy^2\,$$,

- the map 1 + T from quadratic forms to symmetric forms maps $ex^2 + fxy + gy^2$

to
$$\begin{pmatrix}2e & f\\f & 2g\end{pmatrix}$$
, for example by lifting to
$$\begin{pmatrix}e & f\\0 & g\end{pmatrix}$$
and then adding to transpose. Mapping back to quadratic forms yields double the original: $2ex^2 + 2fxy + 2gy^2 = 2(ex^2 + fxy + gy^2)$.

If $\bar{\cdot }$ is complex conjugation, then

- the subspace of symmetric matrices are the Hermitian matrices
  $$\begin{pmatrix}a & z\\ \bar z & c\end{pmatrix}$$
- the subspace of skew-symmetric matrices are the skew-Hermitian matrices
  $$\begin{pmatrix}bi & z\\ -\bar z & di\end{pmatrix}$$

=== Refinements ===
An intuitive way to understand an ε-quadratic form is to think of it as a quadratic refinement of its associated ε-symmetric form.

For instance, in defining a Clifford algebra over a general field or ring, one quotients the tensor algebra by relations coming from the symmetric form and the quadratic form: vw + wv = 2B(v, w) and $v^2=Q(v)$. If 2 is invertible, this second relation follows from the first (as the quadratic form can be recovered from the associated bilinear form), but at 2 this additional refinement is necessary.

== Examples ==
An easy example for an ε-quadratic form is the standard hyperbolic ε-quadratic form $H_\varepsilon(R) \in Q_\varepsilon(R \oplus R^*)$. (Here, R* := Hom_{R}(R, R) denotes the dual of the R-module R.) It is given by the bilinear form $((v_1,f_1),(v_2,f_2)) \mapsto f_2(v_1)$. The standard hyperbolic ε-quadratic form is needed for the definition of L-theory.

For the field of two elements R = F_{2} there is no difference between (+1)-quadratic and (−1)-quadratic forms, which are just called quadratic forms. The Arf invariant of a nonsingular quadratic form over F_{2} is an F_{2}-valued invariant with important applications in both algebra and topology, and plays a role similar to that played by the discriminant of a quadratic form in characteristic not equal to two.

=== Manifolds ===
The free part of the middle homology group (with integer coefficients) of an oriented even-dimensional manifold has an ε-symmetric form, via Poincaré duality, the intersection form. In the case of singly even dimension 4k + 2, this is skew-symmetric, while for doubly even dimension 4k, this is symmetric. Geometrically this corresponds to intersection, where two n/2-dimensional submanifolds in an n-dimensional manifold generically intersect in a 0-dimensional submanifold (a set of points), by adding codimension. For singly even dimension the order switches sign, while for doubly even dimension order does not change sign, hence the ε-symmetry. The simplest cases are for the product of spheres, where the product S^{2k} × S^{2k} and S^{2k+1} × S^{2k+1} respectively give the symmetric form $\left(\begin{smallmatrix} 0 & 1\\ 1 & 0\end{smallmatrix}\right)$ and skew-symmetric form $\left(\begin{smallmatrix} 0 & 1\\ -1 & 0\end{smallmatrix}\right).$ In dimension two, this yields a torus, and taking the connected sum of g tori yields the surface of genus g, whose middle homology has the standard hyperbolic form.

With additional structure, this ε-symmetric form can be refined to an ε-quadratic form. For doubly even dimension this is integer valued, while for singly even dimension this is only defined up to parity, and takes values in Z/2. For example, given a framed manifold, one can produce such a refinement. For singly even dimension, the Arf invariant of this skew-quadratic form is the Kervaire invariant.

Given an oriented surface Σ embedded in R^{3}, the middle homology group H_{1}(Σ) carries not only a skew-symmetric form (via intersection), but also a skew-quadratic form, which can be seen as a quadratic refinement, via self-linking. The skew-symmetric form is an invariant of the surface Σ, whereas the skew-quadratic form is an invariant of the embedding Σ ⊂ R^{3}, e.g. for the Seifert surface of a knot. The Arf invariant of the skew-quadratic form is a framed cobordism invariant generating the first stable homotopy group $\pi^s_1$.

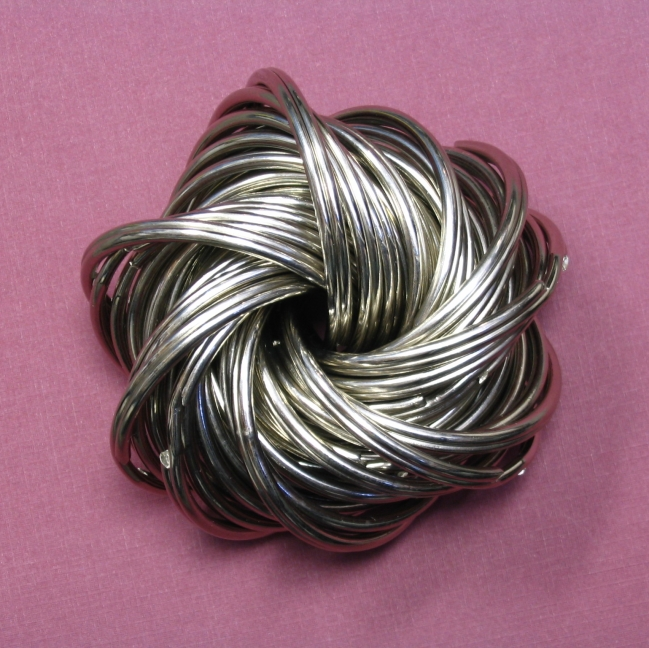
In the standard embedding of the torus, a (1, 1) curve self-links, thus Q(1, 1) = 1.

For the standard embedded torus, the skew-symmetric form is given by $\left(\begin{smallmatrix}0 & 1\\-1 & 0\end{smallmatrix}\right)$ (with respect to the standard symplectic basis), and the skew-quadratic refinement is given by xy with respect to this basis: Q(1, 0) = Q(0, 1) = 0: the basis curves don't self-link; and Q(1, 1) = 1: a (1, 1) self-links, as in the Hopf fibration. (This form has Arf invariant 0, and thus this embedded torus has Kervaire invariant 0.)

== Applications ==
A key application is in algebraic surgery theory, where even L-groups are defined as Witt groups of ε-quadratic forms, by C.T.C.Wall
