= De Rham invariant =

Mod 2 invariant of (4k+1)-dimensional manifold

In geometric topology, the de Rham invariant is a mod 2 invariant of a (4k+1)-dimensional manifold, that is, an element of $\mathbf{Z}/2$ – either 0 or 1. It can be thought of as the simply-connected symmetric L-group $L^{4k+1},$ and thus analogous to the other invariants from L-theory: the signature, a 4k-dimensional invariant (either symmetric or quadratic, $L^{4k} \cong L_{4k}$), and the Kervaire invariant, a (4k+2)-dimensional quadratic invariant $L_{4k+2}.$

It is named for Swiss mathematician Georges de Rham, and used in surgery theory.

== Definition ==
The de Rham invariant of a (4k+1)-dimensional manifold can be defined in various equivalent ways:

- the rank of the 2-torsion in $H_{2k}(M),$ as an integer mod 2;
- the Stiefel–Whitney number $w_2w_{4k-1}$;
- the (squared) Wu number, $v_{2k}Sq^1v_{2k},$ where $v_{2k} \in H^{2k}(M;Z_2)$ is the Wu class of the normal bundle of $M$ and $Sq^1$ is the Steenrod square; formally, as with all characteristic numbers, this is evaluated on the fundamental class: $(v_{2k}Sq^1v_{2k},[M])$;
- in terms of a semicharacteristic.
