= Kervaire manifold =

Piecewise-linear manifold

In mathematics, specifically in differential topology, a Kervaire manifold $K^{4n+2}$ is a piecewise-linear manifold of dimension $4n+2$ constructed by Michel Kervaire (1960) by plumbing together the tangent bundles of two $(2n+1)$-spheres, and then gluing a ball to the result. In 10 dimensions this gives a piecewise-linear manifold with no smooth structure.

== See also ==
- Exotic sphere
