= Michel Kervaire =

French mathematician (1927–2007)

- Born: 26 April 1927; Częstochowa, Poland
- Died: 19 November 2007 (aged 80); Geneva, Switzerland
- Citizenship: France
- Education: ETH Zurich
- Known for: Kervaire invariant Kervaire manifold Kervaire semi-characteristic
- Scientific career
- Fields: Mathematics
- Workplaces: New York University; University of Geneva
- Thesis: Courbure intégrale généralisée et homotopie (1956)
- Doctoral advisor: Heinz Hopf; Beno Eckmann
- Doctoral students: Eva Bayer-Fluckiger; Frank Quinn

Michel André Kervaire (26 April 1927 – 19 November 2007) was a French mathematician who made significant contributions to topology and algebra.

He introduced the Kervaire semi-characteristic. He was the first to show the existence of topological n-manifolds with no differentiable structure (using the Kervaire invariant), and (with John Milnor) computed the number of exotic spheres in dimensions greater than four, known as Kervaire–Milnor groups. He is also well known for fundamental contributions to high-dimensional knot theory. The solution of the Kervaire invariant problem was announced by Michael Hopkins in Edinburgh on 21 April 2009.

== Education ==
He was the son of André Kervaire (a French industrialist) and Nelly Derancourt. After completing high school in France, Kervaire pursued his studies at ETH Zurich (1947–1952), receiving a Ph.D. in 1955. His thesis, entitled Courbure intégrale généralisée et homotopie, was written under the direction of Heinz Hopf and Beno Eckmann.

== Career ==
Kervaire was a professor at New York University's Courant Institute from 1959 to 1971, and then at the University of Geneva from 1971 to 1997, when he retired. He received an honorary doctorate from the University of Neuchâtel in 1986; he was also an honorary member of the Swiss Mathematical Society.

== See also ==
- Homology sphere
- Kervaire manifold
- Plus construction

== Selected publications ==
- — (1960), "A manifold which does not admit any differentiable structure", Commentarii Mathematici Helvetici, 34: 257–270, doi:10.1007/BF02565940, MR 0139172, S2CID 120977898
- —; Milnor, John W. (1963). "Groups of homotopy spheres: I" (PDF). Annals of Mathematics. 77 (3). Princeton University Press: 504–537. doi:10.2307/1970128. JSTOR 1970128. MR 0148075. This paper describes the structure of the group of smooth structures on an n-sphere for n > 4.
- — (1965), "Les nœuds de dimensions supérieures", Bulletin de la Société Mathématique de France, 93: 225–271, doi:10.24033/bsmf.1624, MR 0189052
- — (1969), "Smooth homology spheres and their fundamental groups", Transactions of the American Mathematical Society, 144: 67–72, doi:10.2307/1995269, JSTOR 1995269, MR 0253347
- —; Eliahou, Shalom (1990), "Minimal resolutions of some monomial ideals", Journal of Algebra, 129 (1): 1–25, doi:10.1016/0021-8693(90)90237-I, MR 1037391
