= Parallelizable manifold =

Type of differentiable manifold

In mathematics, a differentiable manifold $M$ of dimension n is called parallelizable if there exist smooth vector fields
$$\{V_1, \ldots,V_n\}$$
on the manifold, such that at every point $p$ of $M$ the tangent vectors
$$\{V_1(p), \ldots, V_n(p)\}$$
provide a basis of the tangent space at $p$. Equivalently, the tangent bundle is a trivial bundle, so that the associated principal bundle of linear frames has a global section on $M.$

A particular choice of such a basis of vector fields on $M$ is called a parallelization (or an absolute parallelism) of $M$.

== Examples ==
- An example with $n = 1$ is the circle: we can take V_{1} to be the unit tangent vector field, say pointing in the anti-clockwise direction. The torus of dimension $n$ is also parallelizable, as can be seen by expressing it as a cartesian product of circles. For example, take $n = 2,$ and construct a torus from a square of graph paper with opposite edges glued together, to get an idea of the two tangent directions at each point. More generally, every Lie group G is parallelizable, since a basis for the tangent space at the identity element can be moved around by the action of the translation group of G on G (every translation is a diffeomorphism and therefore these translations induce linear isomorphisms between tangent spaces of points in G).
- A classical problem was to determine which of the spheres S^{n} are parallelizable. The zero-dimensional case S^{0} is trivially parallelizable. The case S^{1} is the circle, which is parallelizable as has already been explained. The hairy ball theorem shows that S^{2} is not parallelizable. However S^{3} is parallelizable, since it is the Lie group SU(2). The only other parallelizable sphere is S^{7}; this was proved in 1958, by Friedrich Hirzebruch, Michel Kervaire, and by Raoul Bott and John Milnor, in independent work. The parallelizable spheres correspond precisely to elements of unit norm in the normed division algebras of the real numbers, complex numbers, quaternions, and octonions, which allows one to construct a parallelism for each. Proving that other spheres are not parallelizable is more difficult, and requires algebraic topology.
- The product of parallelizable manifolds is parallelizable.
- Every orientable closed three-dimensional manifold is parallelizable.

== Remarks ==
- Any parallelizable manifold is orientable.
- The term framed manifold (occasionally rigged manifold) is most usually applied to an embedded manifold with a given trivialisation of the normal bundle, and also for an abstract (that is, non-embedded) manifold with a given stable trivialisation of the tangent bundle.
- A related notion is the concept of a π-manifold. A smooth manifold $M$ is called a π-manifold if, when embedded in a high dimensional euclidean space, its normal bundle is trivial. In particular, every parallelizable manifold is a π-manifold.

== See also ==
- Chart (topology)
- Differentiable manifold
- Frame bundle
- Kervaire invariant
- Orthonormal frame bundle
- Principal bundle
- Connection (mathematics)
- G-structure
