= Exceptional object =

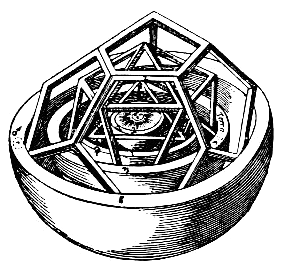
The Platonic solids, seen here in an illustration from Johannes Kepler's Mysterium Cosmographicum (1596), are an early example of exceptional objects. The symmetries of three-dimensional space can be classified into two infinite families—the cyclic and dihedral symmetries of n-sided polygons—and five exceptional types of symmetry, namely the symmetry groups of the Platonic solids.

In mathematics, an exceptional object is one of finitely many exceptions to some classification of objects. Many branches of mathematics study objects of a given type and prove a classification theorem. A common theme is that the classification results in a number of series of objects and a finite number of exceptions — often with desirable properties — that do not fit into any series; these are known as exceptional objects. In many cases, these exceptional objects play a further and important role in the subject. Furthermore, the exceptional objects in one branch of mathematics often relate to the exceptional objects in others.

A related phenomenon is exceptional isomorphism, when two series are in general different, but agree for some small values. For example, spin groups in low dimensions are isomorphic to other classical Lie groups.

== Regular polytopes ==
The prototypical examples of exceptional objects arise in the classification of regular polytopes: in two dimensions, there is a series of regular n-gons for n ≥ 3. In every dimension above 2, one can find analogues of the cube, tetrahedron and octahedron. In three dimensions, one finds two more regular polyhedra — the dodecahedron (12-hedron) and the icosahedron (20-hedron) — making five Platonic solids. In four dimensions, a total of six regular polytopes exist, including the 120-cell, the 600-cell and the 24-cell. There are no other regular polytopes, as the only regular polytopes in higher dimensions are of the hypercube, simplex, orthoplex series. In all dimensions combined, there are therefore three series and five exceptional polytopes.

Moreover, the pattern is similar if non-convex polytopes are included: in two dimensions, there is a regular star polygon for every rational number $\textstyle p/q>2$. In three dimensions, there are four Kepler–Poinsot polyhedra, and in four dimensions, ten Schläfli–Hess polychora; in higher dimensions, there are no non-convex regular figures.

These can be generalized to tessellations of other spaces, especially uniform tessellations, notably tilings of Euclidean space (honeycombs), which have exceptional objects, and tilings of hyperbolic space. There are various exceptional objects in dimension below 6, but in dimension 6 and above, the only regular polyhedra/tilings/hyperbolic tilings are the simplex, hypercube, cross-polytope, and hypercube lattice.

=== Schwarz triangles ===
(3 3 2)	(4 3 2)	(5 3 2)
(3 3 3)	(4 4 2)	(6 3 2)

Related to tilings and the regular polyhedra, there are exceptional Schwarz triangles (triangles that tile the sphere, or more generally Euclidean plane or hyperbolic plane via their triangle group of reflections in their edges), particularly the Möbius triangles. In the sphere, there are 3 Möbius triangles (and 1 1-parameter family), corresponding to the 3 exceptional Platonic solid groups, while in the Euclidean plane, there are 3 Möbius triangles, corresponding to the 3 special triangles: 60-60-60 (equilateral), 45-45-90 (isosceles right), and 30-60-90. There are additional exceptional Schwarz triangles in the sphere and Euclidean plane. By contrast, in the hyperbolic plane, there is a 3-parameter family of Möbius triangles, and none exceptional.

== Finite simple groups ==
The relations between the sporadic groups, most being related to the monster.

The finite simple groups have been classified into a number of series as well as 26 sporadic groups. Of these, 20 are subgroups or subquotients of the monster group, referred to as the "Happy Family", while 6 are not, and are referred to as "pariahs".

Several of the sporadic groups are related to the Leech lattice, most notably the Conway group Co_{1}, which is the automorphism group of the Leech lattice, quotiented out by its center.

== Division algebras ==
There are only three finite-dimensional associative division algebras over the reals — the real numbers, the complex numbers and the quaternions. The only non-associative division algebra is the algebra of octonions. The octonions are connected to a wide variety of exceptional objects. For example, the exceptional formally real Jordan algebra is the Albert algebra of 3×3 self-adjoint matrices over the octonions.

== Simple Lie groups ==
The simple Lie groups form a number of series (classical Lie groups) labelled A, B, C and D. In addition, there are the exceptional groups G_{2} (the automorphism group of the octonions), F_{4}, E_{6}, E_{7}, E_{8}. These last four groups can be viewed as the symmetry groups of projective planes over O, C⊗O, H⊗O and O⊗O, respectively, where O is the octonions and the tensor products are over the reals.

The classification of Lie groups corresponds to the classification of root systems, and thus the exceptional Lie groups correspond to exceptional root systems and exceptional Dynkin diagrams.

== Supersymmetric algebras ==
There are a few exceptional objects with supersymmetry. The classification of superalgebras by Kac and Tierry-Mieg indicates that the Lie superalgebras G(3) in 31 dimensions and F(4) in 40 dimensions, and the Jordan superalgebras K_{3} and K_{10}, are examples of exceptional objects.

== Unimodular lattices ==
Up to isometry, there is only one even unimodular lattice in 15 dimensions or less — the E_{8} lattice. Up to dimension 24, there is only one even unimodular lattice without roots, the Leech lattice. Three of the sporadic simple groups were discovered by Conway while investigating the automorphism group of the Leech lattice. For example, Co_{1} is the automorphism group itself modulo ±1. The groups Co_{2} and Co_{3}, as well as a number of other sporadic groups, arise as stabilisers of various subsets of the Leech lattice.

== Codes ==
Some codes also stand out as exceptional objects, in particular the perfect binary Golay code, which is closely related to the Leech lattice. The Mathieu group $M_{24}$, one of the sporadic simple groups, is the group of automorphisms of the extended binary Golay code, and four more of the sporadic simple groups arise as various types of stabilizer subgroup of $M_{24}$.

== Block designs ==
An exceptional block design is the Steiner system S(5,8,24) whose automorphism group is the sporadic simple Mathieu group $M_{24}$.

The codewords of the extended binary Golay code have a length of 24 bits and have weights 0, 8, 12, 16, or 24. This code can correct up to three errors. So every 24-bit word with weight 5 can be corrected to a codeword with weight 8. The bits of a 24-bit word can be thought of as specifying the possible subsets of a 24 element set. So the extended binary Golay code gives a unique 8 element subset for each 5 element subset. In fact, it defines S(5,8,24).

== Outer automorphisms ==
Certain families of groups often have a certain outer automorphism group, but in particular cases, they have other exceptional outer automorphisms.

Among families of finite simple groups, the only example is in the automorphisms of the symmetric and alternating groups: for $n \geq 3, n \neq 6$ the alternating group $A_n$ has one outer automorphism (corresponding to conjugation by an odd element of $S_n$) and the symmetric group $S_n$ has no outer automorphisms. However, for $n=6,$ there is an exceptional outer automorphism of $S_6$ (of order 2), and correspondingly, the outer automorphism group of $A_6$ is not $C_2$ (the group of order 2), but rather $C_2 \times C_2$, the Klein four-group.

If one instead considers $A_6$ as the (isomorphic) projective special linear group $\operatorname{PSL}(2,9)$, then the outer automorphism is not exceptional; thus the exceptional-ness can be seen as due to the exceptional isomorphism $A_6 \cong \operatorname{PSL}(2,9).$ This exceptional outer automorphism is realized inside of the Mathieu group $M_{12}$ and similarly, $M_{12}$ acts on a set of 12 elements in 2 different ways.

The Tutte–Coxeter graph: the symmetries of this graph are the automorphisms of S_{6}. The exceptional automorphism corresponds to swapping the colors of the blue and red vertices.

The symmetries of the Dynkin diagram D_{4} correspond to the outer automorphisms of Spin(8) in triality.

Among Lie groups, the spin group $\operatorname{Spin}(8)$ has an exceptionally large outer automorphism group (namely $S_3$), which corresponds to the exceptional symmetries of the Dynkin diagram $D_4$. This phenomenon is referred to as triality.

The exceptional symmetry of the $D_4$ diagram also gives rise to the Steinberg groups.

== Algebraic topology ==
The Kervaire invariant is an invariant of a (4k + 2)-dimensional manifold that measures whether the manifold could be surgically converted into a sphere. This invariant evaluates to 0 if the manifold can be converted to a sphere, and 1 otherwise. More specifically, the Kervaire invariant applies to a framed manifold, that is, to a manifold equipped with an embedding into Euclidean space and a trivialization of the normal bundle. The Kervaire invariant problem is the problem of determining in which dimensions the Kervaire invariant can be nonzero. For differentiable manifolds, this can happen in dimensions 2, 6, 14, 30, 62, and possibly 126, and in no other dimensions. The final case of dimension 126 remains open. These five or six framed cobordism classes of manifolds having Kervaire invariant 1 are exceptional objects related to exotic spheres. The first three cases are related to the complex numbers, quaternions and octonions respectively: a manifold of Kervaire invariant 1 can be constructed as the product of two spheres, with its exotic framing determined by the normed division algebra.

Due to similarities of dimensions, it is conjectured that the remaining cases (dimensions 30, 62 and 126) are related to the Rosenfeld projective planes, which are defined over algebras constructed from the octonions. Specifically, it has been conjectured that there is a construction that takes these projective planes and produces a manifold with nonzero Kervaire invariant in two dimensions lower, but this remains unconfirmed.

== Symmetric quantum measurements ==
In quantum information theory, there exist structures known as SIC-POVMs or SICs, which correspond to maximal sets of complex equiangular lines. Some of the known SICs—those in vector spaces of 2 and 3 dimensions, as well as certain solutions in 8 dimensions—are considered exceptional objects and called "sporadic SICs". They differ from the other known SICs in ways that involve their symmetry groups, the Galois theory of the numerical values of their vector components, and so forth. The sporadic SICs in dimension 8 are related to the integral octonions.

== Connections ==
Numerous connections have been observed between some, though not all, of these exceptional objects. Most common are objects related to 8 and 24 dimensions, noting that 24 = 8 · 3. By contrast, the pariah groups stand apart, as the name suggests.

=== 8 and 24 dimensions ===
Exceptional objects related to the number 8 include the following.

- The octonions are 8-dimensional.
- The E_{8} lattice can be realized as the integral octonions (up to a scale factor).
- The exceptional Lie groups can be seen as symmetries of the octonions and structures derived from the octonions; further, the E_{8} algebra is related to the E_{8} lattice, as the notation implies (the lattice is generated by the root system of the algebra).
- Triality occurs for Spin(8), which also connects to 8 · 3 = 24.

Likewise, exceptional objects related to the number 24 include the following.

- The Leech lattice is 24-dimensional.
- Most sporadic simple groups can be related to the Leech lattice, or more broadly the Monster.
- The exceptional Jordan algebra has a representation in terms of 24×24 real matrices together with the Jordan product rule.

These objects are connected to various other phenomena in math which may be considered surprising but not themselves "exceptional". For example, in algebraic topology, 8-fold real Bott periodicity can be seen as coming from the octonions. In the theory of modular forms, the 24-dimensional nature of the Leech lattice underlies the presence of 24 in the formulas for the Dedekind eta function and the modular discriminant, which connection is deepened by Monstrous moonshine, a development that related modular functions to the Monster group.

=== Physics ===
In string theory and superstring theory we often find that particular dimensions are singled out as a result of exceptional algebraic phenomena. For example, bosonic string theory requires a spacetime of dimension 26 which is directly related to the presence of 24 in the Dedekind eta function. Similarly, the possible dimensions of supergravity are related to the dimensions of the division algebras.

=== Monstrous moonshine ===
Many of the exceptional objects in mathematics and physics have been found to be connected to each other. Developments such as the Monstrous moonshine conjectures show how, for example, the Monster group is connected to string theory. The theory of modular forms shows how the algebra E_{8} is connected to the Monster group. (In fact, well before the proof of the Monstrous moonshine conjecture, the elliptic j-function was discovered to encode the representations of E_{8}.) Other interesting connections include how the Leech lattice is connected via the Golay code to the adjacency matrix of the dodecahedron (another exceptional object). Below is a mind map showing how some of the exceptional objects in mathematics and mathematical physics are related.

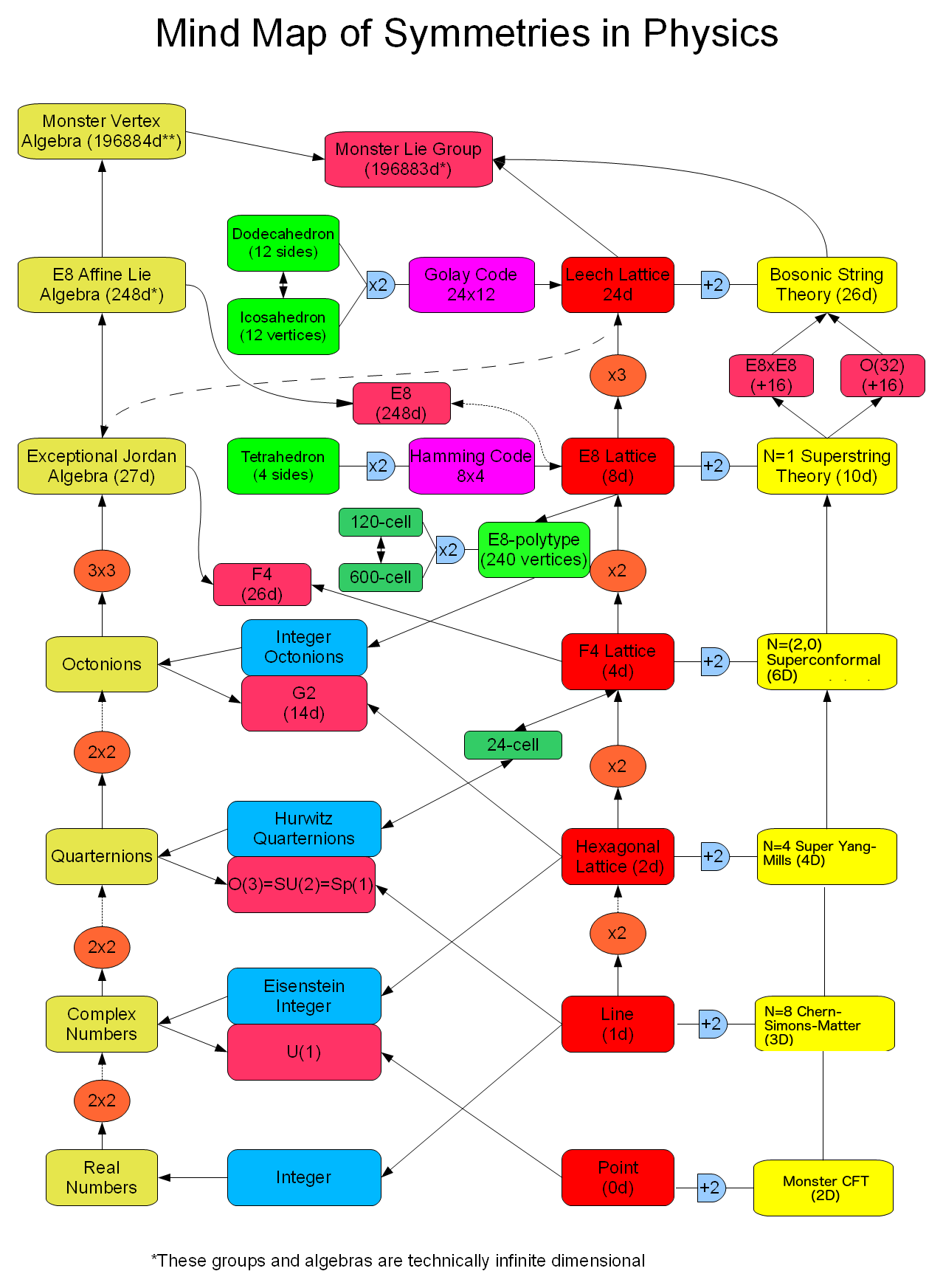

The connections can partly be explained by thinking of the algebras as a tower of lattice vertex operator algebras. It just so happens that the vertex algebras at the bottom are so simple that they are isomorphic to familiar non-vertex algebras. Thus the connections can be seen simply as the consequence of some lattices being sub-lattices of others.

=== Supersymmetries ===
The Jordan superalgebras are a parallel set of exceptional objects with supersymmetry. These are the Lie superalgebras which are related to Lorentzian lattices. This subject is less explored, and the connections between the objects are less well established. There are new conjectures parallel to the Monstrous moonshine conjectures for these super-objects, involving different sporadic groups.

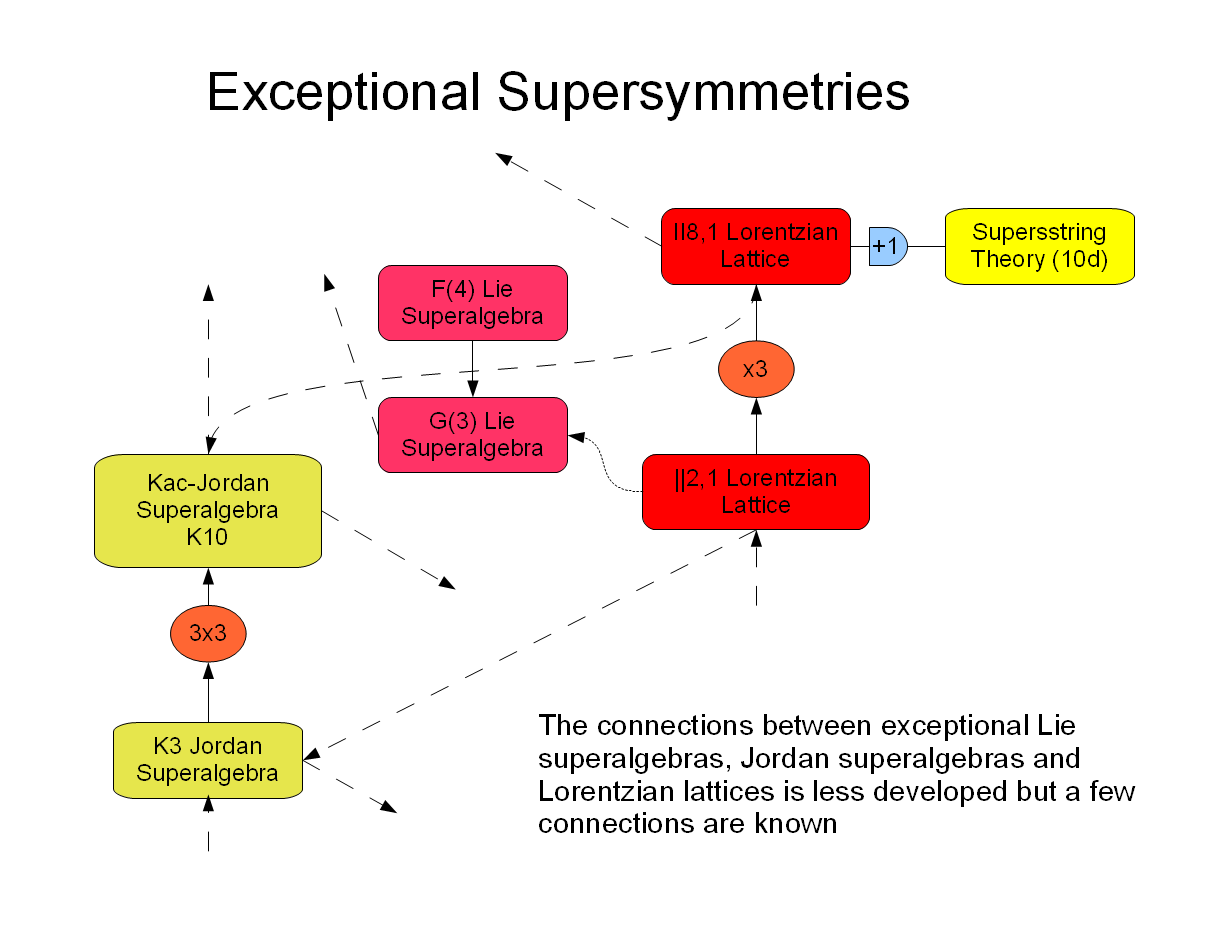

== Unexceptional objects ==
=== Pathologies ===
"Exceptional" object is reserved for objects that are unusual, meaning rare, the exception, not for unexpected or non-standard objects. These unexpected-but-typical (or common) phenomena are generally referred to as pathological, such as nowhere differentiable functions, or "exotic", as in exotic spheres — there are exotic spheres in arbitrarily high dimension (not only a finite set of exceptions), and in many dimensions most (differential structures on) spheres are exotic.

=== Extremal objects ===
Exceptional objects must be distinguished from extremal objects: those that fall in a family and are the most extreme example by some measure are of interest, but not unusual in the way exceptional objects are. For example, the golden ratio φ has the simplest continued fraction approximation, and accordingly is most difficult to approximate by rationals; however, it is but one of infinitely many such quadratic numbers (continued fractions).

Similarly, the (2,3,7) Schwarz triangle is the smallest hyperbolic Schwarz triangle, and the associated (2,3,7) triangle group is of particular interest, being the universal Hurwitz group, and thus being associated with the Hurwitz curves, the maximally symmetric algebraic curves. However, it falls in a family of such triangles ((2,4,7), (2,3,8), (3,3,7), etc.), and while the smallest, is not exceptional or unlike the others.

== See also ==
- Exceptional isomorphism
