= II25,1 =

In mathematics, II_{25,1} is the even 26-dimensional Lorentzian unimodular lattice. It has several unusual properties, arising from Conway's discovery that it has Weyl vector with norm zero. In particular, it is closely related to the Leech lattice, and has the Conway group Co1 at the top of its automorphism group.

== Construction ==
Write R^{m,n} for the m+n-dimensional vector space R^{m+n} with the inner product of (a_{1},...,a_{m+n}) and (b_{1},...,b_{m+n}) given by

a_{1}b_{1}+...+a_{m}b_{m} − a_{m+1}b_{m+1} − ... − a_{m+n}b_{m+n}.

The lattice II_{25,1} is given by all vectors (a_{1},...,a_{26}) in R^{25,1} such that either all the a_{i} are integers or they are all half-integers, and their sum is even.

== Reflection group ==
The lattice II_{25,1} is isomorphic to Λ⊕H where:

- Λ is the Leech lattice,
- H is the 2-dimensional even Lorentzian lattice, generated by 2 norm 0 vectors z and w with inner product –1,

and the two summands are orthogonal. So we can write vectors of II_{25,1} as (λ,m, n) = λ+mz+nw with λ in Λ and m,n integers, where (λ,m, n) has norm λ^{2} –2mn. To give explicitly the isomorphism, let $w = (0,1,2,3,\dots,22,23,24; 70)$, and $z = (1,0,2,3,\dots,22,23,24; 70)$, so that the subspace $H$ generated by $w$ and $z$ is the 2-dimensional even Lorentzian lattice. Then $H^\perp$ is isomorphic to $w^\perp/w$ and we recover one of the definitions of Λ.

Conway showed that the roots (norm 2 vectors) having inner product –1 with w=(0,0,1) are the simple roots of the reflection group. These are the vectors (λ,1,λ^{2}/2–1) for λ in the Leech lattice. In other words, the simple roots can be identified with the points of the Leech lattice, and moreover this is an isometry from the set of simple roots to the Leech lattice.

The reflection group is a hyperbolic reflection group acting on 25-dimensional hyperbolic space. The fundamental domain of the reflection group has 1+23+284 orbits of vertices as follows:

- One vertex at infinity corresponding to the norm 0 Weyl vector.
- 23 orbits of vertices at infinity meeting a finite number of faces of the fundamental domain. These vertices correspond to the deep holes of the Leech lattice, and there are 23 orbits of these corresponding to the 23 Niemeier lattices other than the Leech lattice. The simple roots meeting one of these vertices form an affine Dynkin diagram of rank 24.
- 284 orbits of vertices in hyperbolic space. These correspond to the 284 orbits of shallow holes of the Leech lattice. The simple roots meeting any of these vertices form a spherical Dynkin diagram of rank 25.

== Automorphism group ==
Conway (1983) described the automorphism group Aut(II_{25,1}) of II_{25,1} as follows.

- First of all, Aut(II_{25,1}) is the product of a group of order 2 generated by –1 by the index 2 subgroup Aut^{+}(II_{25,1}) of automorphisms preserving the direction of time.
- The group Aut^{+}(II_{25,1}) has a normal subgroup Ref generated by its reflections, whose simple roots correspond to the Leech lattice vectors.
- The group Aut^{+}(II_{25,1})/Ref is isomorphic to the group of affine automorphisms of the Leech lattice Λ, and so has a normal subgroup of translations isomorphic to Λ=Z^{24}, and the quotient is isomorphic to the group of all automorphisms of the Leech lattice, which is a double cover of the Conway group Co_{1}, a sporadic simple group.

== Vectors ==
Every non-zero vector of II_{25,1} can be written uniquely as a positive integer multiple of a primitive vector, so to classify all vectors it is sufficient to classify the primitive vectors.

=== Positive norm vectors ===
Any two positive norm primitive vectors with the same norm are conjugate under the automorphism group.

=== Norm zero vectors ===
There are 24 orbits of primitive norm 0 vectors, corresponding to the 24 Niemeier lattices. The correspondence is given as follows: if z is a norm 0 vector, then the lattice z^{⊥}/z is a 24-dimensional even unimodular lattice and is therefore one of the Niemeier lattices.

The Niemeier lattice corresponding to the norm 0 Weyl vector of the reflection group of II_{25,1} is the Leech lattice.

=== Norm –2 vectors ===
There are 121 orbits of vectors v of norm –2, corresponding to the 121 isomorphism classes of 25-dimensional even lattices L of determinant 2. In this correspondence, the lattice L is isomorphic to the orthogonal complement of the vector v.

=== Norm –4 vectors ===
There are 665 orbits of vectors v of norm –4, corresponding to the 665 isomorphism classes of 25-dimensional unimodular lattices L. In this correspondence, the index 2 sublattice of the even vectors of the lattice L is isomorphic to the orthogonal complement of the vector v.

=== Other vectors ===
There are similar but increasingly complicated descriptions of the vectors of norm –2n for n=3, 4, 5, ..., and the number of orbits of such vectors increases quite rapidly.
