= Hans-Volker Niemeier =

German mathematician

Hans-Volker Niemeier is a German mathematician who in 1973 classified the Niemeier lattices, the even positive definite unimodular lattices in 24 dimensions.
