= Coxeter–Todd lattice =

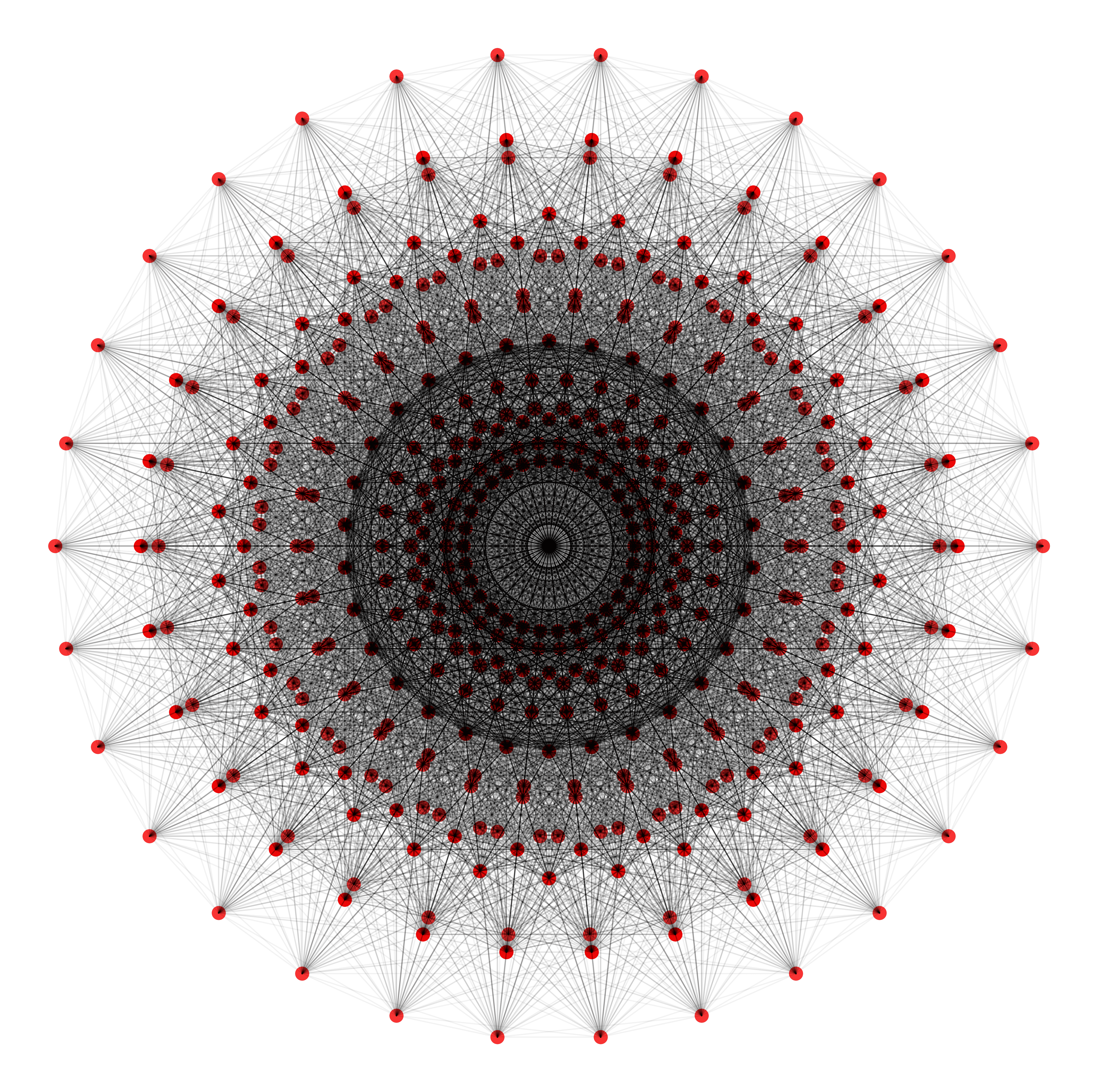
Orthogonal projection of the Coxeter–Todd lattice onto two dimensions

In mathematics, the Coxeter–Todd lattice K_{12}, discovered by Coxeter and Todd (1953), is a 12-dimensional even integral lattice of discriminant 3^{6} with no norm-2 vectors. It is the sublattice of the Leech lattice fixed by a certain automorphism of order 3, and is analogous to the Barnes–Wall lattice. The automorphism group of the Coxeter–Todd lattice has order 2^{10}·3^{7}·5·7 = 9!·4!·3^{2} = 78382080, and there are 756 vectors in this lattice of norm 4 (the shortest nonzero vectors in this lattice).

== Properties ==
The Coxeter–Todd lattice can be made into a 6-dimensional lattice self dual over the Eisenstein integers. The automorphism group of this complex lattice has index 2 in the full automorphism group of the Coxeter–Todd lattice and is a complex reflection group (number 34 on the list) with structure 6.PSU_{4}(F_{3}).2, called the Mitchell group.

The genus of the Coxeter–Todd lattice was described by (Scharlau & Venkov 1995) and has 10 isometry classes: all of them other than the Coxeter–Todd lattice have a root system of maximal rank 12.
