= Eric Stephen Barnes =

Australian mathematician (1924–2000)

Lieutenant Professor Eric Stephen Barnes BA PhD FAA

Acting Vice-Chancellor of the University of Adelaide
- In office 1975–1975
- Chancellor: John Jefferson Bray
- Preceded by: Sir Geoffrey Badger
- Succeeded by: Sir Geoffrey Badger

Personal details
- Born: 16 January 1924 Cardiff, Wales, UK
- Died: 16 October 2000 (aged 76) Adelaide, South Australia, Australia

LT Eric Stephen Barnes FAA (16 January 1924 – 16 October 2000) was a Welsh-born Australian pure mathematician, academic and cryptographer. He was awarded the Thomas Ranken Lyle Medal in 1959, and was (Sir Thomas) Elder Professor of Mathematics at the University of Adelaide. He was elected a Fellow of the Australian Academy of Science in 1954.

He was born in 1924 in Cardiff, Wales (part of the modern United Kingdom; as from 1922), and died in 2000 in Adelaide, South Australia. He was educated at the Universities of Sydney and Cambridge.

Barnes enlisted in the Citizen Military Forces, and – during World War II – was commissioned as a lieutenant under the auspices of the Australian Army. He served with distinction from 1943–1945, lending his talents as a number theorist to military cryptography efforts. Barnes made significant contributions to the work of decoding encrypted Japanese communications.

He held appointments as a Fellow of Trinity College, Cambridge (1950–54); assistant lecturer, Cambridge (1951–53); reader in pure mathematics, University of Sydney (1953–58); Elder Professor of Mathematics, University of Adelaide (UofA; 1959–74); Secretary (Physical Sciences), Australian Academy of Science (1972–76); Deputy Vice-chancellor, UofA (1975–80); Professor of Pure Mathematics, UofA (1981–83).

Arguably the highest-profile position of Barnes' civilian career was his role as UofA's Acting Vice-chancellor in 1975; temporarily backfilling Sir Geoffrey Badger.

== See also ==
- Barnes–Wall lattice
