= John Leech (mathematician) =

British mathematician

- Born: 21 July 1926; Weybridge, Surrey
- Died: 28 September 1992 (aged 66); Scotland
- Occupation: Mathematician
- Known for: Leech lattice

John Leech (21 July 1926 in Weybridge, Surrey – 28 September 1992 in Scotland) was a British mathematician working in number theory, geometry and combinatorial group theory. He is best known for his discovery of the Leech lattice in 1965. He also discovered Ta(3) in 1957. Leech was married to Jenifer Haselgrove, a British radio scientist.
