= E8 lattice =

Lattice in 8-dimensional space with special properties

In mathematics, the E_{8} lattice is a special lattice in R^{8}. It can be characterized as the unique positive-definite, even, unimodular lattice of rank 8. The name derives from the fact that it is the root lattice of the E_{8} root system.

The norm of the E_{8} lattice (divided by 2) is a positive definite even unimodular quadratic form in 8 variables, and conversely such a quadratic form can be used to construct a positive-definite, even, unimodular lattice of rank 8. The existence of such a form was first shown by H. J. S. Smith in 1867, and the first explicit construction of this quadratic form was given by Korkin and Zolotarev in 1873. The E_{8} lattice is also called the Gosset lattice after Thorold Gosset who was one of the first to study the geometry of the lattice itself around 1900.

== Lattice points ==
The E_{8} lattice is a discrete subgroup of R^{8} of full rank (i.e. it spans all of R^{8}). It can be given explicitly by the set of points Γ_{8} ⊂ R^{8} such that

- all the coordinates are integers or all the coordinates are half-integers (a mixture of integers and half-integers is not allowed), and
- the sum of the eight coordinates is an even integer.

In symbols,

$$\Gamma_8 = \left\{(x_i) \in \mathbb Z^8 \cup (\mathbb Z + \tfrac{1}{2})^8 : {\textstyle\sum_i} x_i \equiv 0\;(\mbox{mod }2)\right\}.$$

It is not hard to check that the sum of two lattice points is another lattice point, so that Γ_{8} is indeed a subgroup.

An alternative description of the E_{8} lattice which is sometimes convenient is the set of all points in Γ′_{8} ⊂ R^{8} such that

- all the coordinates are integers and the sum of the coordinates is even, or
- all the coordinates are half-integers and the sum of the coordinates is odd.

In symbols,

$$\Gamma_8' = \left\{(x_i) \in \mathbb Z^8 \cup (\mathbb Z + \tfrac{1}{2})^8 : {{\textstyle\sum_i} x_i} \equiv 2x_1 \equiv 2x_2 \equiv 2x_3 \equiv 2x_4 \equiv 2x_5 \equiv 2x_6 \equiv 2x_7 \equiv 2x_8\;(\mbox{mod }2)\right\}.$$

$$\Gamma_8' = \left\{(x_i) \in \mathbb Z^8 : {{\textstyle\sum_i} x_i} \equiv 0\;(\mbox{mod }2)\right\}
\cup \left\{(x_i) \in (\mathbb Z + \tfrac{1}{2})^8 : {{\textstyle\sum_i} x_i} \equiv 1\;(\mbox{mod }2)\right\}.$$

The lattices Γ_{8} and Γ′_{8} are isomorphic and one may pass from one to the other by changing the signs of any odd number of half-integer coordinates. The lattice Γ_{8} is sometimes called the even coordinate system for E_{8} while the lattice Γ′_{8} is called the odd coordinate system. Unless we specify otherwise we shall work in the even coordinate system.

== Properties ==
The E_{8} lattice Γ_{8} can be characterized as the unique lattice in R^{8} with the following properties:

- It is integral, meaning that all scalar products of lattice elements are integers.
- It is unimodular, meaning that it is integral, and can be generated by the columns of an 8×8 matrix with determinant ±1 (i.e. the volume of the fundamental parallelotope of the lattice is 1). Equivalently, Γ_{8} is self-dual, meaning it is equal to its dual lattice.
- It is even, meaning that the norm of any lattice vector is even.

Even unimodular lattices can occur only in dimensions divisible by 8. In dimension 16 there are two such lattices: Γ_{8} ⊕ Γ_{8} and Γ_{16} (constructed in an analogous fashion to Γ_{8}). In dimension 24 there are 24 such lattices, called Niemeier lattices. The most important of these is the Leech lattice.

One possible basis for Γ_{8} is given by the columns of the (upper triangular) matrix

$$\left[\begin{matrix}
2 & -1 & 0 & 0 & 0 & 0 & 0 & 1/2 \\
0 & 1 & -1 & 0 & 0 & 0 & 0 & 1/2 \\
0 & 0 & 1 & -1 & 0 & 0 & 0 & 1/2 \\
0 & 0 & 0 & 1 & -1 & 0 & 0 & 1/2 \\
0 & 0 & 0 & 0 & 1 & -1 & 0 & 1/2 \\
0 & 0 & 0 & 0 & 0 & 1 & -1 & 1/2 \\
0 & 0 & 0 & 0 & 0 & 0 & 1  & 1/2 \\
0 & 0 & 0 & 0 & 0 & 0 & 0  & 1/2
\end{matrix}\right]$$

Γ_{8} is then the integral span of these vectors. All other possible bases are obtained from this one by right multiplication by elements of GL(8,Z).

The shortest nonzero vectors in Γ_{8} have length equal to √2. There are 240 such vectors:

- All half-integer (can only be ±1/2):
  - All positive or all negative: 2
  - Four positive, four negative: (8*7*6*5)/(4*3*2*1)=70
  - Two of one, six of the other: 2*(8*7)/(2*1) = 56
- All integer (can only be 0, ±1):
  - Two ±1, six zeroes: 4*(8*7)/(2*1)=112

These form a root system of type E_{8}. The lattice Γ_{8} is equal to the E_{8} root lattice, meaning that it is given by the integral span of the 240 roots. Any choice of 8 simple roots gives a basis for Γ_{8}.

== Symmetry group ==
The automorphism group (or symmetry group) of a lattice in R^{n} is defined as the subgroup of the orthogonal group O(n) that preserves the lattice. The symmetry group of the E_{8} lattice is the Weyl/Coxeter group of type E_{8}. This is the group generated by reflections in the hyperplanes orthogonal to the 240 roots of the lattice. Its order is given by

$$|W(\mathrm{E}_8)| = 696729600 = 4!\cdot 6!\cdot 8!$$

The E_{8} Weyl group contains a subgroup of order 128·8! consisting of all permutations of the coordinates and all even sign changes. This subgroup is the Weyl group of type D_{8}. The full E_{8} Weyl group is generated by this subgroup and the block diagonal matrix H_{4}⊕H_{4} where H_{4} is the Hadamard matrix

$$H_4 = \tfrac{1}{2}\left[\begin{smallmatrix}
1 & 1 & 1 & 1\\
1 & -1 & 1 & -1\\
1 & 1 & -1 & -1\\
1 & -1 & -1 & 1\\
\end{smallmatrix}\right].$$

== Geometry ==
See 5_{21} honeycomb

The E_{8} lattice points are the vertices of the 5_{21} honeycomb, which is composed of regular 8-simplex and 8-orthoplex facets. This honeycomb was first studied by Gosset who called it a 9-ic semi-regular figure (Gosset regarded honeycombs in n dimensions as degenerate n+1 polytopes). In Coxeter's notation, Gosset's honeycomb is denoted by 5_{21} and has the Coxeter-Dynkin diagram:

This honeycomb is highly regular in the sense that its symmetry group (the affine ${\tilde{E}}_8$ Weyl group) acts transitively on the k-faces for k ≤ 6. All of the k-faces for k ≤ 7 are simplices.

The vertex figure of Gosset's honeycomb is the semiregular E_{8} polytope (4_{21} in Coxeter's notation) given by the convex hull of the 240 roots of the E_{8} lattice.

Each point of the E_{8} lattice is surrounded by 2160 8-orthoplexes and 17280 8-simplices. The 2160 deep holes near the origin are exactly the halves of the norm 4 lattice points. The 17520 norm 8 lattice points fall into two classes (two orbits under the action of the E_{8} automorphism group): 240 are twice the norm 2 lattice points while 17280 are 3 times the shallow holes surrounding the origin.

A hole in a lattice is a point in the ambient Euclidean space whose distance to the nearest lattice point is a local maximum. (In a lattice defined as a uniform honeycomb these points correspond to the centers of the facets volumes.) A deep hole is one whose distance to the lattice is a global maximum. There are two types of holes in the E_{8} lattice:

- Deep holes such as the point (1,0,0,0,0,0,0,0) are at a distance of 1 from the nearest lattice points. There are 16 lattice points at this distance which form the vertices of an 8-orthoplex centered at the hole (the Delaunay cell of the hole).
- Shallow holes such as the point $(\tfrac{5}{6}, \tfrac{1}{6}, \tfrac{1}{6}, \tfrac{1}{6}, \tfrac{1}{6}, \tfrac{1}{6}, \tfrac{1}{6}, \tfrac{1}{6})$ are at a distance of $\tfrac{2\sqrt 2}{3}$ from the nearest lattice points. There are 9 lattice points at this distance forming the vertices of an 8-simplex centered at the hole.

== Sphere packings and kissing numbers ==
The E_{8} lattice is remarkable in that it gives optimal solutions to the sphere packing problem and the kissing number problem in 8 dimensions.

The sphere packing problem asks what is the densest way to pack (solid) n-dimensional spheres of a fixed radius in R^{n} so that no two spheres overlap. Lattice packings are special types of sphere packings where the spheres are centered at the points of a lattice. Placing spheres of radius 1/√2 at the points of the E_{8} lattice gives a lattice packing in R^{8} with a density of

$$\frac{\pi^4}{2^4 4!} \cong 0.25367.$$

A 1935 paper of Hans Frederick Blichfeldt proved that this is the maximum density that can be achieved by a lattice packing in 8 dimensions. Furthermore, the E_{8} lattice is the unique lattice (up to isometries and rescalings) with this density. Maryna Viazovska proved in 2016 that this density is, in fact, optimal even among irregular packings.

The kissing number problem asks what is the maximum number of spheres of a fixed radius that can touch (or "kiss") a central sphere of the same radius. In the E_{8} lattice packing mentioned above any given sphere touches 240 neighboring spheres. This is because there are 240 lattice vectors of minimum nonzero norm (the roots of the E_{8} lattice). It was shown in 1979 that this is the maximum possible number in 8 dimensions.

The sphere packing problem and the kissing number problem are remarkably difficult and optimal solutions are only known in 1, 2, 3, 8, and 24 dimensions (plus dimension 4 for the kissing number problem). The fact that solutions are known in dimensions 8 and 24 follows in part from the special properties of the E_{8} lattice and its 24-dimensional cousin, the Leech lattice.

== Theta function ==
One can associate to any (positive-definite) lattice Λ a theta function given by

$$\Theta_\Lambda(\tau) = \sum_{x\in\Lambda}e^{i\pi\tau\|x\|^2}\qquad\mathrm{Im}\,\tau > 0.$$

The theta function of a lattice is then a holomorphic function on the upper half-plane. Furthermore, the theta function of an even unimodular lattice of rank n is actually a modular form of weight n/2. The theta function of an integral lattice is often written as a power series in $q = e^{i\pi\tau}$ so that the coefficient of q^{n} gives the number of lattice vectors of norm n.

Up to normalization, there is a unique modular form of weight 4 and level 1: the Eisenstein series G_{4}(τ). The theta function for the E_{8} lattice must then be proportional to G_{4}(τ). The normalization can be fixed by noting that there is a unique vector of norm 0. This gives

$$\Theta_{\Gamma_8}(\tau) = 1 + 240\sum_{n=1}^\infty \sigma_3(n) q^{2n}$$

where σ_{3}(n) is the divisor function. It follows that the number of E_{8} lattice vectors of norm 2n is 240 times the sum of the cubes of the divisors of n. The first few terms of this series are given by (sequence A004009 in the OEIS):

$$\Theta_{\Gamma_8}(\tau) = 1 + 240\,q^2 + 2160\,q^4 + 6720\,q^6 + 17520\,q^8 + 30240\, q^{10} + 60480\,q^{12} + O(q^{14}).$$

The E_{8} theta function may be written in terms of the Jacobi theta functions as follows:

$$\Theta_{\Gamma_8}(\tau) = \frac{1}{2}\left(\theta_2(q)^8 + \theta_3(q)^8 + \theta_4(q)^8\right)$$

where

$$\theta_2(q) = \sum_{n=-\infty}^{\infty}q^{(n+\frac{1}{2})^2}\qquad
\theta_3(q) = \sum_{n=-\infty}^{\infty}q^{n^2}\qquad
\theta_4(q) = \sum_{n=-\infty}^{\infty}(-1)^n q^{n^2}.$$

Note that the j-function can be expressed as,

$$j(\tau) \,=\, 32\,\frac{\left(\theta_2(q)^8+\theta_3(q)^8+\theta_4(q)^8\right)^3}{\left(\theta_2(q)\,\theta_3(q)\,\theta_4(q)\right)^8}$$

== Other constructions ==
=== Hamming code ===
The E_{8} lattice is very closely related to the (extended) Hamming code H(8,4) and can, in fact, be constructed from it. The Hamming code H(8,4) is a binary code of length 8 and rank 4; that is, it is a 4-dimensional subspace of the finite vector space (F_{2})^{8}. Writing elements of (F_{2})^{8} as 8-bit integers in hexadecimal, the code H(8,4) can by given explicitly as the set

{00, 0F, 33, 3C, 55, 5A, 66, 69, 96, 99, A5, AA, C3, CC, F0, FF}.

The code H(8,4) is significant partly because it is a Type II self-dual code. It has a minimum nonzero Hamming weight 4, meaning that any two codewords differ by at least 4 bits. It is the largest length 8 binary code with this property.

One can construct a lattice Λ from a binary code C of length n by taking the set of all vectors x in Z^{n} such that x is congruent (modulo 2) to a codeword of C. It is often convenient to rescale Λ by a factor of 1/√2,

$$\Lambda = \tfrac{1}{\sqrt 2}\left\{x \in \mathbb Z^n : x\,\bmod\,2 \in C\right\}.$$

Applying this construction a Type II self-dual code gives an even, unimodular lattice. In particular, applying it to the Hamming code H(8,4) gives an E_{8} lattice. It is not entirely trivial, however, to find an explicit isomorphism between this lattice and the lattice Γ_{8} defined above.

=== Tetracode ===
The E_{8} lattice can also be constructed as a four-dimensional lattice over the complex numbers using the tetracode T, a two-dimensional subspace of (F_{3})^{4} generated by the vectors (0,1,1,1) and (1,0,1,2).

The Eisenstein integers Z[ω] can be 3-colored according to whether a given point is congruent to 0, 1, or −1 modulo √−3. Then, similar to the above construction, the E_{8} lattice is given up to a scaling factor by

$$E_8 = \left\{x \in \mathbb{Z}[\omega]^4 : x\,\bmod\,\sqrt{-3} \in T\right\}.$$

=== Integral octonions ===
The E_{8} lattice is also closely related to the nonassociative algebra of real octonions O. It is possible to define the concept of an integral octonion analogous to that of an integral quaternion. The integral octonions naturally form a lattice inside O. This lattice is just a rescaled E_{8} lattice. (The minimum norm in the integral octonion lattice is 1 rather than 2.) Embedded in the octonions in this manner the E_{8} lattice takes on the structure of a nonassociative ring.

Fixing a basis (1, i, j, k, ℓ, ℓi, ℓj, ℓk) of unit octonions, one can define the integral octonions as a maximal order containing this basis. (One must, of course, extend the definitions of order and ring to include the nonassociative case.) This amounts to finding the largest subring of O containing the units on which the expressions x*x (the norm of x) and x + x* (twice the real part of x) are integer-valued. There are actually seven such maximal orders, one corresponding to each of the seven imaginary units. However, all seven maximal orders are isomorphic. One such maximal order is generated by the octonions i, j, and 1/2 (i + j + k + ℓ).

A detailed account of the integral octonions and their relation to the E_{8} lattice can be found in Conway and Smith (2003).

==== Example definition of integral octonions ====
Consider octonion multiplication defined by triads: 137, 267, 457, 125, 243, 416, 356. Then integral octonions form vectors:

1) $\pm e_i$, i=0, 1, ..., 7

2) $\pm e_0\pm e_a\pm e_b\pm e_c$, indexes abc run through the seven triads 124, 235, 346, 457, 561, 672, 713

3) $\pm e_p\pm e_q\pm e_r\pm e_s$, indexes pqrs run through the seven tetrads 3567, 1467, 1257, 1236, 2347, 1345, 2456.

Imaginary octonions in this set, namely 14 from 1) and 7*16=112 from 3), form the roots of the Lie algebra $E_7$. Along with the remaining 2+112 vectors we obtain 240 vectors that form roots of Lie algebra $E_8$.

== Applications ==
In 1982 Michael Freedman produced an example of a topological 4-manifold, called the E_{8} manifold, whose intersection form is given by the E_{8} lattice. This manifold is an example of a topological manifold which admits no smooth structure and is not even triangulable.

In string theory, the heterotic string is a peculiar hybrid of a 26-dimensional bosonic string and a 10-dimensional superstring. In order for the theory to work correctly, the 16 mismatched dimensions must be compactified on an even, unimodular lattice of rank 16. There are two such lattices: Γ_{8}>⊕Γ_{8} and Γ_{16} (constructed in a fashion analogous to that of Γ_{8}). These lead to two version of the heterotic string known as the E_{8}×E_{8} heterotic string and the SO(32) heterotic string.

== See also ==
- Leech lattice
- E_{8} (mathematics)
- Semiregular E-polytope
