= Geoffrey Badger =

Australian academic (1916–2002)

Instructor Lieutenant(UK) Professor Sir Geoffrey Badger AO FAA FRACI FTSE FACE FAIM

13th Vice-Chancellor of the University of Adelaide
- In office 1967–1977 Serving with Acting Vice-Chancellors; James Melville (Jul–Aug 1973; Jun–Aug 1974), Eric Stephen Barnes (Oct 1975)
- Chancellor: Sir Kenneth Wills; John Jefferson Bray
- Preceded by: Sir Henry Bolton Basten
- Succeeded by: Donald (Don) Stranks; Peter Helmut Glow (acting); Angas Hurst (acting)

Professor of Organic Chemistry, University of Adelaide
- In office 1955–1964

Personal details
- Born: Geoffrey Malcolm Badger; 10 October 1916 Port Augusta, South Australia
- Died: 23 September 2002 (aged 85) Adelaide, South Australia

Instr. Lt. Sir Geoffrey Malcolm Badger AO (10 October 1916, Port Augusta, South Australia – 23 September 2002, Adelaide) was Professor of Organic Chemistry at the University of Adelaide from 1955 to 1964, and Vice-Chancellor of the University from 1967 to 1977. He was elected Fellow of the Australian Academy of Science in 1960, appointed an Officer of the Order of Australia in 1975, and was knighted in 1979. In retirement he wrote two books, "Explorers of the Pacific" (1988) and "The Explorers of Australia" (2001).
