= Siegel identity =

One of two formulae that are used in the resolution of Diophantine equations

In mathematics, Siegel's identity refers to one of two formulae that are used in the resolution of Diophantine equations.

== Statement ==
The first formula is

$$\frac{x_3 - x_1}{x_2 - x_1} + \frac{x_2 - x_3}{x_2 - x_1} = 1 .$$

The second is

$$\frac{x_3 - x_1}{x_2 - x_1} \cdot\frac{t - x_2}{t - x_3} + \frac{x_2 - x_3}{x_2 - x_1} \cdot \frac{t - x_1}{t - x_3} = 1 .$$

== Application ==
The identities are used in translating Diophantine problems connected with integral points on hyperelliptic curves into S-unit equations.

== See also ==
- Siegel formula
