= Kissing number =

Geometric concept

Unsolved problem in mathematics
What is the maximum possible kissing number for n-dimensional spheres in (n + 1)-dimensional Euclidean space?
More unsolved problems in mathematics

In geometry, the kissing number of a mathematical space is defined as the greatest number of non-overlapping unit spheres (i.e., of radius 1) that can be arranged in that space such that they each touch a common unit sphere. For a given sphere packing (arrangement of spheres) in a given space, a kissing number can also be defined for each individual sphere as the number of spheres it touches. For a lattice packing, the kissing number is the same for every sphere; but for an arbitrary sphere packing, the kissing number may vary from one sphere to another.

Other names for kissing number that have been used are Newton number (after the originator of the problem), and contact number.

In general, the kissing number problem seeks the maximum possible kissing number for n-dimensional spheres in (n + 1)-dimensional Euclidean space. Ordinary spheres correspond to two-dimensional closed surfaces in three-dimensional space.

Finding the kissing number when centers of spheres are confined to a line (the one-dimensional case) or a plane (two-dimensional case) is trivial. Proving a solution to the three-dimensional case, despite being easy to conceptualise and model in the physical world, eluded mathematicians until the mid-20th century. Solutions in higher dimensions are considerably more challenging, and only a handful of cases have been solved exactly. For others, investigations have determined upper and lower bounds based on the sum of squares hierarchy of semidefinite programs, but not exact solutions.

== Known greatest kissing numbers ==
=== One dimension ===
In one dimension, the kissing number is 2:

=== Two dimensions ===
In two dimensions, the kissing number is 6:

Proof: Consider a circle with center C that is touched by circles with centers C_{1}, C_{2}, ... Consider the rays C̅C̅_{i}. These rays all emanate from the same center C, so the sum of angles between adjacent rays is 360°.

Assume by contradiction that there are more than six touching circles. Then at least two adjacent rays, say C̅C̅_{1} and C̅C̅_{2}, are separated by an angle of less than 60°. The segments C̅C̅_{i} have the same length – 2r – for all i. Therefore, the triangle △CC_{1}C_{2} is isosceles, and its third side – C̅_{1̅}C̅_{2̅} – has a side length of less than 2r. Therefore, the circles 1 and 2 intersect – a contradiction.

=== Three dimensions ===
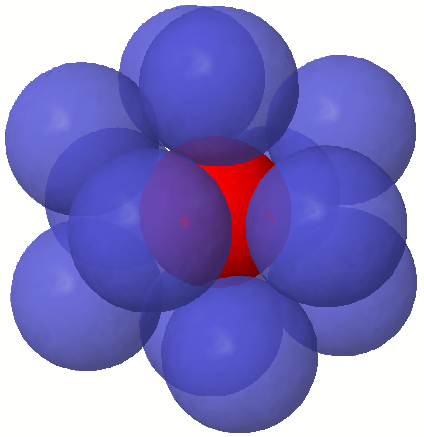
A highly symmetrical realization of the kissing number 12 in three dimensions is by aligning the centers of outer spheres with vertices of a regular icosahedron. This leaves slightly more than 10% of the radius between two nearby spheres.

In three dimensions, the kissing number is 12, but the correct value was much more difficult to establish than in dimensions one and two. It is easy to arrange 12 spheres so that each touches a central sphere, with a lot of space left over, and it is not obvious that there is no way to pack in a 13th sphere. (In fact, there is so much extra space that any two of the 12 outer spheres can exchange places through a continuous movement without any of the outer spheres losing contact with the center one.) This was the subject of a famous disagreement between mathematicians Isaac Newton and David Gregory. Newton correctly thought that the limit was 12; Gregory thought that a 13th could fit. Some incomplete proofs that Newton was correct were offered in the 19th century, most notably one by Reinhold Hoppe, but the first correct proof (according to Brass, Moser, and Pach) did not appear until 1953 by Schütte and van der Waerden.

The twelve neighbors of the central sphere correspond to the maximum bulk coordination number of an atom in a crystal lattice in which all atoms have the same size (as in a chemical element). A coordination number of 12 is found in a cubic close-packed or a hexagonal close-packed structure.

=== Larger dimensions ===
In four dimensions, the kissing number is 24. This was proven in 2003 by Oleg Musin. Previously, the answer was thought to be either 24 or 25: it is straightforward to produce a packing of 24 spheres around a central sphere (one can place the spheres at the vertices of a suitably scaled 24-cell centered at the origin), but, as in the three-dimensional case, there is a lot of space left over — even more, in fact, than for n = 3 — so the situation was even less clear.

The existence of the highly symmetrical E_{8} lattice and Leech lattice has allowed to determine the kissing number for n = 8 (namely, 240) and for n = 24 (namely, 196,560). The kissing number in n dimensions is unknown for other values of n.

If arrangements are restricted to lattice arrangements, in which the centres of the spheres all lie on points in a lattice, then this restricted kissing number is known for n = 1 to 9 and n = 24 dimensions. For 5, 6, and 7 dimensions, the arrangement with the highest known kissing number found so far is the optimal lattice arrangement, but the existence of a non-lattice arrangement with a higher kissing number has not been excluded.

== Some known bounds ==
The following table lists some known bounds on the kissing number in various dimensions. The dimensions in which the kissing number is known are listed in boldface.

Rough volume estimates show that kissing number in n dimensions grows exponentially in n. The base of exponential growth is not known. The gray area in the above plot represents the possible values between known upper and lower bounds. Circles represent values that are known exactly.

Dimension	Lower bound	Upper bound
**1**	2	
**2**	6	
**3**	12	
**4**	24	
5	40	44
6	72	77
7	126	134
**8**	240	
9	306	363
10	510	553
11	604	868
12	841	1,355
13	1,154	2,064
14	1,932	3,174
15	2,564	4,853
16	4,320	7,320
17	5,730	10,978
18	8,358	16,406
19	12,460	24,417
20	19,448	36,195
21	31,560	53,524
22	49,896	80,810
23	93,150	122,351
**24**	196,560	

== Generalization ==
The kissing number problem can be generalized to the problem of finding the maximum number of non-overlapping congruent copies of any convex body that touch a given copy of the body. There are different versions of the problem, depending on whether the copies are only required to be congruent to the original body, translates of the original body, or translated by a lattice. For example, for the regular tetrahedron, it is known that both the lattice kissing number and the translative kissing number are equal to 18, whereas the congruent kissing number is at least 56.

== Algorithms ==
There are several approximation algorithms on intersection graphs where the approximation ratio depends on the kissing number. For example, there is a polynomial-time 10-approximation algorithm to find a maximum non-intersecting subset of a set of rotated unit squares.

The construction of kissing configurations can be formulated as a discrete Gram-matrix completion problem with prescribed inner products. Given a dimension $n$ and a finite set of allowed inner products $\mathcal C\subseteq[-1,1/2]$, the objective is to maximize the order $N$ of a real symmetric matrix $G$ satisfying $G\succeq0$, $G_{ii}=1$, $\operatorname{rank}(G)\le n$, and $G_{ij}\in\mathcal C$ for $i\ne j$. Matrices are extended by adding rows and columns subject to these constraints, with each feasible matrix establishing $K(n)\ge N$. The formulation provides a general framework for the kissing number problem, allowing different algorithms to be developed and refined within the same formulation.

== Mathematical statement ==
The kissing number problem can be stated as the existence of a solution to a set of inequalities. Let x_{n} be a set of N D-dimensional position vectors of sphere centres. The condition that this set of spheres can lie round the central sphere without overlapping is:

$$\exist x\ \left\{ \forall_n \{x_n^\textsf{T} x_n = 1\} \land \forall_{m,n: m \neq n} \{ (x_n - x_m)^\textsf{T}(x_n - x_m) \geq 1\} \right\}.$$

Thus the problem for each dimension can be expressed in the existential theory of the reals. However, general methods of solving problems in this form take at least exponential time; that is why this problem has only been solved up to four dimensions. By using additional variables y_{nm}, this can be converted to a single quartic equation in $N(N-1)/2 + DN$ variables:

$$\exist xy\ \left\{ \sum_n \left(x_n^\textsf{T} x_n - 1\right)^2 + \sum_{m,n: m<n}\Big( (x_n - x_m)^\textsf{T} (x_n - x_m) - 1 - (y_{nm})^2 \Big)^2 = 0 \right\}.$$

Therefore, to solve the case in D = 5 dimensions and N = 40 + 1 vectors would be equivalent to determining the existence of real solutions to a quartic polynomial in 1025 variables. For the D = 24 dimensions and N = 196560 + 1, the quartic would have 19,322,732,544 variables. An alternative statement in terms of distance geometry is given by the squared distances R_{mn} between the m-th and n-th sphere centers:

$$\exist R\ \{ \forall_n \{R_{0n} = 1 \} \land \forall_{m,n: m<n} \{ R_{mn} \geq 1\} \}.$$

This must be supplemented with the condition that the Cayley–Menger determinant is zero for any set of points which forms a (D + 1)-simplex in D dimensions, since that volume must be zero. Setting $R_{mn} = 1 + y_{mn}^2$ gives a set of simultaneous polynomial equations in just y which must be solved for real values only. The two methods, being entirely equivalent, have various different uses. For example, in the second case, one can randomly alter the values of the y by small amounts to try to minimise the polynomial in terms of the y.

== See also ==
- Equilateral dimension
- Spherical code
- Soddy's hexlet
- Cylinder sphere packing
