= Mitchell's group =

In mathematics, Mitchell's group is a complex reflection group in 6 complex dimensions of order 108 × 9!, introduced by Mitchell (1914). It has the structure 6.PSU_{4}(F_{3}).2. As a complex reflection group it has 126 reflections of order 2, and its ring of invariants is a polynomial algebra with generators of degrees 6, 12, 18, 24, 30, 42. Coxeter gives it group symbol [1 2 3]^{3} and Coxeter-Dynkin diagram.

Mitchell's group is an index 2 subgroup of the automorphism group of the Coxeter–Todd lattice.
