= Howard Hawks Mitchell =

American mathematician (1885 - 1943)

Howard Hawks Mitchell (January 13, 1885, Marietta, Ohio – 1943) was an American mathematician who worked on group theory and number theory and who introduced Mitchell's group.

In 1910 he received a PhD from Princeton University as Oswald Veblen's first doctoral student. During the academic year 1910/1911 Mitchell was an instructor at Yale University. At the University of Pennsylvania he was an instructor from 1911 to 1914 and then a professor until his death in 1943 at age 58 from coronary thrombosis.

Mitchell was elected to the American Philosophical Society in 1925. His doctoral students include Leonard Carlitz.

== Selected works ==
- Mitchell, Howard H. (1913). "Determination of the finite quaternary linear groups" (PDF). Trans. Amer. Math. Soc. 14 (1): 123–142. doi:10.1090/s0002-9947-1913-1500941-8.
- Mitchell, Howard H. (1913). "On some systems of collineation groups". Bull. Amer. Math. Soc. 20 (3): 134–138. doi:10.1090/s0002-9904-1913-02447-9.
