= Henry John Stephen Smith =

British mathematician (1826–1883)

Henry John Stephen Smith FRS FRSE FRAS
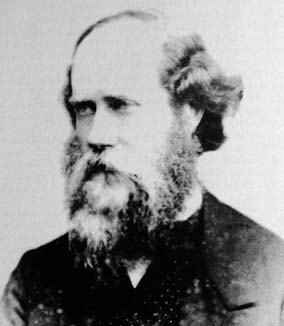
- Born: 2 November 1826; Dublin, Ireland
- Died: 9 February 1883 (aged 56); Oxford, England
- Resting place: St Sepulchre's Cemetery, Oxford
- Education: Balliol College, Oxford
- Known for: Smith–Minkowski–Siegel mass formula Smith normal form Smith–Volterra–Cantor set
- Scientific career
- Fields: Mathematics
- Workplaces: University of Oxford
- Academic advisors: Henry Highton
- Notable students: J. Cook Wilson

Henry John Stephen Smith (2 November 1826 – 9 February 1883) was an Irish mathematician and amateur astronomer remembered for his work in elementary divisors, quadratic forms, and Smith–Minkowski–Siegel mass formula in number theory. In matrix theory he is visible today in having his name on the Smith normal form of a matrix. Smith was also first to discover the Cantor set.

== Life ==
Smith was born in Dublin, Ireland, the fourth child of John Smith (1792–1828), a barrister, who died when Henry was two. His mother, Mary Murphy (d. 1857) from Bantry Bay, very soon afterwards moved the family to England. He had thirteen siblings, including Eleanor Smith, who became a prominent educational activist. He lived in several places in England as a boy. His mother did not send him to school but educated him herself until age 11, at which point she hired private tutors. At age 15 Smith was admitted in 1841 to Rugby School in Warwickshire, where Thomas Arnold was the school's headmaster. This came about because his tutor Henry Highton took up a housemaster position there.

At 19 he won an entrance scholarship to Balliol College, Oxford. He graduated in 1849 with high honours in both mathematics and classics. Smith was fluent in French having spent holidays in France, and he took classes in mathematics at the University of Paris during the 1846–7 academic year. He was unmarried and lived with his mother until her death in 1857. He then brought his sister, Eleanor Smith, to live with him as housekeeper at St Giles.

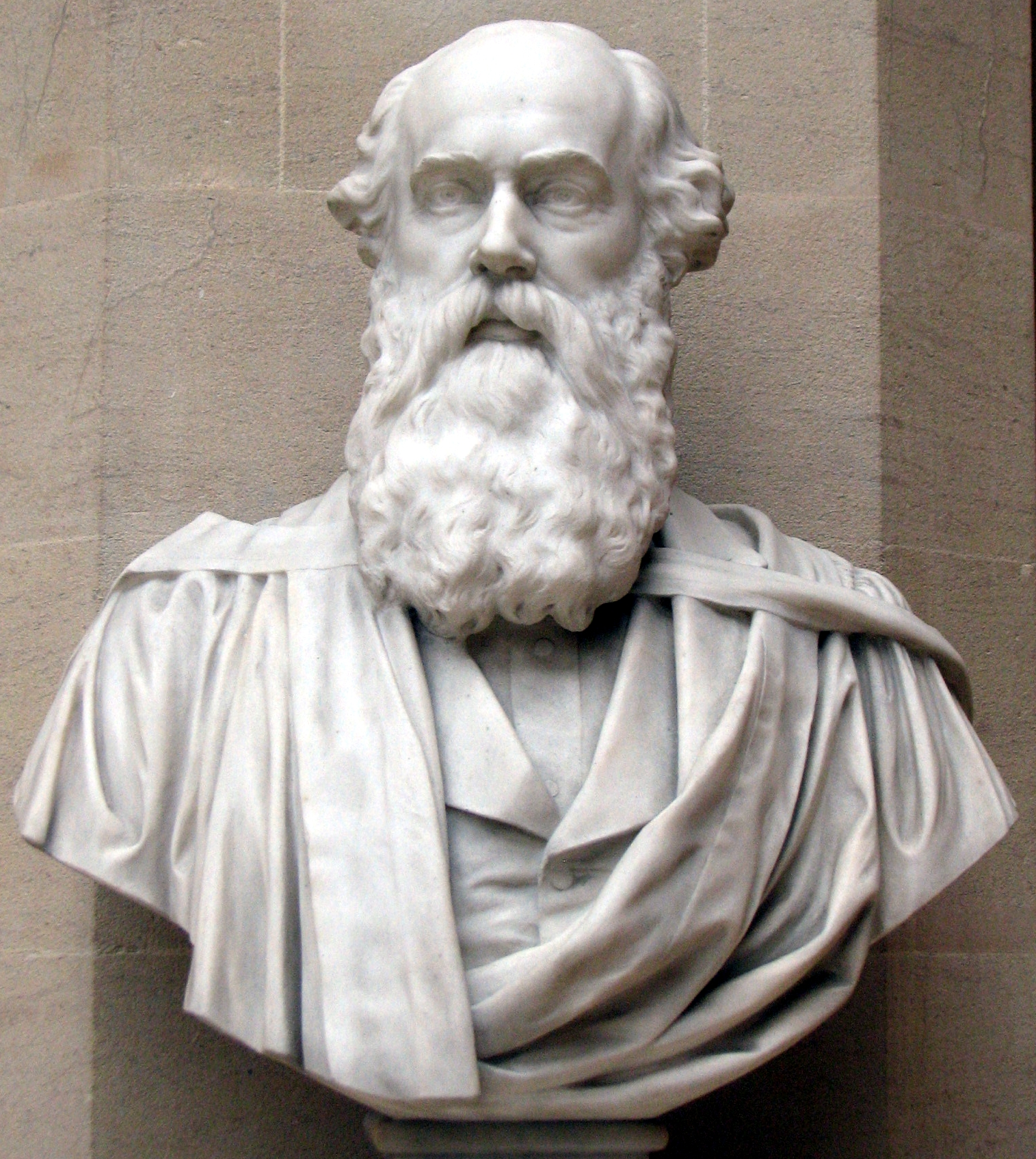
Bust on display in the Oxford University Museum.

Smith remained at Balliol College as a mathematics tutor following his graduation in 1849 and was soon promoted to Fellow status.

In 1861, he was promoted to the Savilian Chair of Geometry at the University of Oxford. In 1873, he was made the beneficiary of a fellowship at Corpus Christi College, Oxford, and gave up teaching at Balliol.

In 1874 he became Keeper of the Oxford University Museum and moved (with his sister) to the Keeper's House on South Parks Road in Oxford. On account of his ability as a man of affairs, Smith was in demand for academic administrative and committee work: he was a Mathematical Examiner for the University of London; a member of a Royal Commission to review scientific education practice; a member of the commission to reform University of Oxford governance; chairman of the committee of scientists overseeing the Meteorological Office; twice president of the London Mathematical Society; etc.

He died in Oxford on 9 February 1883. He is buried in St Sepulchre's Cemetery in Oxford.

== Work ==
=== Researches in number theory ===
An overview of Smith's mathematics contained in a lengthy obituary published in a professional journal in 1884 is reproduced at NumberTheory.Org. The following is an extract from it.

Smith's two earliest mathematical papers were on geometrical subjects, but the third concerned the theory of numbers. Following the example of Gauss, he wrote his first paper on the theory of numbers in Latin: "De compositione numerorum primorum formæ $4n+1$ ex duobus quadratis." In it he proves in an original manner the theorem of Fermat---"That every prime number of the form $4n+1$ ($n$ being an integer) is the sum of two square numbers." In his second paper he gives an introduction to the theory of numbers.

In 1858, Smith was selected by the British Association to prepare a report upon the Theory of Numbers. It was prepared in five parts, extending over the years 1859–1865. It is neither a history nor a treatise, but something intermediate. The author analyzes with remarkable clearness and order the works of mathematicians for the preceding century upon the theory of congruences, and upon that of binary quadratic forms. He returns to the original sources, indicates the principle and sketches the course of the demonstrations, and states the result, often adding something of his own.

During the preparation of the Report, and as a logical consequence of the researches connected therewith, Smith published several original contributions to the higher arithmetic. Some were in complete form and appeared in the Philosophical Transactions of the Royal Society of London; others were incomplete, giving only the results without the extended demonstrations, and appeared in the Proceedings of that Society. One of the latter, entitled "On the orders and genera of quadratic forms containing more than three indeterminates," enunciates certain general principles by means of which he solves a problem proposed by Eisenstein, namely, the decomposition of integer numbers into the sum of five squares; and further, the analogous problem for seven squares. It was also indicated that the four, six, and eight-square theorems of Jacobi, Eisenstein and Liouville were deducible from the principles set forth.

In 1868, Smith returned to the geometrical researches which had first occupied his attention. For a memoir on "Certain cubic and biquadratic problems" the Royal Academy of Sciences of Berlin awarded him the Steiner prize.

In February, 1882, Smith was surprised to see in the Comptes rendus that the subject proposed by the Paris Academy of Science for the Grand prix des sciences mathématiques was the theory of the decomposition of integer numbers into a sum of five squares; and that the attention of competitors was directed to the results announced without demonstration by Eisenstein, whereas nothing was said about his papers dealing with the same subject in the Proceedings of the Royal Society. He wrote to M. Hermite calling his attention to what he had published; in reply he was assured that the members of the commission did not know of the existence of his papers, and he was advised to complete his demonstrations and submit the memoir according to the rules of the competition. According to the rules each manuscript bears a motto, and the corresponding envelope containing the name of the successful author is opened. There were still three months before the closing of the concours (1 June 1882) and Smith set to work, prepared the memoir and despatched it in time.

Two months after Smith's death, the Paris Academy made their award. Two of the three memoirs sent in were judged worthy of the prize. When the envelopes were opened, the authors were found to be Smith and Minkowski, a young mathematician of Königsberg, Prussia. No notice was taken of Smith's previous publication on the subject, and M. Hermite on being written to, said that he forgot to bring the matter to the notice of the commission.

=== Work on the Riemann integral ===
In 1875 Smith published the important paper (Smith 1875) on the integrability of discontinuous functions in Riemann's sense. In this work, while giving a rigorous definition of the Riemann integral as well as explicit rigorous proofs of many of the results published by Riemann, he also gave an example of a meagre set which is not negligible in the sense of measure theory, since its measure is not zero: a function which is everywhere continuous except on this set is not Riemann integrable. Smith's example shows that the proof of sufficient condition for the Riemann integrability of a discontinuous function given earlier by Hermann Hankel was incorrect and the result does not hold: however, his result remained unnoticed until much later, having no influence on successive developments. In an 1875 paper, he discussed a nowhere-dense set of positive measure on the real line, an early version of the Cantor set, now known as the Smith–Volterra–Cantor set.

== Publications ==
- Smith, H. J. S. (1874). "Note on continued fractions". The Messenger of Mathematics. 6: 1–13.
- Smith, H. J. S. (1875), "On the integration of discontinuous functions", Proceedings of the London Mathematical Society, 6: 140–153, JFM 07.0247.01.
- Smith, Henry John Stephen (1965) [1894], Glaisher, J. W. L. (ed.), The Collected Mathematical Papers of Henry John Stephen Smith, vol. I, II, New York: AMS Chelsea Publishing, ISBN 978-0-8284-0187-6, volume 1volume 2

== See also ==
- Smith–Volterra–Cantor set
