= Niemeier lattice =

Positive-definite integral set of repeated points with Abelian group-rank 24

In mathematics, a Niemeier lattice is one of the 24 positive definite even unimodular lattices of rank 24, which were classified by Hans-Volker Niemeier (1973). Venkov (1978) gave a simplified proof of the classification. Witt (1941) mentions that he found more than 10 such lattices, but gives no further details. One example of a Niemeier lattice is the Leech lattice found in 1967.

== Classification ==
Niemeier lattices are usually labelled by the Dynkin diagram of their root lattice. Each Niemeier lattice can be constructed from its root lattice (except for the Leech lattice which has no roots) by adjoining elements known as glue vectors, as detailed in §16.1 of Conway & Sloane (1998). The Dynkin diagrams associated with a Niemeier lattice have rank either 0 or 24, and all of their components have the same Coxeter number. (The Coxeter number, at least in these cases, is the number of roots divided by the dimension.) There are exactly 24 Dynkin diagrams with these properties, and there turns out to be a unique Niemeier lattice for each of these Dynkin diagrams.

The complete list of Niemeier lattices is given in the following table. In the table,

G_{0} is the order of the group generated by reflections
G_{1} is the order of the group of automorphisms fixing all components of the Dynkin diagram
G_{2} is the order of the group of automorphisms of permutations of components of the Dynkin diagram
G_{∞} is the index of the root lattice in the Niemeier lattice, in other words, the order of the "glue code". It is the square root of the discriminant of the root lattice.
G_{0}×G_{1}×G_{2} is the order of the automorphism group of the lattice
G_{∞}×G_{1}×G_{2} is the order of the automorphism group of the corresponding deep hole within the Leech lattice.

Row	Lattice root system	Dynkin diagram	Coxeter number	G_{0}	G_{1}	G_{2}	G_{∞}
1	Leech lattice (no roots)		0	1	2Co_{1}	1	Z^{24}
2	A_{1}^{24}		2	2^{24}	1	M_{24}	2^{12}
3	A_{2}^{12}		3	3!^{12}	2	M_{12}	3^{6}
4	A_{3}^{8}		4	4!^{8}	2	1344	4^{4}
5	A_{4}^{6}		5	5!^{6}	2	120	5^{3}
6	A_{5}^{4}D_{4}		6	6!^{4}(2^{3}4!)	2	24	72
7	D_{4}^{6}		6	(2^{3}4!)^{6}	3	720	4^{3}
8	A_{6}^{4}		7	7!^{4}	2	12	7^{2}
9	A_{7}^{2}D_{5}^{2}		8	8!^{2}(2^{4}5!)^{2}	2	4	32
10	A_{8}^{3}		9	9!^{3}	2	6	27
11	A_{9}^{2}D_{6}		10	10!^{2}(2^{5}6!)	2	2	20
12	D_{6}^{4}		10	(2^{5}6!)^{4}	1	24	16
13	E_{6}^{4}		12	(2^{7}3^{4}5)^{4}	2	24	9
14	A_{11}D_{7}E_{6}		12	12!(2^{6}7!)(2^{7}3^{4}5)	2	1	12
15	A_{12}^{2}		13	13!^{2}	2	2	13
16	D_{8}^{3}		14	(2^{7}8!)^{3}	1	6	8
17	A_{15}D_{9}		16	16!(2^{8}9!)	2	1	8
18	A_{17}E_{7}		18	18!(2^{10}3^{4}5.7)	2	1	6
19	D_{10}E_{7}^{2}		18	(2^{9}10!)(2^{10}3^{4}5.7)^{2}	1	2	4
20	D_{12}^{2}		22	(2^{11}12!)^{2}	1	2	4
21	A_{24}		25	25!	2	1	5
22	D_{16}E_{8}		30	(2^{15}16!)(2^{14}3^{5}5^{2}7)	1	1	2
23	E_{8}^{3}		30	(2^{14}3^{5}5^{2}7)^{3}	1	6	1
24	D_{24}		46	2^{23}24!	1	1	2

== The neighborhood graph of the Niemeier lattices ==
If L is an odd unimodular lattice of dimension 8n and M its sublattice of even vectors, then M is contained in exactly 3 unimodular lattices, one of which is L and the other two of which are even. (If L has a norm 1 vector then the two even lattices are isomorphic.) The Kneser neighborhood graph in 8n dimensions has a point for each even lattice, and a line joining two points for each odd 8n dimensional lattice with no norm 1 vectors, where the vertices of each line are the two even lattices associated to the odd lattice. There may be several lines between the same pair of vertices, and there may be lines from a vertex to itself. Kneser proved that this graph is always connected. In 8 dimensions it has one point and no lines, in 16 dimensions it has two points joined by one line, and in 24 dimensions it is the following graph:

Each point represents one of the 24 Niemeier lattices, and the lines joining them represent the 24 dimensional odd unimodular lattices with no norm 1 vectors. The number on the left is the Coxeter number of the Niemeier lattice. The red index number in the node indicates the row of the associated table above.

In 32 dimensions the neighborhood graph has more than a billion vertices.

== Properties ==
Some of the Niemeier lattices are related to sporadic simple groups. The Leech lattice is acted on by a double cover of the Conway group, and the lattices A_{1}^{24} and A_{2}^{12} are acted on by the Mathieu groups M_{24} and M_{12}.

The Niemeier lattices, other than the Leech lattice, correspond to the deep holes of the Leech lattice. This implies that the affine Dynkin diagrams of the Niemeier lattices can be seen inside the Leech lattice, when two points of the Leech lattice are joined by no lines when they have distance $\sqrt 4$, by 1 line if they have distance $\sqrt 6$, and by a double line if they have distance $\sqrt 8$.

Niemeier lattices also correspond to the 24 orbits of primitive norm zero vectors w of the even unimodular Lorentzian lattice II_{25,1}, where the Niemeier lattice corresponding to w is w^{⊥}/w.

== See also ==
- Umbral moonshine
- Smith Minkowski Siegel mass formula#Dimension n = 24
