= Leech lattice =

24-dimensional repeating pattern of points

In mathematics, the Leech lattice is an even unimodular lattice Λ_{24} in 24-dimensional Euclidean space, E^{24}. It is one of the best models for the kissing number problem. It was discovered by John Leech (1967). It may also have been discovered (but not published) by Ernst Witt in 1940.

== Characterization ==
The Leech lattice Λ_{24} is the unique lattice in 24-dimensional Euclidean space, E^{24}, with the following list of properties:

- It is unimodular: it can be generated by the columns of a certain 24×24 matrix with determinant 1.
- It is even: the square of the length of each vector in Λ_{24} is an even integer.
- The length of every non-zero vector in Λ_{24} is at least 2.

The last condition is equivalent to the condition that unit balls centered at the points of Λ_{24} do not overlap. Each is tangent to 196,560 neighbors, and this is known to be the largest number of non-overlapping 24-dimensional unit balls that can simultaneously touch a single unit ball. This arrangement of 196,560 unit balls centred about another unit ball is so efficient that there is no room to move any of the balls; this configuration and its mirror image are the only 24-dimensional arrangements where 196,560 unit balls simultaneously touch another. This property is also true in 1, 2, and 8 dimensions, with 2, 6, and 240 unit balls, respectively, based on the integer lattice, hexagonal tiling, and E_{8} lattice, respectively.

It has no root system and in fact is the first unimodular lattice with no roots (vectors of norm less than 4), and therefore has a centre density of 1. By multiplying this value by the volume of a unit ball in 24 dimensions, $\tfrac{\pi^{12}}{12!}$, its absolute density can be derived.

Conway (1983) showed that the Leech lattice is isometric to the set of simple roots (or the Dynkin diagram) of the reflection group of the 26-dimensional even Lorentzian unimodular lattice II_{25,1}. By comparison, the Dynkin diagrams of II_{9,1} and II_{17,1} are finite.

== Applications ==
The binary Golay code, independently developed in 1949, is an application in coding theory. More specifically, it is an error-correcting code capable of correcting up to three errors in each 24-bit word, and detecting up to four. It was used to communicate with the Voyager probes, as it is much more compact than the previously used Hadamard code.

Quantizers, or analog-to-digital converters, can use lattices to minimise the average root-mean-square error. Most quantizers are based on the one-dimensional integer lattice, but using multi-dimensional lattices reduces the RMS error. The Leech lattice is a good solution to this problem, as the Voronoi cells have a low second moment.

The vertex algebra of the two-dimensional conformal field theory describing bosonic string theory, compactified on the 24-dimensional quotient torus R^{24}/Λ_{24} and orbifolded by a two-element reflection group, provides an explicit construction of the Griess algebra that has the monster group as its automorphism group. This monster vertex algebra was also used to prove the monstrous moonshine conjectures.

== Constructions ==
The Leech lattice can be constructed in a variety of ways. Like all lattices, it can be constructed by taking the integral span of the columns of its generator matrix, a 24×24 matrix with determinant 1.

Leech generator matrix

A 24×24 generator (in row convention) for the Leech Lattice is given by the following matrix divided by $\sqrt{8}$:

 8 0 0 0 0 0 0 0 0 0 0 0 0 0 0 0 0 0 0 0 0 0 0 0
 4 4 0 0 0 0 0 0 0 0 0 0 0 0 0 0 0 0 0 0 0 0 0 0
 4 0 4 0 0 0 0 0 0 0 0 0 0 0 0 0 0 0 0 0 0 0 0 0
 4 0 0 4 0 0 0 0 0 0 0 0 0 0 0 0 0 0 0 0 0 0 0 0
 4 0 0 0 4 0 0 0 0 0 0 0 0 0 0 0 0 0 0 0 0 0 0 0
 4 0 0 0 0 4 0 0 0 0 0 0 0 0 0 0 0 0 0 0 0 0 0 0
 4 0 0 0 0 0 4 0 0 0 0 0 0 0 0 0 0 0 0 0 0 0 0 0
 2 2 2 2 2 2 2 2 0 0 0 0 0 0 0 0 0 0 0 0 0 0 0 0
 4 0 0 0 0 0 0 0 4 0 0 0 0 0 0 0 0 0 0 0 0 0 0 0
 4 0 0 0 0 0 0 0 0 4 0 0 0 0 0 0 0 0 0 0 0 0 0 0
 4 0 0 0 0 0 0 0 0 0 4 0 0 0 0 0 0 0 0 0 0 0 0 0
 2 2 2 2 0 0 0 0 2 2 2 2 0 0 0 0 0 0 0 0 0 0 0 0
 4 0 0 0 0 0 0 0 0 0 0 0 4 0 0 0 0 0 0 0 0 0 0 0
 2 2 0 0 2 2 0 0 2 2 0 0 2 2 0 0 0 0 0 0 0 0 0 0
 2 0 2 0 2 0 2 0 2 0 2 0 2 0 2 0 0 0 0 0 0 0 0 0
 2 0 0 2 2 0 0 2 2 0 0 2 2 0 0 2 0 0 0 0 0 0 0 0
 4 0 0 0 0 0 0 0 0 0 0 0 0 0 0 0 4 0 0 0 0 0 0 0
 2 0 2 0 2 0 0 2 2 2 0 0 0 0 0 0 2 2 0 0 0 0 0 0
 2 0 0 2 2 2 0 0 2 0 2 0 0 0 0 0 2 0 2 0 0 0 0 0
 2 2 0 0 2 0 2 0 2 0 0 2 0 0 0 0 2 0 0 2 0 0 0 0
 0 2 2 2 2 0 0 0 2 0 0 0 2 0 0 0 2 0 0 0 2 0 0 0
 0 0 0 0 0 0 0 0 2 2 0 0 2 2 0 0 2 2 0 0 2 2 0 0
 0 0 0 0 0 0 0 0 2 0 2 0 2 0 2 0 2 0 2 0 2 0 2 0
−3 1 1 1 1 1 1 1 1 1 1 1 1 1 1 1 1 1 1 1 1 1 1 1

=== Using the binary Golay code ===
The Leech lattice can be explicitly constructed as the set of vectors of the form 2^{−3/2}(a_{1}, a_{2}, ..., a_{24}), where the a_{i} are integers such that

$$a_1+a_2+\cdots+a_{24}\equiv 4a_1\equiv 4a_2\equiv\cdots\equiv4a_{24}\pmod 8$$

and for each fixed residue class modulo 4, the 24 bit word, whose 1s correspond to the coordinates i such that a_{i} belongs to this residue class, is a word in the binary Golay code. The Golay code, together with the related Witt design, features in a construction for the 196560 minimal vectors in the Leech lattice.

The Leech lattice (L mod 8) can be directly constructed by combinations of the 3 following sets:

$L = (4B + C)\otimes{1_{2^{12}}} + 1_{2^{24}} \otimes 2G,$

where 1_{n} is a ones vector of size n, G is the 24-bit Golay code, B is the sequence of 24-bit integers, and C is the Thue-Morse sequence or integer bit parity sum (that give the chirality of the lattice).

24-bit Golay  [2^12 codes]   24-bit integer[2^24 codes]   Parity   Leech Lattice [2^36 codes]
G =                          B =                          C =      L = (4B + C) ⊕ 2G
00000000 00000000 00000000   00000000 00000000 00000000   0        00000000 00000000 00000000
11111111 00000000 00000000   10000000 00000000 00000000   1        22222222 00000000 00000000
11110000 11110000 00000000   01000000 00000000 00000000   1        22220000 22220000 00000000
00001111 11110000 00000000   11000000 00000000 00000000   0        ...
11001100 11001100 00000000   00100000 00000000 00000000   1        51111111 11111111 11111111
00110011 11001100 00000000   10100000 00000000 00000000   0        73333333 11111111 11111111
00111100 00111100 00000000   01100000 00000000 00000000   0        ...
11000011 00111100 00000000   11100000 00000000 00000000   1        15111111 11111111 11111111
10101010 10101010 00000000   00010000 00000000 00000000   1        37333333 11111111 11111111
01010101 10101010 00000000   10010000 00000000 00000000   0        ...
01011010 01011010 00000000   01010000 00000000 00000000   0        44000000 00000000 00000000
10100101 01011010 00000000   11010000 00000000 00000000   1        66222222 00000000 00000000
...                          ...                          ...      ...
11111111 11111111 11111111   11111111 11111111 11111111   0        66666666 66666666 66666666

=== Using the Lorentzian lattice II_{25,1} ===
The Leech lattice can also be constructed as $w^\perp/w$, where $w$ is the Weyl vector

$$(0,1,2,3,\dots,22,23,24; 70)$$

in the 26-dimensional even Lorentzian unimodular lattice II_{25,1}. The existence of such an integral vector of Lorentzian norm zero relies on the fact that 1^{2} + 2^{2} + ... + 24^{2} is a perfect square (in fact 70^{2}); the number 24 is the only integer bigger than 1 with this property (see cannonball problem). This was conjectured by Édouard Lucas, but the proof came much later, based on elliptic functions.

The vector $(0,1,2,3,\dots,22,23,24)$ in this construction is really the Weyl vector of the even sublattice D_{24} of the odd unimodular lattice I^{25}. More generally, if L is any positive definite unimodular lattice of dimension 25 with at least 4 vectors of norm 1, then the Weyl vector of its norm 2 roots has integral length, and there is a similar construction of the Leech lattice using L and this Weyl vector.

=== Based on other lattices ===
Conway & Sloane (1982) described another 23 constructions for the Leech lattice, each based on a Niemeier lattice. It can also be constructed by using three copies of the E_{8} lattice, in the same way that the binary Golay code can be constructed using three copies of the extended Hamming code, H_{8}. This construction is known as the Turyn construction of the Leech lattice.

=== As a laminated lattice ===
Starting with a single point, Λ_{0}, stack copies of the lattice Λ_{n} can be stacked to form an (n + 1)-dimensional lattice, Λ_{n+1}, without reducing the minimal distance between points. Λ_{1} corresponds to the integer lattice, Λ_{2} is to the hexagonal lattice, and Λ_{3} is the face-centered cubic packing. Conway & Sloane (1982b) showed that the Leech lattice is the unique laminated lattice in 24 dimensions.

=== As a complex lattice ===
The Leech lattice is also a 12-dimensional lattice over the Eisenstein integers. This is known as the complex Leech lattice, and is isomorphic to the 24-dimensional real Leech lattice. In the complex construction of the Leech lattice, the binary Golay code is replaced with the ternary Golay code, and the Mathieu group M_{24} is replaced with the Mathieu group M_{12}. The E_{6} lattice, E_{8} lattice, and Coxeter–Todd lattice also have constructions as complex lattices, over either the Eisenstein or Gaussian integers.

=== Using the icosian ring ===
The Leech lattice can also be constructed using the ring of icosians. The icosian ring is abstractly isomorphic to the E_{8} lattice, three copies of which can be used to construct the Leech lattice using the Turyn construction.

=== Witt's construction ===
In 1972 Witt gave the following construction, which he said he found in 1940, on January 28. Suppose that H is an n × n Hadamard matrix, where n = 4ab. Then the matrix
$$\begin{pmatrix} Ia&H/2\\H/2&Ib\end{pmatrix}$$
defines a bilinear form in 2n dimensions, whose kernel has n dimensions. The quotient by this kernel is a nonsingular bilinear form taking values in (1/2)Z. It has 3 sublattices of index 2 that are integral bilinear forms. Witt obtained the Leech lattice as one of these three sublattices by taking a = 2, b = 3, and taking H to be the 24 × 24 matrix (indexed by Z/23Z ∪ ∞) with entries Χ(m+n) where Χ(∞)=1, Χ(0)=−1, and Χ(n)=is the quadratic residue symbol mod 23 for nonzero n. This matrix H is a Paley matrix with some insignificant sign changes.

=== Using a Paley matrix ===
Chapman (2001) described a construction using a skew Hadamard matrix of Paley type. The Niemeier lattice with root system $D_{24}$ can be made into a module for the ring of integers of the field $\mathbb{Q}(\sqrt{-23})$. Multiplying this Niemeier lattice by a non-principal ideal of the ring of integers gives the Leech lattice.

=== Using higher power residue codes ===
Raji (2005) constructed the Leech lattice using higher power residue codes over the ring $Z_4$. A similar construction is used to construct some of the other lattices of rank 24.

=== Using octonions ===
If L is the set of octonions with coordinates on the $E_8$ lattice, then the Leech lattice is the set of triplets $(x,y,z)$ such that

$$x,y,z \in L$$

$$x+y+z \in Ls$$

$$x+y,\ y+z,\ x+z \in L\bar{s}$$

where $s= \frac 1 2 (-e_1 + e_2 + e_3 + e_4 + e_5 + e_6 + e_7)$. This construction is due to (Wilson 2009).

== Symmetries ==
The Leech lattice's automorphism group is the Conway group Co_{0}, which is of order 8315553613086720000. The center of Co_{0} has two elements, and the quotient of Co_{0} by this center is the Conway group Co_{1}, a finite simple group, and one of the sporadic groups. Many other sporadic groups, such as the remaining Conway groups and Mathieu groups, can be constructed as the stabilizers of various configurations of vectors in the Leech lattice.

The automorphism group was first described by John Conway. The 398034000 vectors of norm 8 fall into 8292375 "crosses" of 48 vectors. Each cross contains 24 mutually orthogonal vectors and their negatives, and thus describe the vertices of a 24-dimensional orthoplex. Each of these crosses can be taken to be the coordinate system of the lattice, and has the same symmetry of the Golay code, namely 2^{12} × |M_{24}|. Hence the full automorphism group of the Leech lattice has order 8292375 × 4096 × 244823040, or 8315553613086720000.

The Leech lattice and, by extension, the Leech polytope still possess a lower symmetry order than the 24-dimensional regular simplex, which is of order

(24+1)! = 25! = 15511210043330985984000000,

which is 1865325 times higher, and the 24-dimensional hypercube, which has order

24! × 2^{24} = 10409396852733332453861621760000,

or 1251798417408 times higher. Additionally, despite having such a high rotational symmetry group, the Leech lattice does not possess any hyperplanes of reflection symmetry. In other words, the Leech lattice is chiral. Likewise, Leech lattice has a lower symmetry than the Cartesian product of three copies of the E_{8} lattice.

== Geometry ==
Conway, Parker & Sloane (1982) showed that the covering radius of the Leech lattice is $\sqrt 2$; in other words, if a closed ball of this radius is placed around each lattice point, then these just cover Euclidean space. The points at distance at least $\sqrt 2$ from all lattice points are called the deep holes of the Leech lattice. There are 23 orbits of them under the automorphism group of the Leech lattice, and these orbits correspond to the 23 Niemeier lattices other than the Leech lattice: the set of vertices of the deep holes is isometric to the affine Dynkin diagram of the corresponding Niemeier lattice.

The Leech lattice has a density of $\tfrac{\pi^{12}}{12!}\approx 0.001930$. Cohn & Kumar (2009) showed that it gives the densest lattice packing of balls in 24-dimensional space. Maryna Viazovska, Henry Cohn, and Abhinav Kumar et al. (2017) improved this by showing that it is the densest sphere packing, even among non-lattice packings.

The 196560 minimal vectors are of three different varieties, known as shapes:

- $1104 = \binom {24}{2} \cdot 2^2$ vectors of shape (4^{2},0^{22}), for all permutations and sign choices;
- $97152 = 759 \cdot 2^8 \cdot \frac {1}{2}$ vectors of shape (2^{8},0^{16}), where the '2's correspond to an octad in the Golay code, and there are any even number of minus signs;
- $98304 = 2^{12} \cdot 24$ vectors of shape (∓3,±1^{23}), where the lower sign is used for the 1s of any codeword of the Golay code, and the ∓3 can appear in any position.

The ternary Golay code, binary Golay code, and Leech lattice give very efficient 24-dimensional spherical codes of 729, 4096, and 196560 points, respectively. Spherical codes are higher-dimensional analogues of Tammes problem, which arose as an attempt to explain the distribution of pores on pollen grains. These are distributed as to maximise the minimal angle between them. In two dimensions, the problem is trivial, but in three dimensions and higher it is not. An example of a spherical code in three dimensions is the set of the 12 vertices of the regular icosahedron.

== Theta series ==
One can associate to any (positive-definite) lattice Λ a theta function given by

$$\Theta_\Lambda(\tau) = \sum_{x\in\Lambda} e^{i\pi\tau\|x\|^2} \qquad \operatorname{Im} \tau > 0.$$

The theta function of a lattice is then a holomorphic function on the upper half-plane. Furthermore, the theta function of an even unimodular lattice of rank n is actually a modular form of weight n/2 for the full modular group PSL(2,Z). The theta function of an integral lattice is often written as a power series in $q = e^{2i\pi\tau}$ so that the coefficient of q^{n} gives the number of lattice vectors of squared norm 2n. In the Leech lattice, there are 196560 vectors of squared norm 4, 16773120 vectors of squared norm 6, 398034000 vectors of squared norm 8, and so on. The theta series of the Leech lattice is

$$\begin{align}
\Theta_{\Lambda_{24}}(\tau) & = E_{12}(\tau)-\frac{65520}{691} \Delta(\tau) \\[5pt]
& = 1 + \sum_{m=1}^\infty \frac{65520}{691} \left(\sigma_{11} (m) - \tau (m) \right) q^m \\[5pt]
& = 1 + 196560q^2 + 16773120q^3 + 398034000q^4 + \cdots,
\end{align}$$

where $E_{12}(\tau)$ is the normalized Eisenstein series of weight 12, $\Delta(\tau)$ is the modular discriminant, $\sigma_{11}(n)$ is the divisor function for exponent 11, and $\tau(n)$ is the Ramanujan tau function. It follows that for m ≥ 1, the number of vectors of squared norm 2m is

$$\frac{65520}{691} \left(\sigma_{11} (m) - \tau (m) \right).$$

== History ==
Many of the cross-sections of the Leech lattice, including the Coxeter–Todd lattice and Barnes–Wall lattice, in 12 and 16 dimensions, were found much earlier than the Leech lattice. O'Connor & Pall (1944) discovered a related odd unimodular lattice in 24 dimensions, now called the odd Leech lattice, one of whose two even neighbors is the Leech lattice. The Leech lattice was discovered in 1965 by John Leech (1967, 2.31, p. 262), by improving some earlier sphere packings he found (Leech 1964).

Conway (1968) calculated the order of the automorphism group of the Leech lattice, and, working with John G. Thompson, discovered three new sporadic groups as a by-product: the Conway groups, Co_{1}, Co_{2}, Co_{3}. They also showed that four other (then) recently announced sporadic groups, namely, Higman-Sims, Suzuki, McLaughlin, and the Janko group J_{2}, could be found inside the Conway groups using the geometry of the Leech lattice. (Ronan, p. 155)

Bei dem Versuch, eine Form aus einer solchen Klasse wirklich anzugeben, fand ich mehr als 10 verschiedene Klassen in Γ_{24}

— Witt (1941, p. 324)

Witt (1941, p. 324), has a single rather cryptic sentence mentioning that he found more than 10 even unimodular lattices in 24 dimensions without giving further details. Witt (1998, p. 328–329) stated that he found 9 of these lattices earlier in 1938, and found two more, the Niemeier lattice with A^{24}_{1} root system and the Leech lattice (and also the odd Leech lattice), in 1940.

== See also ==
- Sphere packing
- E_{8} lattice
- Conway group – Four finite groups derived from the Leech lattice
