= Unimodular lattice =

Integral lattice of determinant 1 or –1

In geometry and mathematical group theory, a unimodular lattice is an integral lattice of determinant 1 or −1. For a lattice in n-dimensional Euclidean space, this is equivalent to requiring that the volume of any fundamental domain for the lattice be 1.

The E_{8} lattice and the Leech lattice are two famous examples.

== Definitions ==
- A lattice is a free abelian group of finite rank with a symmetric bilinear form (·, ·).
- The lattice is integral if (·,·) takes integer values.
- The dimension of a lattice is the same as its rank (as a Z-module).
- The norm of a lattice element a is (a, a).
- A lattice is positive definite if the norm of all nonzero elements is positive.
- The determinant of a lattice is the determinant of the Gram matrix, a matrix with entries (a_{i}, a_{j}), where the elements a_{i} form a basis for the lattice.
- An integral lattice is unimodular if its determinant is 1 or −1.
- A unimodular lattice is even or type II if all norms are even, otherwise odd or type I.
- The minimum of a positive definite lattice is the lowest nonzero norm.
- Lattices are often embedded in a real vector space with a symmetric bilinear form. The lattice is positive definite, Lorentzian, and so on if its vector space is.
- The signature of a lattice is the signature of the form on the vector space.

== Examples ==
The three most important examples of unimodular lattices are:

- The lattice Z (the set of all integers), in one dimension.
- The E_{8} lattice, an even 8-dimensional lattice.
- The Leech lattice, the 24-dimensional even unimodular lattice with no roots.

== Properties ==
An integral lattice is unimodular if and only if its dual lattice is integral. Unimodular lattices are equal to their dual lattices, and for this reason, unimodular lattices are also known as self-dual.

Given a pair (m,n) of nonnegative integers, an even unimodular lattice of signature (m,n) exists if and only if m−n is divisible by 8, but an odd unimodular lattice of signature (m,n) always exists. In particular, even unimodular definite lattices only exist in dimension divisible by 8. Examples in all admissible signatures are given by the II_{m,n} and I_{m,n} constructions, respectively.

The theta function of a unimodular positive definite lattice is a modular form whose weight is one half the rank. If the lattice is even, the form has level 1, and if the lattice is odd the form has Γ_{0}(4) structure (i.e., it is a modular form of level 4). Due to the dimension bound on spaces of modular forms, the minimum norm of a nonzero vector of an even unimodular lattice is no greater than ⎣n/24⎦ + 1. An even unimodular lattice that achieves this bound is called extremal. Extremal even unimodular lattices are known in relevant dimensions up to 80, and their non-existence has been proven for dimensions above 163,264.

== Classification ==
For indefinite lattices, the classification is easy to describe. Write R^{m,n} for the m + n dimensional vector space R^{m+n} with the inner product of (a_{1}, ..., a_{m+n}) and (b_{1}, ..., b_{m+n}) given by

$$a_1 b_1 + \cdots + a_m b_m - a_{m+1} b_{m+1} - \cdots - a_{m+n} b_{m+n}. \,$$

In R^{m,n} there is one odd indefinite unimodular lattice up to isomorphism, denoted by

I_{m,n},

which is given by all vectors (a_{1},...,a_{m+n}) in R^{m,n} with all the a_{i} integers.

There are no indefinite even unimodular lattices unless

m − n is divisible by 8,

in which case there is a unique example up to isomorphism, denoted by

II_{m,n}.

This is given by all vectors (a_{1},...,a_{m+n}) in R^{m,n} such that either all the a_{i} are integers or they are all integers plus 1/2, and their sum is even. The lattice II_{8,0} is the same as the E_{8} lattice.

Positive definite unimodular lattices have been classified up to dimension 25. There is a unique example I_{n,0} in each dimension n less than 8, and two examples (I_{8,0} and II_{8,0}) in dimension 8. The number of lattices increases moderately up to dimension 25 (where there are 665 of them), but beyond dimension 25 the Smith-Minkowski-Siegel mass formula implies that the number increases very rapidly with the dimension; for example, there are more than 80,000,000,000,000,000 in dimension 32.

In some sense unimodular lattices up to dimension 9 are controlled by E_{8}, and up to dimension 25 they are controlled by the Leech lattice, and this accounts for their unusually good behavior in these dimensions. For example, the Dynkin diagram of the norm-2 vectors of unimodular lattices in dimension up to 25 can be naturally identified with a configuration of vectors in the Leech lattice. The wild increase in numbers beyond 25 dimensions might be attributed to the fact that these lattices are no longer controlled by the Leech lattice.

Even positive definite unimodular lattice exist only in dimensions divisible by 8. There is one in dimension 8 (the E_{8} lattice), two in dimension 16 (E_{8}^{2} and II_{16,0}), and 24 in dimension 24, called the Niemeier lattices (examples: the Leech lattice, II_{24,0}, II_{16,0} + II_{8,0}, II_{8,0}^{3}). Beyond 24 dimensions the number increases very rapidly; in 32 dimensions there are more than a billion of them.

Unimodular lattices with no roots (vectors of norm 1 or 2) have been classified up to dimension 29. There are none of dimension less than 23 (other than the zero lattice!). There is one in dimension 23 (called the short Leech lattice), two in dimension 24 (the Leech lattice and the odd Leech lattice), and Bacher & Venkov (2001) showed that there are 0, 1, 3, 38 in dimensions 25, 26, 27, 28, respectively. Beyond this the number increases very rapidly; there are 10092 in dimension 29 (Allombert & Chenevier 2025). In sufficiently high dimensions most unimodular lattices have no roots.

The only non-zero example of even positive definite unimodular lattices with no roots in dimension less than 32 is the Leech lattice in dimension 24. In dimension 32 there are more than ten million examples, and above dimension 32 the number increases very rapidly.

The following table from (King 2003) gives the numbers of (or lower bounds for) even or odd unimodular lattices in various dimensions, and shows the very rapid growth starting shortly after dimension 24.

Dimension	Odd lattices	Odd lattices no roots	Even lattices	Even lattices no roots
0	0	0	1	1
1	1	0		
2	1	0		
3	1	0		
4	1	0		
5	1	0		
6	1	0		
7	1	0		
8	1	0	1 (E_{8} lattice)	0
9	2	0		
10	2	0		
11	2	0		
12	3	0		
13	3	0		
14	4	0		
15	5	0		
16	6	0	2 (E_{8}^{2}, D_{16}^{+})	0
17	9	0		
18	13	0		
19	16	0		
20	28	0		
21	40	0		
22	68	0		
23	117	1 (shorter Leech lattice)		
24	273	1 (odd Leech lattice)	24 (Niemeier lattices)	1 (Leech lattice)
25	665	0		
26	2566 (Chenevier 2025)	1		
27	17059 (Chenevier 2025)	3		
28	374062 (Allombert & Chenevier 2025)	38		
29	≥ 37938009	10092 (Allombert & Chenevier 2025)		
30	≥ 20169641025	≥ 82000000		
31	≥ 5×10^{12}	≥ 8×10^{11}		
32	≥ 8×10^{16}	≥ 1×10^{16}	≥ 1162109024	≥ 10000000

Beyond 32 dimensions, the numbers increase even more rapidly.

== Applications ==
The second cohomology group of a closed simply connected oriented topological 4-manifold is a unimodular lattice. Michael Freedman showed that this lattice almost determines the manifold: there is a unique such manifold for each even unimodular lattice, and exactly two for each odd unimodular lattice. In particular if we take the lattice to be 0, this implies the Poincaré conjecture for 4-dimensional topological manifolds. Donaldson's theorem states that if the manifold is smooth and the lattice is positive definite, then it must be a sum of copies of Z, so most of these manifolds have no smooth structure. One such example is the $E_8$ manifold.
