= Bers =

Bers may refer to

- Lipman Bers, Latvian-American mathematician, or to various mathematical concepts named after Bers:
  - Bers area inequality
  - Bers compactification
  - Bers density conjecture
  - Bers slice
- Victor Bers, American classicist and son of the Latvian-American mathematician
- Bers (Wales), or Y Bers, the Welsh name of the town of Bersham
- Basse Bers and Haute Bers, villages in the Rimbach-près-Masevaux commune of northeastern France
- BERS (software), an Australian computer program for House Energy Rating
- Father Bers, a German writer who traced the origin of the Prayer to Saint Michael
- Bers, the piece corresponding to the chess queen in the Mongolian board game Hiashatar
- Bers., an abbreviation for the Italian Army rank of Bersagliere
- Bers, another word for jujubes, the fruit of the Ziziphus mauritiana tree
