= Linda Keen =

American mathematician

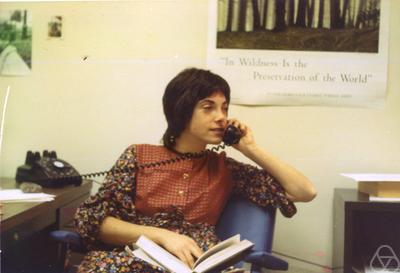
Linda Keen

Linda Jo Goldway Keen (born August 9, 1940, in New York City, New York) is an American mathematician and a fellow of the American Mathematical Society. Since 1965, she has been a professor in the Department of Mathematics and Computer Science at Lehman College of the City University of New York and a Professor of Mathematics at Graduate Center of the City University of New York.

== Professional career ==
As a high school student she attended the Bronx High School of Science. She received her Bachelor of Science degree from the City College of New York, then studied at the Courant Institute of Mathematical Sciences, earning her Doctor of Philosophy in mathematics in 1964. She wrote her thesis on Riemann surfaces under the direction of Lipman Bers at New York University.

Keen has worked at the Institute for Advanced Study, Hunter College, University of California at Berkeley, Columbia University, Boston University, Princeton University, and the Massachusetts Institute of Technology, as well as at various mathematical institutes in Europe and South America. After her initial appointment in 1965, in 1974 Keen was promoted to Full Professor at Lehman College and the CUNY Graduate Center. She served as Executive Officer of the Mathematics Program at the Graduate Center before retiring in 2017.

Keen served as president of the Association for Women in Mathematics during 1985-1986 and as vice-president of the American Mathematical Society during 1992-1995. She served on the board of trustees of the American Mathematical Society from 1999-2009 and as Associate Treasurer from 2009-2011. Keen worked with the mathematicians Paul Blanchard, Robert L. Devaney, Jane Gilman, Lisa Goldberg, Yunping Jiang, Nikola Lakic and Caroline Series among many others.

In 1975, Keen presented an AMS invited address and in 1989 she presented an MAA joint invited address. In 1993 she was selected as a Noether Lecturer by the Association for Women in Mathematics.

== Contributions ==
In addition to studying Riemann surfaces, Keen has worked in hyperbolic geometry, Kleinian groups and Fuchsian groups, complex analysis, and hyperbolic dynamics. In the field of hyperbolic geometry, she is known for the Collar lemma.

== Personal ==
She is married to Jonathan Brezin and resides in New York.

== Awards and honors ==
In 2012 she became a fellow of the American Mathematical Society.

In 2017, she was selected as a fellow of the Association for Women in Mathematics in the inaugural class.

== Books ==
- Hyperbolic Geometry from a Local Viewpoint (with Nikola Lakic, London Mathematical Society Student Texts 68, Cambridge University Press, 2007)
- The Legacy of Sonya Kovalevskaya (edited, Contemporary Mathematics 64, American Mathematical Society, 1987)
- Chaos and Fractals: The Mathematics Behind the Computer Graphics (edited with Robert L. Devaney, Proc. Symposia in Appl. Math, 39, American Mathematical Society, 1989)
- Lipa's Legacy: Proceedings of the 1st Bers Colloquium (edited with Józef Dodziuk, Contemporary Mathematics 211, American Mathematical Society, 1997)
- Complex dynamics. Twenty-five years after the appearance of the Mandelbrot set (edited with Robert L. Devaney, Contemporary Mathematics 396, American Mathematical Society, 2006)
- Lipman Bers, a Life in Mathematics (edited with Irwin Kra and Rubí E. Rodríguez, American Mathematical Society, 2015)
