= Riley slice =

In the mathematical theory of Kleinian groups, the Riley slice of Schottky space is a family of Kleinian groups generated by two parabolic elements. It was studied in detail by Keen & Series (1994) and named after Robert Riley by them. Some subtle errors in their paper were corrected by Komori & Series (1998).

== Definition ==
The Riley slice consists of the complex numbers ρ such that the two matrices

$$\begin{pmatrix}1&1\\0&1\\ \end{pmatrix}, \begin{pmatrix}1&0\\ \rho&1\\ \end{pmatrix}$$

generate a Kleinian group G with regular set Ω such that Ω/G is a 4-times punctured sphere.

The Riley slice is the quotient of the Teichmuller space of a 4-times punctured sphere by a group generated by Dehn twists around a curve, and so is topologically an annulus.

== See also ==
- Bers slice
