= Quasicircle =

Quasiconformal complex image of a circle

In mathematics, a quasicircle is a Jordan curve in the complex plane that is the image of a circle under a quasiconformal mapping of the plane onto itself. Originally introduced independently by Pfluger (1961) and Tienari (1962), in the older literature (in German) they were referred to as quasiconformal curves, a terminology which also applied to arcs. In complex analysis and geometric function theory, quasicircles play a fundamental role in the description of the universal Teichmüller space, through quasisymmetric homeomorphisms of the circle. Quasicircles also play an important role in complex dynamical systems.

== Definitions ==
A quasicircle is defined as the image of a circle under a quasiconformal mapping of the extended complex plane. It is called a K-quasicircle if the quasiconformal mapping has dilatation K. The definition of quasicircle generalizes the characterization of a Jordan curve as the image of a circle under a homeomorphism of the plane. In particular a quasicircle is a Jordan curve. The interior of a quasicircle is called a quasidisk.

As shown in Lehto & Virtanen (1973), where the older term "quasiconformal curve" is used, if a Jordan curve is the image of a circle under a quasiconformal map in a neighbourhood of the curve, then it is also the image of a circle under a quasiconformal mapping of the extended plane and thus a quasicircle. The same is true for "quasiconformal arcs" which can be defined as quasiconformal images of a circular arc either in an open set or equivalently in the extended plane.

== Geometric characterizations ==
Ahlfors (1963) gave a geometric characterization of quasicircles as those Jordan curves for which the absolute value of the cross-ratio of any four points, taken in cyclic order, is bounded below by a positive constant.

Ahlfors also proved that quasicircles can be characterized in terms of a reverse triangle inequality for three points: there should be a constant C such that if two points z_{1} and z_{2} are chosen on the curve and z_{3} lies on the shorter of the resulting arcs, then

$$|z_1-z_3| + |z_2-z_3| \le C |z_1-z_2|.$$

This property is also called bounded turning or the arc condition.

For Jordan curves in the extended plane passing through ∞, Ahlfors (1966) gave a simpler necessary and sufficient condition to be a quasicircle. There is a constant C > 0 such that if z_{1}, z_{2} are any points on the curve and z_{3} lies on the segment between them, then

$$\displaystyle{\left|z_3 -{z_1+z_2\over 2}\right|\le C |z_1-z_2|.}$$

These metric characterizations imply that an arc or closed curve is quasiconformal whenever it arises as the image of an interval or the circle under a bi-Lipschitz map f, i.e. satisfying

$$C_1|s-t|\le |f(s)-f(t)| \le C_2 |s-t|$$

for positive constants C_{i}.

== Quasicircles and quasisymmetric homeomorphisms ==
If φ is a quasisymmetric homeomorphism of the circle, then there are conformal maps f of [z| < 1 and g of |z|>1 into disjoint regions such that the complement of the images of f and g is a Jordan curve. The maps f and g extend continuously to the circle |z| = 1 and the sewing equation

$$\varphi= g^{-1}\circ f$$

holds. The image of the circle is a quasicircle.

Conversely, using the Riemann mapping theorem, the conformal maps f and g uniformizing the outside of a quasicircle give rise to a quasisymmetric homeomorphism through the above equation.

The quotient space of the group of quasisymmetric homeomorphisms by the subgroup of Möbius transformations provides a model of universal Teichmüller space. The above correspondence shows that the space of quasicircles can also be taken as a model.

== Quasiconformal reflection ==
A quasiconformal reflection in a Jordan curve is an orientation-reversing quasiconformal map of period 2 which switches the inside and the outside of the curve fixing points on the curve. Since the map

$$\displaystyle{R_0(z) = {1\over \overline{z}}}$$

provides such a reflection for the unit circle, any quasicircle admits a quasiconformal reflection. Ahlfors (1963) proved that this property characterizes quasicircles.

Ahlfors noted that this result can be applied to uniformly bounded holomorphic univalent functions f(z) on the unit disk D. Let Ω = f(D). As Carathéodory had proved using his theory of prime ends, f extends continuously to the unit circle if and only if ∂Ω is locally connected, i.e. admits a covering by finitely many compact connected sets of arbitrarily small diameter. The extension to the circle is 1-1 if and only if ∂Ω has no cut points, i.e. points which when removed from ∂Ω yield a disconnected set. Carathéodory's theorem shows that a locally set without cut points is just a Jordan curve and that in precisely this case is the extension of f to the closed unit disk a homeomorphism. If f extends to a quasiconformal mapping of the extended complex plane then ∂Ω is by definition a quasicircle. Conversely Ahlfors (1963) observed that if ∂Ω is a quasicircle and R_{1} denotes the quasiconformal reflection in ∂Ω then the assignment

$$\displaystyle{f(z)=R_1f R_0(z)}$$

for |z| > 1 defines a quasiconformal extension of f to the extended complex plane.

== Complex dynamical systems ==
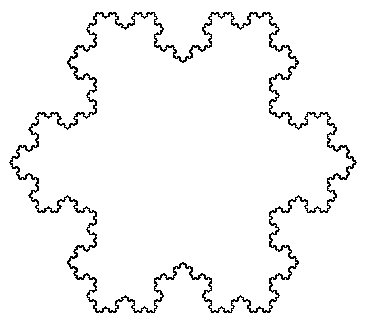
Koch snowflake

Quasicircles were known to arise as the Julia sets of rational maps R(z). Sullivan (1985) proved that if the Fatou set of R has two components and the action of R on the Julia set is "hyperbolic", i.e. there are constants c > 0 and A > 1 such that

$$|\partial_z R^n(z)| \ge c A^n$$

on the Julia set, then the Julia set is a quasicircle.

There are many examples:

- quadratic polynomials R(z) = z^{2} + c with an attracting fixed point
- the Douady rabbit (c = –0.122561 + 0.744862i, where c^{3} + 2 c^{2} + c + 1 = 0)
- quadratic polynomials z^{2} + λz with |λ| < 1
- the Koch snowflake

== Quasi-Fuchsian groups ==
Quasi-Fuchsian groups are obtained as quasiconformal deformations of Fuchsian groups. By definition their limit sets are quasicircles.

Let Γ be a Fuchsian group of the first kind: a discrete subgroup of the Möbius group preserving the unit circle. acting properly discontinuously on the unit disk D and with limit set the unit circle.

Let μ(z) be a measurable function on D with

$$\|\mu\|_\infty < 1$$

such that μ is Γ-invariant, i.e.

$$\mu(g(z)){\overline{\partial_{z}g(z)}\over \partial_z g(z)}=\mu(z)$$

for every g in Γ. (μ is thus a "Beltrami differential" on the Riemann surface D / Γ.)

Extend μ to a function on C by setting μ(z) = 0 off D.

The Beltrami equation

$$\partial_{\overline{z}} f (z) =\mu(z)\partial_zf(z)$$

admits a solution unique up to composition with a Möbius transformation.

It is a quasiconformal homeomorphism of the extended complex plane.

If g is an element of Γ, then f(g(z)) gives another solution of the Beltrami equation, so that

$$\alpha(g)=f\circ g \circ f^{-1}$$

is a Möbius transformation.

The group α(Γ) is a quasi-Fuchsian group with limit set the quasicircle given by the image of the unit circle under f.

== Hausdorff dimension ==
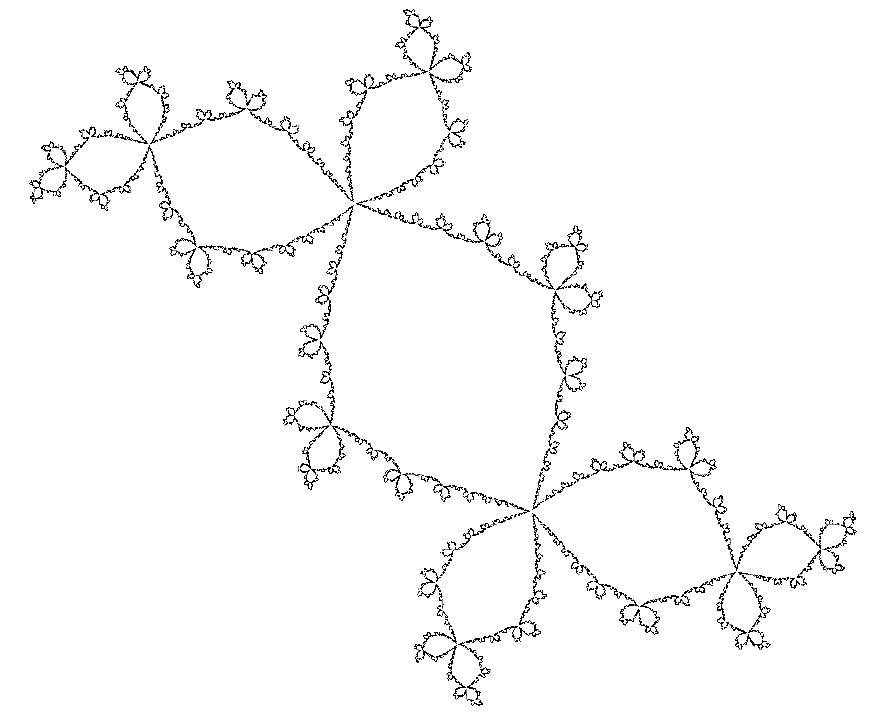
The Douady rabbit is composed of quasicircles with Hausdorff dimension approximately 1.3934

It is known that there are quasicircles for which no segment has finite length. The Hausdorff dimension of quasicircles was first investigated by Gehring & Väisälä (1973), who proved that it can take all values in the interval [1,2). Astala (1993), using the new technique of "holomorphic motions" was able to estimate the change in the Hausdorff dimension of any planar set under a quasiconformal map with dilatation K. For quasicircles C, there was a crude estimate for the Hausdorff dimension

$$d_H(C) \le 1 + k$$

where

$$k={K-1\over K+1}.$$

On the other hand, the Hausdorff dimension for the Julia sets J_{c} of the iterates of the rational maps

$$R(z) =z^2 +c$$

had been estimated as result of the work of Rufus Bowen and David Ruelle, who showed that

$$1 <  d_H(J_c) < 1 + {|c|^2 \over4\log 2} + o(|c|^2).$$

Since these are quasicircles corresponding to a dilatation

$$K=\sqrt{1+t\over 1-t}$$

where

$$t= |1-\sqrt{1-4c}|,$$

this led Becker & Pommerenke (1987) to show that for k small

$$1+ 0.36 k^2\le d_H(C) \le 1 + 37 k^2.$$

Having improved the lower bound following calculations for the Koch snowflake with Steffen Rohde and Oded Schramm, Astala (1994) conjectured that

$$d_H(C) \le 1 + k^2.$$

This conjecture was proved by Smirnov (2010); a complete account of his proof, prior to publication, was already given in Astala, Iwaniec & Martin (2009).

For a quasi-Fuchsian group Bowen (1979) and Sullivan (1982) showed that the Hausdorff dimension d of the limit set is always greater than 1. When d < 2, the quantity

$$\lambda=d(2-d)\,\in (0,1)$$

is the lowest eigenvalue of the Laplacian of the corresponding hyperbolic 3-manifold.
