= Double limit theorem =

On when a sequence of quasi-Fuchsian groups have a convergent subsequence

In hyperbolic geometry, Thurston's double limit theorem gives condition for a sequence of quasi-Fuchsian groups to have a convergent subsequence. It was introduced in Thurston (1998, theorem 4.1) and is a major step in Thurston's proof of the hyperbolization theorem for the case of manifolds that fiber over the circle.

== Statement ==
By Bers's theorem, quasi-Fuchsian groups (of some fixed genus) are parameterized by points in T×T, where T is Teichmüller space of the same genus. Suppose that there is a sequence of quasi-Fuchsian groups corresponding to points (g_{i}, h_{i}) in T×T. Also suppose that the sequences g_{i}, h_{i} converge to points μ,μ′ in the Thurston boundary of Teichmüller space of projective measured laminations. If the points μ,μ′ have the property that any nonzero measured lamination has positive intersection number with at least one of them, then the sequence of quasi-Fuchsian groups has a subsequence that converges algebraically.
