= Uniformization theorem =

Simply connected Riemann surface is equivalent to an open disk, complex plane, or sphere

In mathematics, the uniformization theorem states that every simply connected Riemann surface is conformally equivalent to one of three Riemann surfaces: the open unit disk, the complex plane, or the Riemann sphere. The theorem is a generalization of the Riemann mapping theorem from simply connected open subsets of the plane to arbitrary simply connected Riemann surfaces.

Since every Riemann surface has a universal cover which is a simply connected Riemann surface, the uniformization theorem leads to a classification of Riemann surfaces into three types: those that have the Riemann sphere as universal cover ("elliptic"), those with the plane as universal cover ("parabolic") and those with the unit disk as universal cover ("hyperbolic"). It further follows that every Riemann surface admits a Riemannian metric of constant curvature, where the curvature can be taken to be 1 in the elliptic, 0 in the parabolic and -1 in the hyperbolic case.

The uniformization theorem also yields a similar classification of closed orientable Riemannian 2-manifolds into elliptic/parabolic/hyperbolic cases. Each such manifold has a conformally equivalent Riemannian metric with constant curvature, where the curvature can be taken to be 1 in the elliptic, 0 in the parabolic and -1 in the hyperbolic case.

== History ==
Felix Klein (1883) and Henri Poincaré (1882) conjectured the uniformization theorem for (the Riemann surfaces of) algebraic curves. Henri Poincaré (1883) extended this to arbitrary multivalued analytic functions and gave informal arguments in its favor. The first rigorous proofs of the general uniformization theorem were given by Poincaré (1907) and Paul Koebe (1907a, 1907b, 1907c). Paul Koebe later gave several more proofs and generalizations. The history is described in Gray (1994); a complete account of uniformization up to the 1907 papers of Koebe and Poincaré is given with detailed proofs in de Saint-Gervais (2016) (the Bourbaki-type pseudonym of the group of fifteen mathematicians who jointly produced this publication).

== Classification of connected Riemann surfaces ==
Every Riemann surface is the quotient of the free, proper and holomorphic action of a discrete group on its universal covering and this universal covering, being a simply connected Riemann surface, is holomorphically isomorphic (one also says: "conformally equivalent" or "biholomorphic") to one of the following:

1. the Riemann sphere
2. the complex plane
3. the unit disk in the complex plane.

For compact Riemann surfaces, those with universal cover the unit disk are precisely the hyperbolic surfaces of genus greater than 1, all with non-abelian fundamental group; those with universal cover the complex plane are the Riemann surfaces of genus 1, namely the complex tori or elliptic curves with fundamental group Z^{2}; and those with universal cover the Riemann sphere are those of genus zero, namely the Riemann sphere itself, with trivial fundamental group.

== Classification of closed oriented Riemannian 2-manifolds ==
On an oriented 2-manifold, a Riemannian metric induces a complex structure using the passage to isothermal coordinates. If the Riemannian metric is given locally as

$$ds^2 = E \, dx^2 + 2F \, dx \, dy + G \, dy^2,$$

then in the complex coordinate z = x + iy, it takes the form

$$ds^2 = \lambda|dz +\mu \, d\overline{z}|^2,$$

where

$$\lambda = \frac14 \left( E + G + 2\sqrt{EG - F^2} \right),\ \
\mu = \frac1{4\lambda} (E - G + 2iF),$$

so that λ and μ are smooth with λ > 0 and |μ| < 1. In isothermal coordinates (u, v) the metric should take the form

$$ds^2 = \rho (du^2 + dv^2)$$

with ρ > 0 smooth. The complex coordinate w = u + i v satisfies

$$\rho \, |dw|^2 = \rho |w_z|^2 \left| dz + {w_{\overline{z}}\over w_z} \, d\overline{z}\right|^2,$$

so that the coordinates (u, v) will be isothermal locally provided the Beltrami equation

$${\partial w\over \partial \overline{z}} = \mu {\partial w\over \partial z}$$

has a locally diffeomorphic solution, i.e. a solution with non-vanishing Jacobian.

These conditions can be phrased equivalently in terms of the exterior derivative and the Hodge star operator ∗. u and v will be isothermal coordinates if ∗du = dv, where ∗ is defined on differentials by ∗(p dx + q dy) = −q dx + p dy. Let ∆ = ∗d∗d be the Laplace–Beltrami operator. By standard elliptic theory, u can be chosen to be harmonic near a given point, i.e. Δ u = 0, with du non-vanishing. By the Poincaré lemma dv = ∗du has a local solution v exactly when d(∗du) = 0. This condition is equivalent to Δ u = 0, so can always be solved locally. Since du is non-zero and the square of the Hodge star operator is −1 on 1-forms, du and dv must be linearly independent, so that u and v give local isothermal coordinates.

The existence of isothermal coordinates can be proved by other methods, for example using the general theory of the Beltrami equation, as in Ahlfors (2006), or by direct elementary methods, as in Chern (1955) and Jost (2006).

From this correspondence with compact Riemann surfaces, a classification of closed orientable Riemannian 2-manifolds follows. Each such is conformally equivalent to a unique closed 2-manifold of constant curvature, so a quotient of one of the following by a free action of a discrete subgroup of an isometry group:

1. the sphere (curvature +1)
2. the Euclidean plane (curvature 0)
3. the hyperbolic plane (curvature −1).
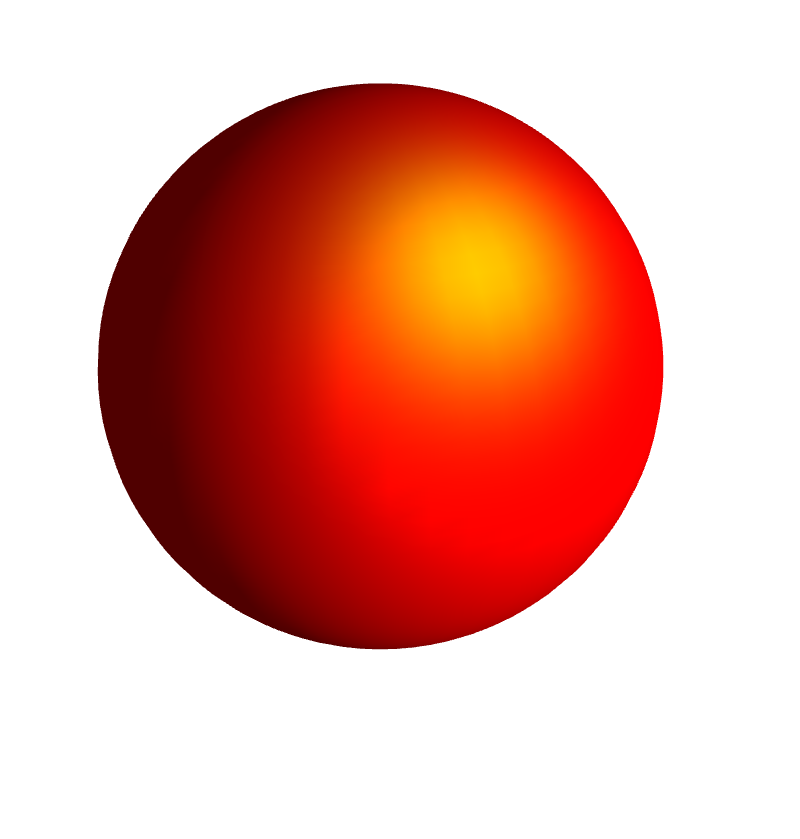
genus 0

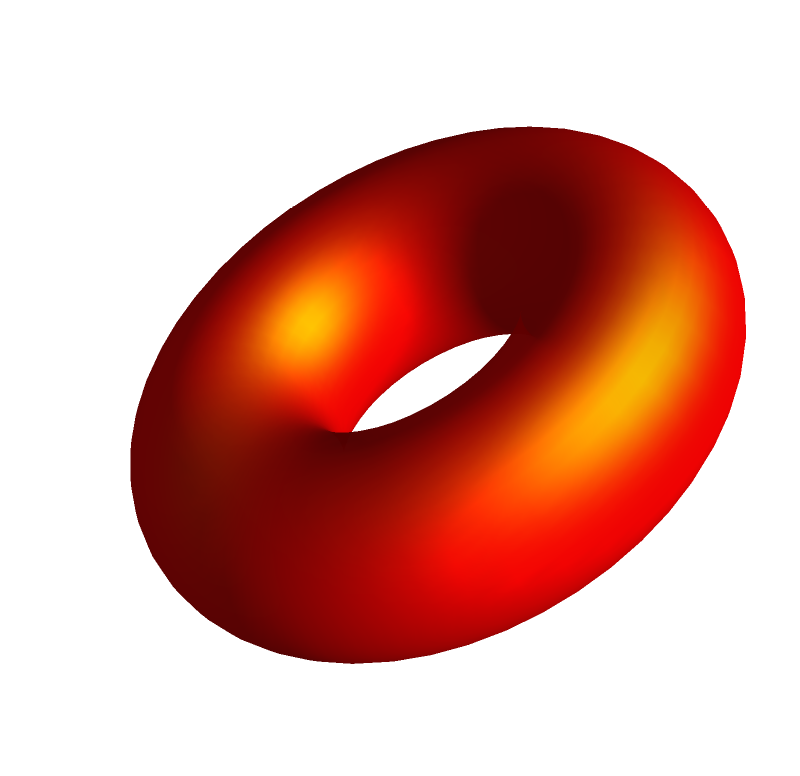
genus 1

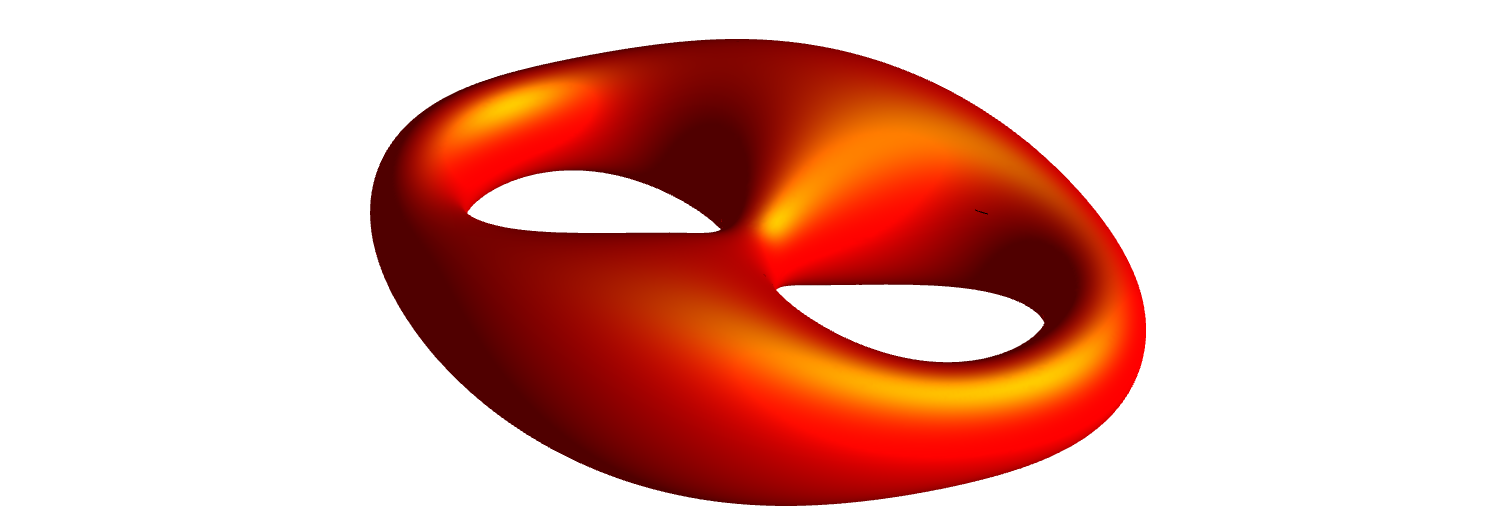
genus 2

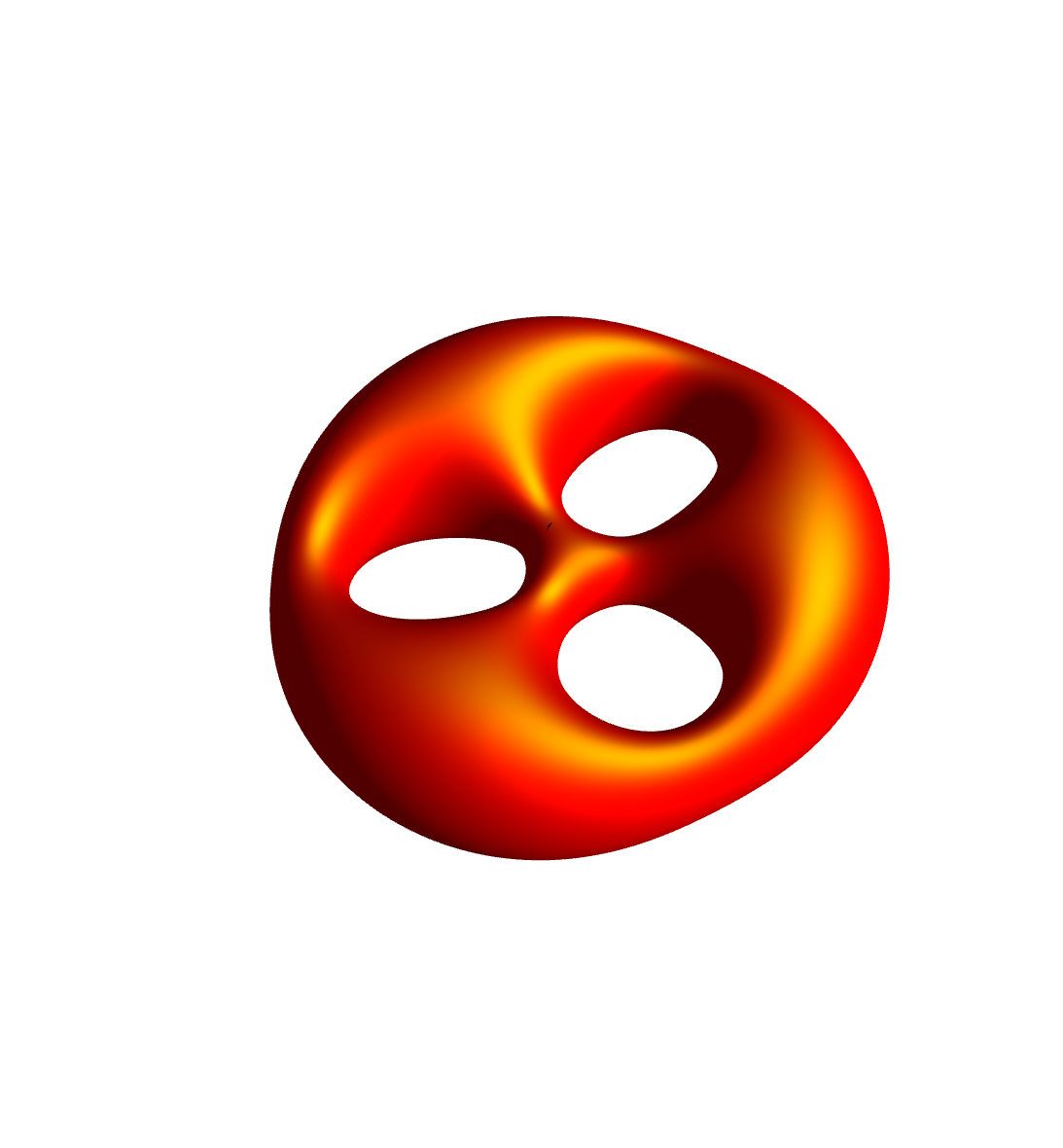
genus 3

The first case gives the 2-sphere, the unique 2-manifold with constant positive curvature and hence positive Euler characteristic (equal to 2). The second gives all flat 2-manifolds, i.e. the tori, which have Euler characteristic 0. The third case covers all 2-manifolds of constant negative curvature, i.e. the hyperbolic 2-manifolds all of which have negative Euler characteristic. The classification is consistent with the Gauss–Bonnet theorem, which implies that for a closed surface with constant curvature, the sign of that curvature must match the sign of the Euler characteristic. The Euler characteristic is equal to 2 – 2g, where g is the genus of the 2-manifold, i.e. the number of "holes".

== Methods of proof ==
Many classical proofs of the uniformization theorem rely on constructing a real-valued harmonic function on the simply connected Riemann surface, possibly with a singularity at one or two points and often corresponding to a form of Green's function. Four methods of constructing the harmonic function are widely employed: the Perron method; the Schwarz alternating method; Dirichlet's principle; and Weyl's method of orthogonal projection. In the context of closed Riemannian 2-manifolds, several modern proofs invoke nonlinear differential equations on the space of conformally equivalent metrics. These include the Beltrami equation from Teichmüller theory and an equivalent formulation in terms of harmonic maps; Liouville's equation, already studied by Poincaré; and Ricci flow along with other nonlinear flows.

Rado's theorem shows that every Riemann surface is automatically second-countable. Although Rado's theorem is often used in proofs of the uniformization theorem, some proofs have been formulated so that Rado's theorem becomes a consequence. Second countability is automatic for compact Riemann surfaces.

=== Hilbert space methods ===
In 1913 Hermann Weyl published his classic textbook "Die Idee der Riemannschen Fläche" based on his Göttingen lectures from 1911 to 1912. It was the first book to present the theory of Riemann surfaces in a modern setting and through its three editions has remained influential. Dedicated to Felix Klein, the first edition incorporated Hilbert's treatment of the Dirichlet problem using Hilbert space techniques; Brouwer's contributions to topology; and Koebe's proof of the uniformization theorem and its subsequent improvements. Much later Weyl (1940) developed his method of orthogonal projection which gave a streamlined approach to the Dirichlet problem, also based on Hilbert space; that theory, which included Weyl's lemma on elliptic regularity, was related to Hodge's theory of harmonic integrals; and both theories were subsumed into the modern theory of elliptic operators and L^{2} Sobolev spaces. In the third edition of his book from 1955, translated into English in Weyl (1964), Weyl adopted the modern definition of differential manifold, in preference to triangulations, but decided not to make use of his method of orthogonal projection. Springer (1957) followed Weyl's account of the uniformisation theorem, but used the method of orthogonal projection to treat the Dirichlet problem. Kodaira (2007) describes the approach in Weyl's book and also how to shorten it using the method of orthogonal projection. A related account can be found in Donaldson (2011).

=== Nonlinear flows ===
Richard S. Hamilton showed that the normalized Ricci flow on a closed surface uniformizes the metric (i.e., the flow converges to a constant curvature metric). However, his proof relied on the uniformization theorem. The missing step involved Ricci flow on the 2-sphere: a method for avoiding an appeal to the uniformization theorem (for genus 0) was provided by Chen, Lu & Tian (2006); a short self-contained account of Ricci flow on the 2-sphere was given in Andrews & Bryan (2010).

== Generalizations ==
Koebe proved the general uniformization theorem that if a Riemann surface is homeomorphic to an open subset of the complex sphere (or equivalently if every Jordan curve separates it), then it is conformally equivalent to an open subset of the complex sphere.

In 3 dimensions, there are 8 geometries, called the eight Thurston geometries. Not every 3-manifold admits a geometry, but Thurston's geometrization conjecture proved by Grigori Perelman states that every 3-manifold can be cut into pieces that are geometrizable.

The simultaneous uniformization theorem of Lipman Bers shows that it is possible to simultaneously uniformize two compact Riemann surfaces of the same genus >1 with the same quasi-Fuchsian group.

The measurable Riemann mapping theorem shows more generally that the map to an open subset of the complex sphere in the uniformization theorem can be chosen to be a quasiconformal map with any given bounded measurable Beltrami coefficient.

== See also ==
- Circle packing theorem, a discrete analogue of the uniformization theorem
