= Lipman Bers =

Latvian-American mathematician (1914–1993)

- Born: May 22, 1914; Riga, Governorate of Livonia
- Died: October 29, 1993 (aged 79); New Rochelle, New York, U.S.
- Citizenship: Latvian American
- Education: University of Zurich; University of Riga; University of Prague (PhD)
- Known for: Bers compactification Bers area inequality Bers slice Density theorem for Kleinian groups Measurable Riemann mapping theorem Pseudoanalytic function Simultaneous uniformization theorem Universal Teichmüller space
- Children: Victor Bers (son)
- Awards: Leroy P. Steele Prize (1975); Guggenheim Fellowship (1975)
- Scientific career
- Fields: Mathematics
- Workplaces: New York University; Columbia University; Brown University; Syracuse University
- Doctoral advisor: Charles Loewner
- Doctoral students: Enrico Arbarello; Jane Piore Gilman; Irwin Kra; Linda Keen; Bernard Maskit; Alexander Nagel; Murray H. Protter; Rubí Rodríguez; Lesley Sibner; Tilla Weinstein; Raymond O. Wells, Jr.

Lipman Bers (Latvian: Lipmans Berss; May 22, 1914 – October 29, 1993) was a Latvian-American mathematician, born in Riga, who created the theory of pseudoanalytic functions and worked on Riemann surfaces and Kleinian groups. He was also known for his work in human rights activism.

== Biography ==
Bers was born in Riga, then under the rule of the Russian Tsars, and spent several years as a child in Saint Petersburg after his hometown fell to invading Germany in 1915; his family returned to Riga in approximately 1919, by which time it was part of independent Latvia. In Riga, his mother was the principal of a Jewish elementary school, and his father became the principal of a Jewish high school, both of which Bers attended, with an interlude in Berlin while his mother, by then separated from his father, attended the Berlin Psychoanalytic Institute. After high school, Bers studied at the University of Zurich for a year, but had to return to Riga again because of the difficulty of transferring money from Latvia in the international financial crisis of the time. He continued his studies at the University of Riga, where he became active in socialist politics, including giving political speeches and working for an underground newspaper. In the aftermath of the 1934 Latvian coup d'état by right-wing leader Kārlis Ulmanis, Bers was targeted for arrest but fled the country, first to Estonia and then to Czechoslovakia.

Bers begun his studies at the University of Prague with Rudolf Carnap, but when Carnap moved to the US, he switched to Charles Loewner, who eventually became his thesis advisor. He received his Ph.D. in 1938. In Prague, he lived with an aunt, and married his wife Mary (née Kagan) whom he had met in elementary school and who had followed him from Riga. Having applied for postdoctoral studies in Paris, he was given a visa to go to France soon after the Munich Agreement, by which Nazi Germany annexed the Sudetenland. He and his wife Mary had a daughter in Paris. They were unable to obtain a visa there to emigrate to the US, as the Latvian quota had filled, so they escaped to the south of France ten days before the fall of Paris, and eventually obtained an emergency US visa in Marseilles, one of a group of 10,000 visas set aside for political refugees by Eleanor Roosevelt. The Bers family rejoined Bers' mother, who had by then moved to New York City and become a psychoanalyst, married to thespian Boris Tumarin. At this time, Bers worked for the YIVO Yiddish research agency.

Bers spent World War II teaching mathematics as a research associate at Brown University, where he was joined by Loewner. After the war, Bers found an assistant professorship at Syracuse University (1945–1951), before moving to New York University (1951–1964) and then Columbia University (1964–1984), where he became the Davies Professor of Mathematics, and where he chaired the mathematics department from 1972 to 1975. His move to NYU coincided with a move of his family to New Rochelle, New York, where he joined a small community of émigré mathematicians. He was a visiting scholar at the Institute for Advanced Study in 1949–51. He was a Vice-President (1963–65) and a President (1975–77) of the American Mathematical Society, chaired the Division of Mathematical Sciences of the United States National Research Council from 1969 to 1971, chaired the U.S. National Committee on Mathematics from 1977 to 1981, and chaired the Mathematics Section of the National Academy of Sciences from 1967 to 1970.

Late in his life, Bers suffered from Parkinson's disease and strokes. He died on October 29, 1993.

== Mathematical research ==
Bers' doctoral work was on the subject of potential theory. While in Paris, he worked on Green's function and on integral representations. After first moving to the US, while working for YIVO, he researched Yiddish mathematics textbooks rather than pure mathematics.

At Brown, he began working on problems of fluid dynamics, and in particular on the two-dimensional subsonic flows associated with cross-sections of airfoils. At this time, he began his work with Abe Gelbart on what eventually developed into the theory of pseudoanalytic functions. Through the 1940s and 1950s he continued to develop this theory, and to use it to study the planar elliptic partial differential equations associated with subsonic flows. Another of his major results in this time concerned the singularities of the partial differential equations defining minimal surfaces. Bers proved an extension of Riemann's theorem on removable singularities, showing that any isolated singularity of a pencil of minimal surfaces can be removed; he spoke on this result at the 1950 International Congress of Mathematicians and published it in Annals of Mathematics.

Later, beginning with his visit to the Institute for Advanced Study, Bers "began a ten-year odyssey that took him from pseudoanalytic functions and elliptic equations to quasiconformal mappings, Teichmüller theory, and Kleinian groups". With Lars Ahlfors, he solved the "moduli problem", of finding a holomorphic parameterization of the Teichmüller space, each point of which represents a compact Riemann surface of a given genus. During this period he also coined the popular phrasing of a question on eigenvalues of planar domains, "Can one hear the shape of a drum?", used as an article title by Mark Kac in 1966 and finally answered negatively in 1992 by an academic descendant of Bers. In the late 1950s, by way of adding a coda to his earlier work, Bers wrote several major retrospectives of flows, pseudoanalytic functions, fixed point methods, Riemann surface theory prior to his work on moduli, and the theory of several complex variables. In 1958, he presented his work on Riemann surfaces in a second talk at the International Congress of Mathematicians.

Bers' work on the parameterization of Teichmüller space led him in the 1960s to consider the boundary of the parameterized space, whose points corresponded to new types of Kleinian groups, eventually to be called singly-degenerate Kleinian groups. He applied Eichler cohomology, previously developed for applications in number theory and the theory of Lie groups, to Kleinian groups. He proved the Bers area inequality, an area bound for hyperbolic surfaces that became a two-dimensional precursor to William Thurston's work on geometrization of 3-manifolds and 3-manifold volume, and in this period Bers himself also studied the continuous symmetries of hyperbolic 3-space.

Quasi-Fuchsian groups may be mapped to a pair of Riemann surfaces by taking the quotient by the group of one of the two connected components of the complement of the group's limit set; fixing the image of one of these two maps leads to a subset of the space of Kleinian groups called a Bers slice. In 1970, Bers conjectured that the singly degenerate Kleinian surface groups can be found on the boundary of a Bers slice; this statement, known as the Bers density conjecture, was finally proven by Namazi, Souto, and Ohshika in 2010 and 2011. The Bers compactification of Teichmüller space also dates to this period.

== Advising ==
Over the course of his career, Bers advised approximately 50 doctoral students, among them Enrico Arbarello, Irwin Kra, Linda Keen, Murray H. Protter, and Lesley Sibner. Approximately a third of Bers' doctoral students were women, a high proportion for mathematics. Having felt neglected by his own advisor, Bers met regularly for meals with his students and former students, maintained a keen interest in their personal lives as well as their professional accomplishments, and kept up a friendly competition with Lars Ahlfors over who could bring to larger number of academic descendants to mathematical gatherings.

== Human rights activism ==
As a small child with his mother in Saint Petersburg, Bers had cheered the Russian Revolution and the rise of the Soviet Union, but by the late 1930s he had become disillusioned with communism after the assassination of Sergey Kirov and Stalin's ensuing purges. His son, Victor Bers, later said that "His experiences in Europe motivated his activism in the human rights movement," and Bers himself attributed his interest in human rights to the legacy of Menshevik leader Julius Martov. He founded the Committee on Human Rights of the National Academy of Sciences, and beginning in the 1970s worked to allow the emigration of dissident Soviet mathematicians including Yuri Shikhanovich, Leonid Plyushch, Valentin Turchin, and David and Gregory Chudnovsky. Within the U.S., he also opposed the American involvement in the Vietnam War and southeast Asia, and the maintenance of the U.S. nuclear arsenal during the Cold War.

== Awards and honors ==
In 1961, Bers was elected a Fellow of the American Academy of Arts and Sciences, and in 1965 he became a Fellow of the American Association for the Advancement of Science. He joined the National Academy of Sciences in 1964. He was a member of the Finnish Academy of Sciences, and the American Philosophical Society. He received the AMS Leroy P. Steele Prize for mathematical exposition in 1975 for his paper "Uniformization, moduli, and Kleinian groups". In 1986, the New York Academy of Sciences gave him their Human Rights Award. In the early 1980s, the Association for Women in Mathematics held a symposium to honor Bers' accomplishments in mentoring women mathematicians.

== Publications ==
=== Books ===
- Bers, Lipman (1953), Theory of pseudo-analytic functions, Institute for Mathematics and Mechanics, New York University, New York, MR 0057347
- Bers, Lipman (1958), Mathematical aspects of subsonic and transonic gas dynamics, New York: John Wiley & Sons
- Bers, Lipman (1976), Calculus, Holt, Rinehart and Winston, (in collaboration with Frank Karal)
- Bers, Lipman (1998), Kra, Irwin; Maskit, Bernard (eds.), Selected works of Lipman Bers. Part 1, Providence, R.I.: American Mathematical Society, ISBN 978-0-8218-0996-9, MR 1643465
- Bers, Lipman (1998), Kra, Irwin; Maskit, Bernard (eds.), Selected works of Lipman Bers. Part 2, Providence, R.I.: American Mathematical Society, ISBN 978-0-8218-0997-6, MR 1643469
- Lipman Bers, Fritz John, Martin Schechter (1964) Partial Differential Equations, Lectures in Applied Mathematics series V. 3A, American Mathematical Society.

=== Selected articles ===
- with Abe Gelbart: Bers, Lipman; Gelbart, Abe (1944). "On a class of functions defined by partial differential equations". Trans. Amer. Math. Soc. 56: 67–93. doi:10.1090/s0002-9947-1944-0010910-5. MR 0010910.
- Bers, Lipman (1948). "On rings of analytic functions". Bull. Amer. Math. Soc. 54 (4): 311–315. doi:10.1090/s0002-9904-1948-08992-3. MR 0024970.
- Bers, L. (February 1950). "Partial Differential Equations and Generalized Analytic Functions". Proc Natl Acad Sci U S A. 36 (2): 130–136. Bibcode:1950PNAS...36..130B. doi:10.1073/pnas.36.2.130. PMC 1063147. PMID 16588958.
- Bers, L. (January 1951). "Partial Differential Equations and Generalized Analytic Functions: Second Note". Proc Natl Acad Sci U S A. 37 (1): 42–47. Bibcode:1951PNAS...37...42B. doi:10.1073/pnas.37.1.42. PMC 1063297. PMID 16588987.
- Bers, Lipman (1951). "Boundary value problems for minimal surfaces with singularities at infinity". Trans. Amer. Math. Soc. 70 (3): 465–491. doi:10.1090/s0002-9947-1951-0043337-4. MR 0043337.
- with Shmuel Agmon: Agmon, Shmuel; Bers, Lipman (1952). "The expansion theorem for pseudo-analytic functions". Proc. Amer. Math. Soc. 3 (5): 757–764. doi:10.1090/s0002-9939-1952-0057349-4. MR 0057349.
- Bers, Lipman (1956). "An outline of the theory of pseudoanalytic functions". Bull. Amer. Math. Soc. 62 (4): 291–331. doi:10.1090/s0002-9904-1956-10037-2. MR 0081936.
- Bers, Lipman (1957). "On a theorem of Mori and the definition of quasiconformality". Trans. Amer. Math. Soc. 84: 78–84. doi:10.1090/s0002-9947-1957-0083025-7. MR 0083025.
- Bers, Lipman (1960). "Simultaneous uniformization". Bull. Amer. Math. Soc. 66 (2): 94–97. doi:10.1090/s0002-9904-1960-10413-2. MR 0111834.
- Bers, Lipman (1960). "Spaces of Riemann surfaces as bounded domains". Bull. Amer. Math. Soc. 66 (2): 98–103. doi:10.1090/s0002-9904-1960-10415-6. MR 0111835.
- Bers, Lipman (1961). "Holomorphic differentials as functions of moduli". Bull. Amer. Math. Soc. 67 (2): 206–210. doi:10.1090/s0002-9904-1961-10569-7. MR 0122989.
- with Leon Ehrenpreis: Bers, Lipman; Ehrenpreis, Leon (1964). "Holomorphic convexity of Teichmüller spaces". Bull. Amer. Math. Soc. 70 (6): 761–764. doi:10.1090/s0002-9904-1964-11230-1. MR 0168800.
- Bers, Lipman (1974). "On spaces of Riemann surfaces with nodes". Bull. Amer. Math. Soc. 80 (6): 1219–1222. doi:10.1090/s0002-9904-1974-13686-4. MR 0361165.
- Bers, Lipman (1977). "Quasiconformal mappings with applications to differential equations, function theory and topology". Bull. Amer. Math. Soc. 83 (6): 1083–1100. doi:10.1090/s0002-9904-1977-14390-5. MR 0463433.
- Bers, Lipman (1981). "Finite dimensional Teichmüller spaces and generalizations". Bull. Amer. Math. Soc. (N.S.). 5 (2): 131–172. doi:10.1090/s0273-0979-1981-14933-8. MR 0621883.
