= Indra's Pearls (book) =

2002 book on fractal geometry

- Author: David Mumford, Caroline Series, David Wright
- Language: English
- Subject: Geometry
- Genre: Non-fiction
- Publisher: Cambridge University Press
- Publication date: 2002, 2015
- Publication place: United Kingdom
- Media type: Print (hardback, paperback)
- ISBN: 978-0-521-35253-6
- OCLC: 49859120

Indra's Pearls: The Vision of Felix Klein is a geometry book written by David Mumford, Caroline Series and David Wright, and published by Cambridge University Press in 2002 and 2015.

The book explores the patterns created by iterating conformal maps of the complex plane called Möbius transformations, and their connections with symmetry and self-similarity. These patterns were glimpsed by German mathematician Felix Klein, but modern computer graphics allows them to be fully visualised and explored in detail.

== Title ==
The book's title refers to Indra's net, a metaphorical object described in the Buddhist text of the Flower Garland Sutra. Indra's net consists of an infinite array of gossamer strands and pearls. The frontispiece to Indra's Pearls quotes the following description:

In the glistening surface of each pearl are reflected all the other pearls ... In each reflection, again are reflected all the infinitely many other pearls, so that by this process, reflections of reflections continue without end.

The allusion to Felix Klein's "vision" is a reference to Klein's early investigations of Schottky groups and hand-drawn plots of their limit sets. It also refers to Klein's wider vision of the connections between group theory, symmetry and geometry - see Erlangen program.

== Contents ==
The contents of Indra's Pearls are as follows:

The Apollonian gasket, which appears in Chapter 7.

- Chapter 1. The language of symmetry – an introduction to the mathematical concept of symmetry and its relation to geometric groups.
- Chapter 2. A delightful fiction – an introduction to complex numbers and mappings of the complex plane and the Riemann sphere.
- Chapter 3. Double spirals and Möbius maps – Möbius transformations and their classification.
- Chapter 4. The Schottky dance – pairs of Möbius maps which generate Schottky groups; plotting their limit sets using breadth-first searches.
- Chapter 5. Fractal dust and infinite words – Schottky limit sets regarded as fractals; computer generation of these fractals using depth-first searches and iterated function systems.
- Chapter 6. Indra's necklace – the continuous limit sets generated when pairs of generating circles touch.
- Chapter 7. The glowing gasket – the Schottky group whose limit set is the Apollonian gasket; links to the modular group.
- Chapter 8. Playing with parameters – parameterising Schottky groups with parabolic commutator using two complex parameters; using these parameters to explore the Teichmüller space of Schottky groups.
- Chapter 9. Accidents will happen – introducing Maskit's slice, parameterised by a single complex parameter; exploring the boundary between discrete and non-discrete groups.
- Chapter 10. Between the cracks – further exploration of the Maskit boundary between discrete and non-discrete groups in another slice of parameter space; identification and exploration of degenerate groups.
- Chapter 11. Crossing boundaries – ideas for further exploration, such as adding a third generator.
- Chapter 12. Epilogue – concluding overview of non-Euclidean geometry and Teichmüller theory.

== Importance ==
Indra's Pearls is unusual because it aims to give the reader a sense of the development of a real-life mathematical investigation, rather than just a formal presentation of the final results. It covers a broad span of topics, showing interconnections among geometry, number theory, abstract algebra and computer graphics. It shows how computers are used by contemporary mathematicians. It uses computer graphics, diagrams and cartoons to enhance its written explanations. In the authors' own words:

Our dream is that this book will reveal to our readers that mathematics is not alien and remote but just a very human exploration of the patterns of the world, one which thrives on play and surprise and beauty - Indra's Pearls p viii.
