= Finiteness theorem =

In mathematics, there are several finiteness theorems.

- Ahlfors finiteness theorem
- Finiteness theorem for a proper morphism

== See also ==
- Compactness theorem, in mathematical logic
