= Sonja Morawetz Sinclair =

Czechoslovak-born Canadian journalist and author (1921–2024)

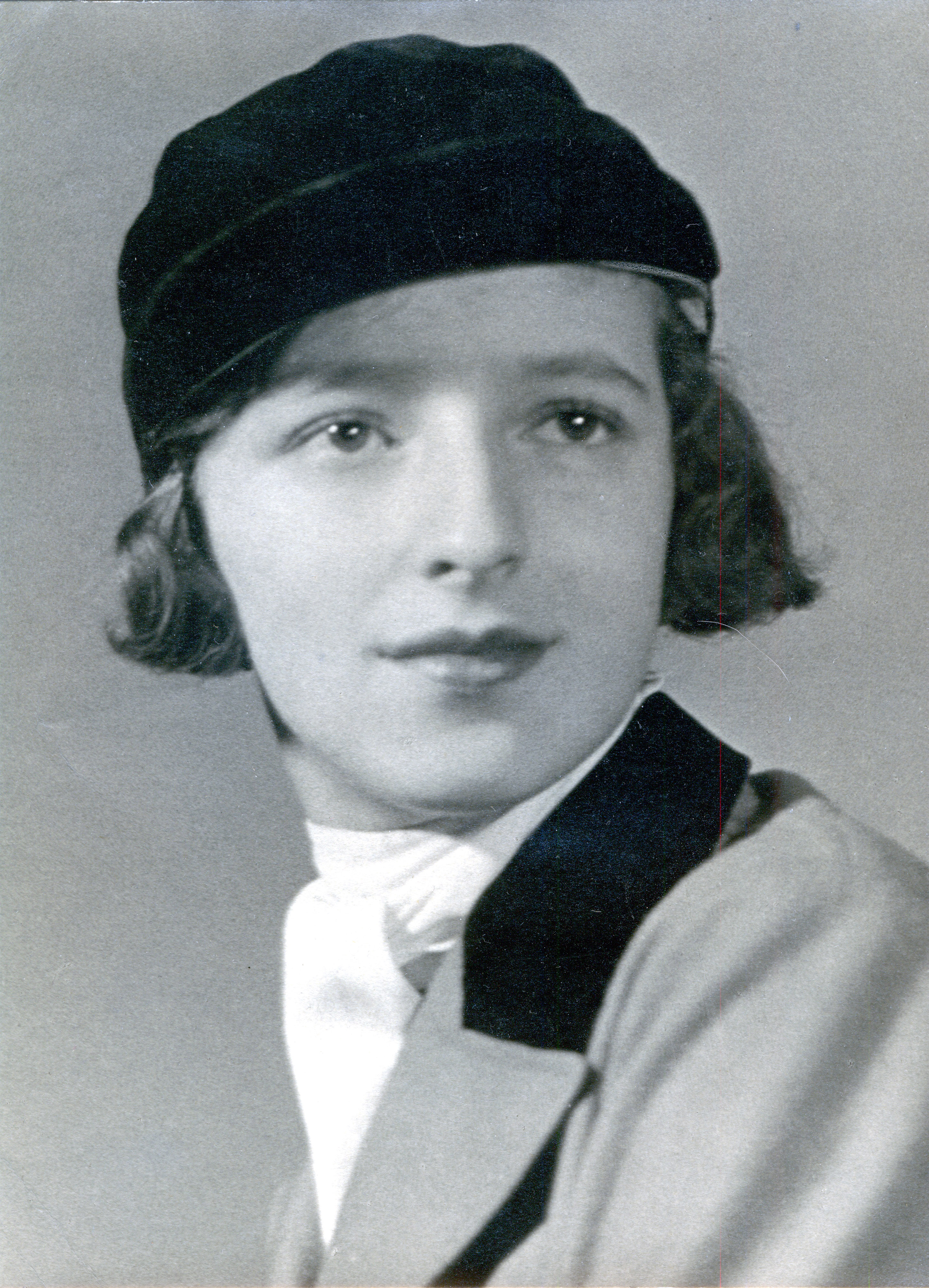
- Born: December 3, 1921; Úpice, Czechoslovakia
- Died: May 23, 2024 (aged 102); Toronto, Ontario, Canada
- Occupations: Author; journalist; cryptographer
- Spouse: Ric Sinclair (m. 1945; died 2006)
- Children: 3

Sonja Morawetz Sinclair (December 3, 1921 – May 23, 2024) was a Czechoslovak-born Canadian journalist, author, and cryptographer. From the 1950s to the 1990s she worked independently for major Canadian publications including Time, Canadian Broadcasting Corporation, Maclean's, Chatelaine, Canadian Business, Financial Post, authored four books and worked as director of communication for Price Waterhouse. In June 2017 she was honoured by the British government for her service as a World War II codebreaker for an Ottawa branch of Bletchley Park signals intelligence between 1943 and 1945. She kept her wartime intelligence service secret from her closest family and friends for over seven decades.

== Personal life ==
Morawetz Sinclair was born in Úpice, Czechoslovakia, on December 3, 1921, to parents Frida Glaser Morawetz and industrialist Richard Morawetz. She grew up in Prague. In late 1938, she fled Czechoslovakia through Nazi Germany to Great Britain. She spent a year at Badminton School in Bristol before moving to Canada. As a student at Trinity College, University of Toronto, she served as editor-in-chief of the Trinity Review.

Morawetz Sinclair's sister-in-law Cathleen Synge Morawetz was a distinguished mathematician at NYU. Her brother Herbert Morawetz was also a notable chemist at NYU. Her brother Oskar Morawetz was a notable classical music composer.

Morawetz married Ric Sinclair in 1945; he died in 2006. They had two sons and a daughter. Sonja Sinclair died in Toronto on May 23, 2024, at the age of 102.

== World War II Codebreaker ==
Between 1943 and 1945, Morawetz Sinclair worked as a World War II codebreaker for an Ottawa extension of Bletchley Park signals intelligence. She was sworn to secrecy and did not reveal her work to her friends or family for over 70 years. In 2017 she was awarded the Bletchley Park Commemorative Badge for her service.

== Mikhail Baryshnikov defection ==
In 1974, Morawetz Sinclair's family helped Mikhail Baryshnikov defect from the USSR. Baryshnikov sprinted away after a performance in downtown Toronto to a waiting getaway car that took him to a farm near Markham, Ontario. He stayed there for a couple of days until journalists caught up to him, at which point he moved to a cottage on Lake Muskoka owned by Morawetz Sinclair's family. He remained there until he was assured the Canadian government would not extradite him. Baryshnikov settled in New York City quickly thereafter.

== Bibliography ==
- Morawetz Sinclair, Sonja (1969). I presume you can type: The mature woman's guide to second careers. Toronto, Ontario: Canadian Broadcasting Corporation. OCLC 83269.
- Morawetz Sinclair, Sonja (1979). Cordial but not cosy: A history of the Office of the Auditor General. Toronto, Ontario: McClelland & Stewart. ISBN 9780771081576.
- Ignatieff, George; Morawetz Sinclair, Sonja (1985). The making of a peacemonger: The memoirs of George Ignatieff. Toronto, Ontario: University of Toronto Press. ISBN 9780802025562.
- Bata, Thomas J.; Morawetz Sinclair, Sonja (1990). Bata: Shoemaker to the world. Toronto, Ontario: Stoddart Publishing. ISBN 9780773724167.
