= Abe Gelbart =

American mathematician (1911–1994)

- Born: Abraham Markham Gelbart; December 2, 1911; Paterson, New Jersey, U.S.
- Died: September 7, 1994 (aged 82)
- Education: Dalhousie University (BA); Massachusetts Institute of Technology (PhD)
- Years active: 1943–1992
- Children: 1, including Stephen Gelbart
- Relatives: Charles Fefferman (nephew)

Abraham Markham Gelbart (December 2, 1911 – September 7, 1994) was an American mathematician, the founding dean of the Belfer Graduate School of Science at Yeshiva University and the namesake of the International Research Institute for Mathematical Sciences at Bar-Ilan University in Ramat Gan, Israel.

== Biography ==
Gelbart was born to a Polish immigrant family in Paterson, New Jersey. He dropped out of high school at age 14, but studied mathematics at the New York Public Library, where he came under the mentorship of Yeshiva mathematician Jekuthiel Ginsburg. Despite not having a high school diploma, he was accepted to Dalhousie University at age 23, and earned a bachelor's degree there in 1938. He did his graduate studies at the Massachusetts Institute of Technology, earning a doctorate in 1940 under the supervision of Norbert Wiener.

After taking non-tenure-track positions at North Carolina State College, Brown University, and NASA's Langley Research Center, Gelbart took a faculty position at Syracuse University in 1943. He remained there until 1958, when he moved to Yeshiva, taking the position and the editorship of Scripta Mathematica both formerly held by his mentor Ginsburg. He retired from Yeshiva in 1979, and took a position as Distinguished Professor at Bard College, where he remained until 1992. He was also a trustee of Bar-Ilan university. His doctoral students include Robert Finn. Gelbart died from complications following cardiovascular surgery.

== Mathematics ==
With Lipman Bers, Gelbart founded the theory of pseudoanalytic functions in fluid dynamics.

== Awards and honors ==
Gelbart was given an honorary doctorate by Dalhousie University in 1972, and by Bar-Ilan University in 1985. In 1981, Bard College gave him the Bard Medal.

== Personal life ==
Gelbart is the father of Stephen Gelbart, also a noted mathematician. He is also the uncle of mathematician Charles Fefferman.
