= Caroline Series =

English mathematician (born 1951)

Caroline Series CBE FRS
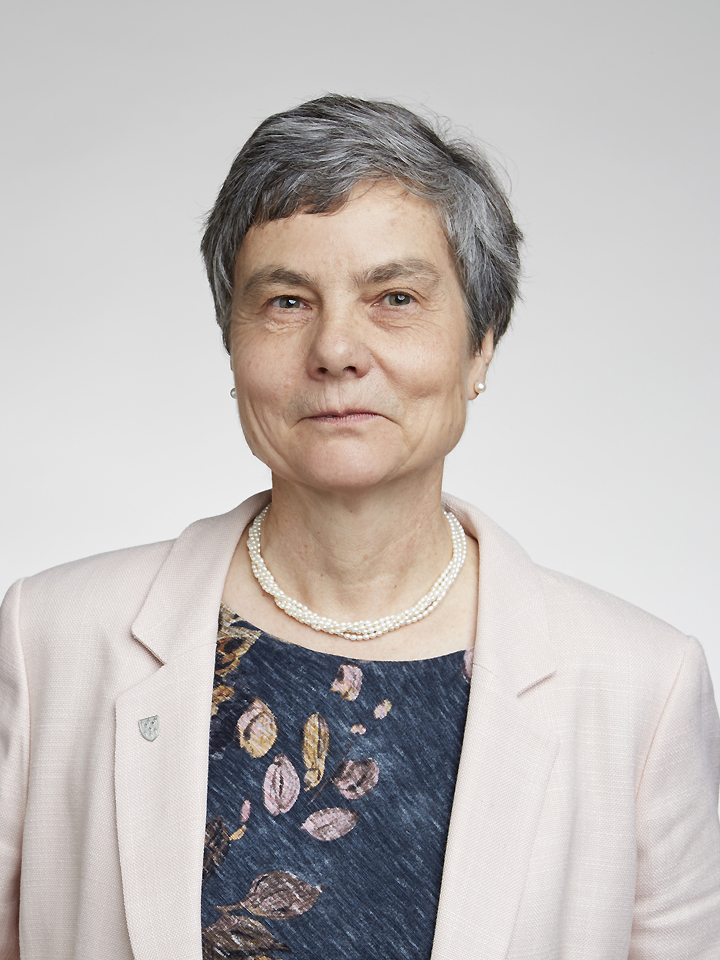
- Series in 2016
- Born: 24 March 1951 (age 75); Oxford, England
- Education: Oxford High School for Girls
- Alma mater: Somerville College, Oxford (BA); Harvard University (PhD)
- Father: George Series
- Awards: Whitehead Prize (1987); Fellow of the Royal Society (2016); David Crighton Medal (2021)
- Scientific career
- Fields: Hyperbolic geometry; Kleinian groups; Dynamical systems
- Workplaces: University of California, Berkeley; Newnham College, Cambridge; University of Warwick
- Thesis: Ergodic action of product groups (1976)
- Doctoral advisor: George Mackey
- Doctoral students: Ralf J. Spatzier
- Website: homepages.warwick.ac.uk/~masbb/

Caroline Mary Series CBE FRS (born 24 March 1951) is an English mathematician known for her work in hyperbolic geometry, Kleinian groups and dynamical systems.

== Early life and education ==
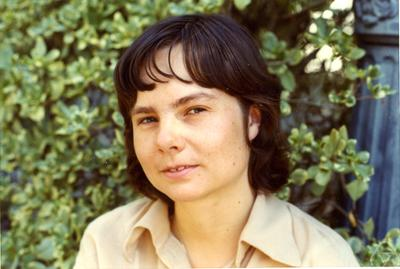
Caroline in 1976

Series was born on March 24, 1951, in Oxford to Annette and George Series. She attended Oxford High School for Girls and from 1969 studied at Somerville College, Oxford, where she was interviewed for admission by Anne Cobbe. She obtained a B.A. in Mathematics in 1972 and was awarded the university Mathematical Prize. She was awarded a Kennedy Scholarship and studied at Harvard University from 1972, obtaining her Ph.D. in 1976 supervised by George Mackey on the Ergodicity of product groups.

== Career and research ==
In 1976–77 she was a lecturer at University of California, Berkeley, and in 1977–78 she was a research fellow at Newnham College, Cambridge. From 1978 she was at the University of Warwick, first as a lecturer, then, from 1987, as a reader, and from 1992 as a professor. From 1999 to 2004 she was Engineering and Physical Sciences Research Council (EPSRC) Senior Research Fellow at the University of Warwick.

In the 1970s, Series found illustrations of Rufus Bowen's Theory of Dynamic Systems in the geometry of continued fractions and two-dimensional hyperbolic geometry, effect of Fuchsian groups. After that she investigated similar, including fractal, geometric patterns in three-dimensional hyperbolic spaces, with Kleinian groups as symmetry groups. The computer images led to a book project with David Mumford and David Wright, which took over ten years. Other coauthors with whom she published in this area include Linda Keen and Joan Birman.

Series became the third woman to be president of the London Mathematical Society when she held the post in 2017–2019.

She is emeritus professor in mathematics at the University of Warwick.

=== Selected publications ===
- with David Mumford and David Wright: Indra's Pearls. Cambridge University Press 2002.
- Series, Caroline (1985). "The geometry of Markoff numbers". The Mathematical Intelligencer. 7 (3). Springer Science and Business Media LLC: 20–29. doi:10.1007/bf03025802. ISSN 0343-6993. S2CID 122241136.
- Series, Caroline (1982). "Non-euclidean geometry, continued fractions, and ergodic theory". The Mathematical Intelligencer. 4 (1). Springer Science and Business Media LLC: 24–31. doi:10.1007/bf03022992. ISSN 0343-6993. S2CID 120656792.
- Series, C. (8 September 1987). "Some geometrical models of chaotic dynamics". Proceedings of the Royal Society of London. A. Mathematical and Physical Sciences. 413 (1844). The Royal Society: 171–182. Bibcode:1987RSPSA.413..171S. doi:10.1098/rspa.1987.0108. ISSN 0080-4630. S2CID 125057548.
- Series, Wright Non euclidean geometry and Indra´s Pearls, Plus Magazine
- Bedford, T.; Keane, M. S.; Series, Caroline (1991). Ergodic theory, symbolic dynamics, and hyperbolic spaces. Oxford: Oxford University Press. ISBN 0-19-853390-X. OCLC 22508872.

=== Honours and awards ===
In 1987 she was awarded the Junior Whitehead Prize by the London Mathematical Society. In 1992 she held the Rouse Ball Lecture in Cambridge, and in 1986 she was the invited speaker at the International Congress of Mathematicians in Berkeley (Symbolic Dynamics for Geodesic Flows). From 1990 to 2001 she was the editor of the Student Texts of the London Mathematical Society. In 1986 she was a founding member of European Women in Mathematics (EWM). In 2009 she was the Emmy Noether visiting professor at the University of Göttingen. She was elected a Fellow of the American Mathematical Society in its inaugural class of 2013. She is an Honorary Fellow of Somerville College.

- 1972–74 Kennedy Scholarship, Harvard University
- 1987 Junior Whitehead Prize, London Mathematical Society
- 2014 Senior Anne Bennett Prize, London Mathematical Society
- 2016 Fellow of the Royal Society
- 2017 Elected to the Academia Europaea
- 2021 David Crighton Medal, London Mathematical Society

Series was appointed Commander of the Order of the British Empire (CBE) in the 2023 Birthday Honours for services to mathematics.

== Personal life ==
She is the daughter of the physicist George Series.
