= Irwin Kra =

American mathematician (born 1937)

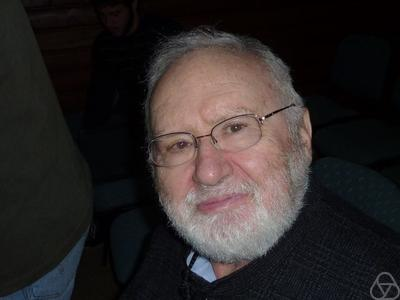
- Irwin Kra
- Born: January 5, 1937 (age 89); Krasnosielc, Poland
- Education: Columbia University; Polytechnic Institute of Brooklyn
- Scientific career
- Fields: Mathematics
- Doctoral advisor: Lipman Bers

Irwin Kra (born January 5, 1937) is an American mathematician, who works on the function theory in complex analysis.

== Life and work ==
Kra studied at Polytechnic Institute of Brooklyn (bachelor's degree in 1960) and at Columbia University, where he graduated in 1964 and received his doctorate in 1966 under supervision of Lipman Bers (Conformal Structure and Algebraic Structure). After that, he was from 1966 to 1968 a C.L.E. Moore instructor at Massachusetts Institute of Technology and then at the State University of New York at Stony Brook, where he chaired from 1975 to 1981 the Faculty of Mathematics. From 1991 to 1996, there, he was Dean of the Division of Physical Sciences and Mathematics. Since 2004 he has been Professor Emeritus. He was a visiting professor at the Hebrew University in Jerusalem (where he collaborated with Hershel M. Farkas), the University of Perugia in Santiago de Chile, the Tohoku University, the Fudan University in Shanghai (1987). From 2004 to 2008 he was Director of Math for America, a private organization that is dedicated to the improvement of college education in mathematics in the United States. He currently lives in New York City. In 2010 he taught at the Northwestern University.

From 1972 to 1973 he was a Guggenheim Fellow. In 2012 he became a fellow of the American Mathematical Society.

Kra studies Riemann surfaces and their moduli spaces (Teichmüller spaces) and their connection with Kleinian groups and associated automorphic forms and their applications for example in number theory.

With Bernard Maskit in 1998, he published the collected works of Lipman Bers on function theory.

== Family relations ==
Irwin Kra has three children. He is the father of mathematician Bryna Kra, climate tech venture capitalist Gabriel Kra, and Douglas Kra.

== Writings ==
=== Books ===
- With Jane P. Gilman, Rubí E. Rodríguez Complex Analysis in the spirit of Lipman Bers, Springer Verlag, 2007
- With Hershel M. Farkas Riemann Surfaces, Springer Verlag, 1980, 2nd edn. August 1992
- With Farkas: Theta constants, Riemann surfaces, and the modular group: an introduction with applications to uniformization theorems, partition identities and combinatorial number theory, Providence, American Mathematical Society 2001
- With Lipman Bers (editors): Crash course on Kleinian Groups, Springer 1974
- Automorphic forms and Kleinian Groups, Benjamin 1972
- Lipman Bers, a Life in Mathematics, Eds. I. Kra, R. Rodriguez, L. Keen, Amer. Math. Soc., Providence, RI, 2015.

=== Selected articles ===
- "On the ring of functions on an open Riemann surface". Trans. Amer. Math. Soc. 132: 231–244. 1968. doi:10.1090/s0002-9947-1968-0226043-5. MR 0226043.
- Kra, I. (July 1969). "Cohomology of Kleinian groups". Proc Natl Acad Sci U S A. 63 (3): 655–660. Bibcode:1969PNAS...63..655K. doi:10.1073/pnas.63.3.655. PMC 223501. PMID 16591774.
- Kra, Irwin (1971). "A generalization of a theorem of Poincaré". Proc. Amer. Math. Soc. 27 (2): 299–302. doi:10.1090/s0002-9939-1971-0301189-7. MR 0301189.
- with B. Maskit: Kra, I.; Maskit, B. (1972). "Involutions on Kleinian groups". Bull. Amer. Math. Soc. 78 (5): 801–805. doi:10.1090/s0002-9904-1972-13042-8. MR 0301190.
- Kra, Irwin (1981). "Canonical mappings between Teichmüller spaces". Bull. Amer. Math. Soc. (N.S.). 4 (2): 143–179. doi:10.1090/s0273-0979-1981-14870-9. MR 0598682.
- Kra, Irwin (1983). "On the vanishing of Poincaré series of rational functions". Bull. Amer. Math. Soc. (N.S.). 8: 63–66. doi:10.1090/s0273-0979-1983-15085-1. MR 0682823.
- Kra, Irwin (1989). "Accessory parameters for punctured spheres". Trans. Amer. Math. Soc. 313 (2): 589–617. doi:10.1090/s0002-9947-1989-0958896-0. MR 0958896.
- "Horocyclic coordinates for Riemann surfaces and moduli spaces. I: Teichmüller and Riemann spaces of Kleinian groups". J. Amer. Math. Soc. 3: 499–578. 1990. doi:10.1090/s0894-0347-1990-1049503-1. MR 1049503.
- with Hershel M. Farkas: Farkas, Hershel M.; Kra, Irwin (1999). "On the quintuple product identity". Proc. Amer. Math. Soc. 127 (3): 771–778. doi:10.1090/S0002-9939-99-04791-7. MR 1487364.
- "Cusp forms associated to rank 2 subgroups of Kleinian groups". Proc. Amer. Math. Soc. 111: 803–814. 1991. doi:10.1090/s0002-9939-1991-1056679-1. MR 1056679.
- with C. J. Earle and S. L. Krushkal´: Earle, C. J.; Kra, I.; Krushkalь, S. L. (1994). "Holomorphic motions and Teichmüller spaces". Trans. Amer. Math. Soc. 343 (2): 927–948. doi:10.1090/s0002-9947-1994-1214783-6. MR 1214783.
