= Emanuel R. Piore =

Lithuanian scientist (1908–2000)

Emanuel (Mannie) Ruben Piore (19 July 1908 – 9 May 2000) was a scientist and a manager of industrial research.

Piore was born on 19 July 1908 in Vilnius, Lithuania, to a Jewish family. In 1917, his family moved to the United States, and in 1924, he became a naturalized citizen of the United States.

Piore obtained an undergraduate and a PhD degree in physics, both from the University of Wisconsin–Madison. He worked at the Radio Corporation of America, the US Navy (where he became the first civilian to head the Office of Naval Research) and, subsequently, the Avco Manufacturing Corporation, before being hired as the first director of research of IBM.

Under his direction, the architect Eero Saarinen designed and built the IBM Thomas J. Watson Research Center at Yorktown Heights, New York. As director of research at IBM, he encouraged basic research and the building up of a patent portfolio. He also established the IBM Fellow program, which allowed top researchers to pursue their own interests for a period of time. He was promoted to vice president and group executive, and chief scientist and served IBM as a member of the board of directors and of the advisory committee to the board. In 1967, his leadership at IBM was recognized by the Industrial Research Institute when it awarded him the illustrious IRI Medal.

In 1976, the IEEE established the IEEE Emanuel R. Piore Award, for "outstanding achievement in the field of information processing". Piore was an elected member of the American Academy of Arts and Sciences, the United States National Academy of Sciences, and the American Philosophical Society. His daughter, Jane Piore Gilman, is a distinguished professor of mathematics at Rutgers University. His son, Michael J. Piore is a professor of economics and political science at the Massachusetts Institute of Technology.
