= Hans Weinberger =

Austrian-American mathematician (1928-2017)

Hans F. Weinberger (September 27, 1928 in Vienna – September 15, 2017 in Durham, North Carolina) was an Austrian-American mathematician, known for his contributions to variational methods for eigenvalue problems, partial differential equations, and fluid dynamics.

He obtained an M.S. in physics from Carnegie Institute of Technology (1948) where he also got his Sc.D. on the thesis Fourier Transforms of Moebius Series advised by Richard Duffin (1950). He then worked at the institute for Fluid Dynamics at University of Maryland, College Park (1950–60), and as professor at University of Minnesota (1961–98) where he was department head (1967–69) and now is Professor Emeritus (1998–). Weinberger was the first director of Institute for Mathematics and its Applications (1981–87). Weinberger served as the IMA's first director from 1982 to 1987, and under his leadership, the IMA quickly became known for cutting-edge scientific programs, a collaborative atmosphere, and as a training ground for postdoctoral researchers. During his tenure, Weinberger was very engaged in scientific life at the IMA, attending lectures and collaborating with visitors and postdocs. His presence at these lectures usually meant that the toughest and most penetrating questions were asked.

While well known for his contributions to the analysis of partial differential equations, especially eigenvalue problems, Weinberger turned his attention to mathematical biology later in his career. He remained active in research throughout his life and authored several papers after his retirement in 1998. Weinberger was elected a member of the American Academy of Arts and Sciences in 1986 and was in the inaugural class of the American Mathematical Society Fellows in 2012 American Mathematical Society.

== Selected articles ==
- Weinberger, H. F. (1952). "An inequality with alternating signs". Proc Natl Acad Sci U S A. 38 (7): 611–613. Bibcode:1952PNAS...38..611W. doi:10.1073/pnas.38.7.611. PMC 1063623. PMID 16589155.
- with J. B. Diaz: Weinberger, H. F. (1952). "Error estimation in the Weinstein method for eigenvalues". Proc. Amer. Math. Soc. 3 (4): 643–646. doi:10.1090/s0002-9939-1952-0050177-5. MR 0050177.
- Diaz, J. B.; Weinberger, H. F. (1953). "A solution of the singular initial value problem for the Euler-Poisson-Darboux equation". Proc. Amer. Math. Soc. 4 (5): 703–715. doi:10.1090/s0002-9939-1953-0058099-1. MR 0058099.
- Weinberger, H.F. (1960). "Error bounds in the Rayleigh-Ritz approximation of eigenvectors" (PDF). Journal of Research of the National Bureau of Standards. 64B (4): 216–225. doi:10.6028/jres.064b.023.
- Weinberger, H. F. (1964). "On bounding harmonic functions by linear interpolation". Bull. Amer. Math. Soc. 70 (4): 525–529. doi:10.1090/s0002-9904-1964-11183-6. MR 0162953.
- with M. H. Protter: Protter, M. H.; Weinberger, H. F. (1966). "On the spectrum of general second order operators". Bull. Amer. Math. Soc. 72 (2): 251–255. doi:10.1090/s0002-9904-1966-11485-4. MR 0190527.

== Books ==
- A First Course in Partial Differential Equations (Dover, 1995)
- Maximum Principles in Differential Equations (Prentice-Hall, 1967; Springer, 1985). With Murray H. Protter.
- Variational Methods for Eigenvalue Approximation, C.B.M.S. Regional Conference Series in Applied Mathematics #15, S.I.A.M., Philadelphia, 1974.

== See also ==
- Davis–Kahan–Weinberger dilation theorem
