= Herbert Clemens =

American mathematician

- Born: 15 August 1939 (age 87); Dayton, Ohio, U.S.
- Education: College of the Holy Cross (BA); University of California, Berkeley (PhD)
- Known for: Clemens conjecture
- Awards: Sloan Research Fellowship; Invited Speaker, International Congress of Mathematicians (1974, 1986)
- Scientific career
- Fields: Algebraic geometry
- Workplaces: Columbia University; University of Utah; Ohio State University
- Thesis: Picard-Lefschetz Theorem for Families of Algebraic Varieties Acquiring Certain Singularities (1966)
- Doctoral advisor: Phillip Griffiths
- Doctoral students: Enrico Arbarello

Charles Herbert Clemens Jr. (born 15 August 1939) is an American mathematician specializing in complex algebraic geometry.

== Biography ==
Clemens graduated from the College of the Holy Cross in Worcester, Massachusetts, with a Bachelor of Arts, magna cum laude, in mathematics in 1961. He then earned his Ph.D. in mathematics from the University of California, Berkeley, under Phillip Griffiths. His doctoral dissertation was titled, Picard–Lefschetz Theorem for Families of Algebraic Varieties Acquiring Certain Singularities. In 1970, he became an assistant professor at Columbia University and went on to become an associate professor before leaving in 1975 to become an associate professor at the University of Utah, where he became a full professor in 1976 and a Distinguished Professor in 2001. In 2002, he left Utah to become a professor of mathematics and mathematics education at Ohio State University.

Clemens was a visiting scholar at the Institute for Advanced Study from September 1968 to March 1970 and from September 2001 to June 2003. He was an invited speaker at the International Congress of Mathematicians in 1976 at Vancouver and in 1986 at Berkeley and gave a talk Curves on higher dimensional complex projective manifolds. For the academic year 1974–1975 he was a Sloan Fellow.

In 1972 Clemens and Griffiths proved that a cubic three-fold is in general not a rational variety, providing an example for three dimensions that unirationality does not imply rationality. In 1986 Clemens was an editor of the Pacific Journal of Mathematics.

He married in 1983 and has three children.

== Selected publications ==
=== Articles ===
- Clemens, C. H. Jr. (1969). "Picard–Lefschetz theorem for families of nonsingular algebraic varieties acquiring ordinary singularities". Transactions of the American Mathematical Society. 136: 93–108. doi:10.1090/s0002-9947-1969-0233814-9. MR 0233814.
- Clemens, C. Herbert; Griffiths, Phillip A. (1972). "The intermediate Jacobian of the cubic threefold". Annals of Mathematics. 95 (2): 281–356. CiteSeerX 10.1.1.401.4550. doi:10.2307/1970801. JSTOR 1970801. MR 0302652.
- Clemens, Herbert (1983). "Homological equivalence, modulo algebraic equivalence, is not finitely generated" (PDF). Publications Mathématiques de l'IHÉS. 58: 19–38. doi:10.1007/bf02953771. MR 0720930. S2CID 122757669.
- Clemens, Herbert (1986). "Curves on generic hypersurfaces" (PDF). Annales Scientifiques de l'École Normale Supérieure. 19 (4): 629–636. doi:10.24033/asens.1521. MR 0875091.

=== Books ===
- Clemens, C. Herbert (1980). A scrapbook of complex curve theory. New York–London: Plenum Press. ISBN 9780821833070. MR 0614289.
- as editor with: János Kollár: Current topics in complex algebraic geometry. Cambridge University Press. 1995. ISBN 9780521562447.
- with Michael A. Clemens: Geometry for the class room, Springer 1991
- as editor with Spencer Bloch and others: Algebraic Geometry: Bowdoin 1985, 2 vols., AMS 1987; Bloch, Spencer; Geometry, Summer Research Institute on Algebraic (1987). Part 1. American Mathematical Soc. ISBN 9780821814765. Bloch, Spencer; Geometry, Summer Research Institute on Algebraic (1987). Part 2. American Mathematical Soc. ISBN 9780821814802.
- as co-contributor with Alessio Corti to the book authored by János Kollár, and Shigefumi Mori: Birational geometry of algebraic varieties, Cambridge University Press 1998.
