= Ralf J. Spatzier =

American mathematician

Ralf Jürgen Spatzier
- Education: University of Warwick (Ph.D.)
- Scientific career
- Fields: Mathematics
- Workplaces: University of Michigan (1990–); Stony Brook University
- Thesis: Dynamical Properties of Algebraic Systems - a Study in Closed (1983)
- Doctoral advisor: Caroline Series; Anatole Katok

Ralf Jürgen Spatzier is a British American mathematician specialising in differential geometry, dynamical systems, and ergodic theory.

Spatzier received his Ph.D. in mathematics from the University of Warwick in 1983 under the joint supervision of Caroline Series and Anatole Katok and joined Stony Brook University as an assistant professor. In 1990 he moved to the University of Michigan where he is now a full professor. He is a fellow of the American Mathematical Society.
