= Murray H. Protter =

American mathematician (1918–2008)

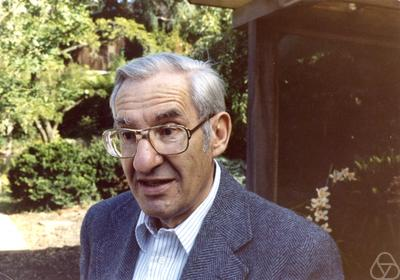
- Murray Protter in 1982 (photo by George Bergman)
- Born: February 13, 1918; Brooklyn, New York, U.S.
- Died: May 1, 2008 (aged 90); Berkeley, California, U.S.
- Education: Brown University; University of Michigan
- Scientific career
- Fields: Mathematics
- Workplaces: University of California, Berkeley
- Doctoral advisor: Lipman Bers
- Doctoral students: Amy Cohen-Corwin

Murray Harold Protter (February 13, 1918 – May 1, 2008) was an American mathematician and educator, known for his contributions to the theory of partial differential equations, as well as his well-selling textbooks in Calculus.

Protter earned a M.Sc. in mathematics at University of Michigan (1937) and a Ph.D. at Brown University with the thesis Generalized Spherical Harmonics advised by Lipman Bers (1946). During the World War II era, he studied the aeroelasticity and flutter of military air planes at the Vought aircraft company in Stratford, Connecticut (1943–45). After his graduation, he worked as an assistant professor at Syracuse University (1947–51), was a researcher at Institute for Advanced Study in Princeton (1951–53) and at University of California at Berkeley (1953–88) where he also was the chairman (1962–65). He also was the Miller Research Professor (1959, 1967) and executive director of the Miller Institute for Basic Research in Science (1981–83). He was the father of operations researcher Philip Protter.

Protter developed "self-paced" learning of mathematics. He was a long-time member (from 1941 onward) of the American Mathematical Society, serving as the treasurer (1968–72) and the editor of the book review column.

== Students ==
- Amy Cohen-Corwin

== Books ==
- Calculus with Analytic Geometry: A first Course (1964). With Charles B. Morrey, Jr.
- Intermediate Calculus (1971, 1985). With Charles B. Morrey, Jr.
- A First Course in Real Analysis (1976, 1991). With Charles B. Morrey, Jr.
- Basic Elements of Real Analysis (1998).
- Maximum Principles in Differential Equations (1967, 1999). With Hans Weinberger
