= Lesley Sibner =

American mathematician

- Born: August 13, 1934; New York City
- Died: September 11, 2013 (aged 79)
- Education: New York University
- Awards: Fulbright Scholar; Noether Lecturer; Bunting Scholar
- Scientific career
- Fields: Mathematics
- Workplaces: Polytechnic Institute of New York University
- Doctoral advisor: Lipman Bers; Cathleen Morawetz

Lesley Millman Sibner (August 13, 1934 – September 11, 2013) was an American mathematician and professor of mathematics at Polytechnic Institute of New York University. She earned her Bachelors at City College CUNY in Mathematics. She completed her doctorate at Courant Institute NYU in 1964 under the joint supervision of Lipman Bers and Cathleen Morawetz. Her thesis concerned partial differential equations of mixed-type.

== Research career ==
In 1964, Lesley Sibner became an instructor at Stanford University for two years. She was a Fulbright Scholar at the Institut Henri Poincaré in Paris the following year. At this time, in addition to solo work on the Tricomi equation and compressible flows, she began working with her husband Robert Sibner on a problem suggested by Lipman Bers: do there exists compressible flows on a Riemann surface? As part of her work in this direction, she studied differential geometry and Hodge theory eventually proving a nonlinear Hodge–DeRham theorem with Robert Sibner based on a physical interpretation of one-dimensional harmonic forms on closed manifolds. The techniques are related to her prior work on compressible flows. They kept working together on related problems and applications of this important work for many years.

In 1967 she joined the faculty at Polytechnic University in Brooklyn, New York. In 1969 she proved the Morse index theorem for degenerate elliptic operators by extending classical Sturm–Liouville theory.

In 1971-1972 she spent a year at the Institute for Advanced Study where she met Michael Atiyah and Raoul Bott. She realized she could use her knowledge of analysis to solve geometric problems related to the Atiyah–Bott fixed-point theorem. In 1974, Lesley and Robert Sibner produced a constructive proof of the Riemann–Roch theorem.

Karen Uhlenbeck suggested that Lesley Sibner work on Yang-Mills equation. In 1979-1980 she visited Harvard University where she learned gauge field theory from Clifford Taubes. This lead results about point singularities in the Yang-Mills equation and the Yang–Mills–Higgs equations. Her interest in singularities soon brought her deeper into geometry, leading to a classification of singular connections and to a condition for removing two-dimensional singularities in work with Robert Sibner.

Realizing that instantons could under certain circumstances be viewed as monopoles, the Sibners and Uhlenbeck constructed non-minimal unstable critical points of the Yang-Mills functional over the four-sphere in 1989. She was invited to present this work at the Geometry Festival. She was a Bunting Scholar at the Radcliffe Institute for Advanced Study in 1991. For the subsequent decades, Lesley Sibner focussed on gauge theory and gravitational instantons. Although the research sounds very physical, in fact throughout her career, Lesley Sibner applied physical intuition to prove important geometric and topological theorems.

In 2012 she became a fellow of the American Mathematical Society.

== Selected articles ==
- Sibner, L. M. (1968). "A remark on the question of uniqueness for the Tricomi problem". Proceedings of the American Mathematical Society. 19 (3): 541–543. doi:10.2307/2035829. JSTOR 2035829.
- Sibner, L. M. (1970) [1969]. "A generalization of the Morse index theorem to a class of degenerate elliptic operators". Journal of Mathematics and Mechanics. 19: 37–40. doi:10.1512/iumj.1970.19.19004.
- Sibner, L. M.; Sibner, R. J. (1970). "A non-linear Hodge-de-Rham theorem". Acta Mathematica. 125: 57–73. doi:10.1007/bf02392330.
- Sibner, L. M.; Sibner, R. J. (1974). "A constructive proof of the Riemann-Roch theorem for curves". Contributions to analysis (a collection of papers dedicated to Lipman Bers). New York: Academic Press. pp. 401–405.
- Sibner, L. M.; Sibner, R. J. (1979). "Nonlinear Hodge theory: applications". Advances in Mathematics. 31 (1): 1–15. doi:10.1016/0001-8708(79)90016-1.
- Sibner, L. M. (1985). "The isolated point singularity problem for the coupled Yang–Mills equations in higher dimensions". Mathematische Annalen. 271 (1): 125–131. doi:10.1007/bf01455801. S2CID 122224439.
- Sibner, L. M. (1986). "On removable point singularities of coupled Yang–Mills fields". Nonlinear functional analysis and its applications, Part 2 (Berkeley, Calif., 1983). Proceedings of Symposia in Pure Mathematics. Vol. 45. Providence, RI: American Mathematical Society. pp. 371–375..
- Sibner, L. M.; Sibner, R. J. (1992). "Classification of singular Sobolev connections by their holonomy". Communications in Mathematical Physics. 144 (2): 337–350. Bibcode:1992CMaPh.144..337S. doi:10.1007/bf02101096. S2CID 121855408.
- Sibner, L. M.; Sibner, R. J.; Uhlenbeck, K. (1989). "Solutions to Yang-Mills equations that are not self-dual". Proceedings of the National Academy of Sciences. 86 (22): 8610–8613. Bibcode:1989PNAS...86.8610S. doi:10.1073/pnas.86.22.8610. PMC 298336. PMID 16594082.
- Sibner, L. M.; Sibner, R. J. (1992). "Classification of singular Sobolev connections by their holonomy". Communications in Mathematical Physics. 144 (2): 337–350. Bibcode:1992CMaPh.144..337S. doi:10.1007/bf02101096. S2CID 121855408.
