= Herbert Morawetz =

Czech-American chemist and professor (1915–2017)

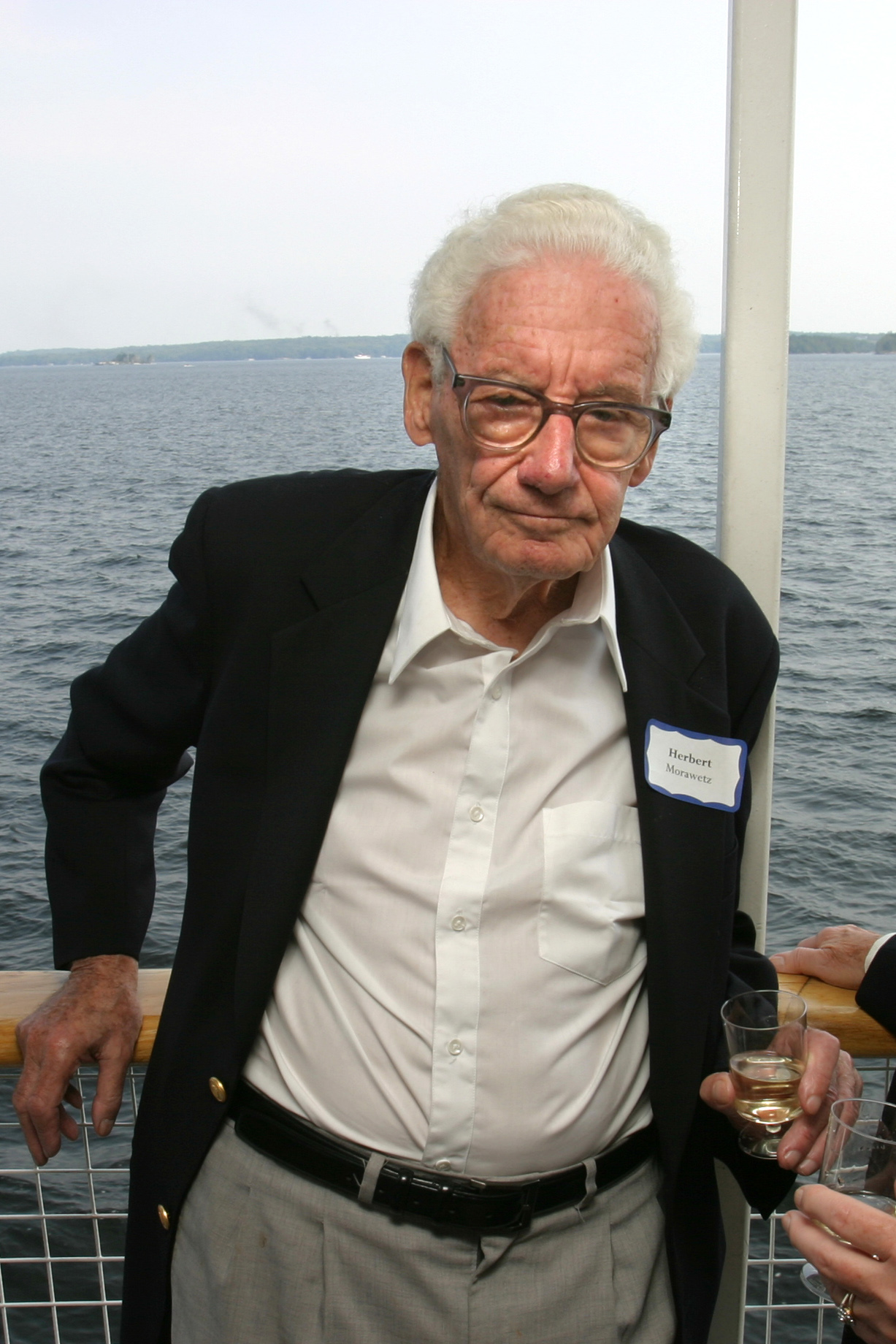
- Born: October 16, 1915; Prague, Czechoslovakia
- Died: October 29, 2017 (aged 102); New York City, U.S.
- Occupation: Chemist
- Children: 4

Herbert Morawetz (October 16, 1915 – October 29, 2017) was a Czech-American chemical engineer. He was a professor of chemistry at Polytechnic Institute of Brooklyn (New York University). His work focused on polymer chemistry and macromolecules. He published two books: Macromolecules in Solution and Polymers and The Origins and Growth of a Science, both by Wiley.

== Personal life ==
Herbert's wife Cathleen Synge Morawetz was a prolific mathematician at NYU. His sister Sonja Morawetz Sinclair revealed in 2017 she was a WW2 codebreaker after seven decades of secrecy by Bletchley Park Signals Intelligence. He helped organize the defection of Mikhail Baryshnikov from the Soviet Union in 1974. His brother, Oskar Morawetz was a Canadian composer. His brother John Morawetz was a Canadian businessman.
