= Jane Piore Gilman =

American mathematician

Jane Piore Gilman (born 1945) is an American mathematician, a distinguished professor of mathematics at Rutgers University. Her research concerns topology and group theory.

== Education and career ==
Gilman is one of three children of physicist Emanuel R. Piore. She did her undergraduate studies at the University of Chicago, graduating in 1965, and received her Ph.D. from Columbia University in 1971. Her thesis, supervised by Lipman Bers, was entitled Relative Modular Groups in Teichmüller Spaces. She worked for a year as an instructor at Stony Brook University before joining Rutgers in 1972.

== Books ==
Gilman is the author of a monograph on the problem of testing whether pairs of elements of PSL(2,R) (the group of orientation-preserving isometries of the hyperbolic plane) generate a Fuchsian group (a discrete subgroup of PSL(2,R)). It is Two-generator Discrete Subgroups of PSL(2, R) (Memoirs of the American Mathematical Society 117, 1995). With Irwin Kra and Rubí E. Rodríguez she is the co-author of a graduate-level textbook on complex analysis, Complex Analysis: In the Spirit of Lipman Bers (Graduate Texts in Mathematics 245, Springer, 2007; 2nd ed., 2013).

== Recognition ==
In 2014, she was elected as a Fellow of the American Mathematical Society "for contributions to topology and group theory, and for service to her department and the larger community."
