= Density theorem for Kleinian groups =

In the mathematical theory of Kleinian groups, the density conjecture of Lipman Bers, Dennis Sullivan, and William Thurston, later proved independently by Namazi & Souto (2012) and Ohshika (2011), states that every finitely generated Kleinian group is an algebraic limit of geometrically finite Kleinian groups.

== History ==
Bers (1970) suggested the Bers density conjecture, that singly degenerate Kleinian surface groups are on the boundary of a Bers slice. This was proved by Bromberg (2007) for Kleinian surface groups with no parabolic elements. A more general version of Bers's conjecture due to Sullivan and Thurston in the late 1970s and early 1980s states that every finitely generated Kleinian group is an algebraic limit of geometrically finite Kleinian groups. Brock & Bromberg (2004) proved this for freely indecomposable Kleinian groups without parabolic elements. The density conjecture was finally proved using the tameness theorem and the ending lamination theorem by Namazi & Souto (2012) and Ohshika (2011).
