= Amy Cohen-Corwin =

American mathematician

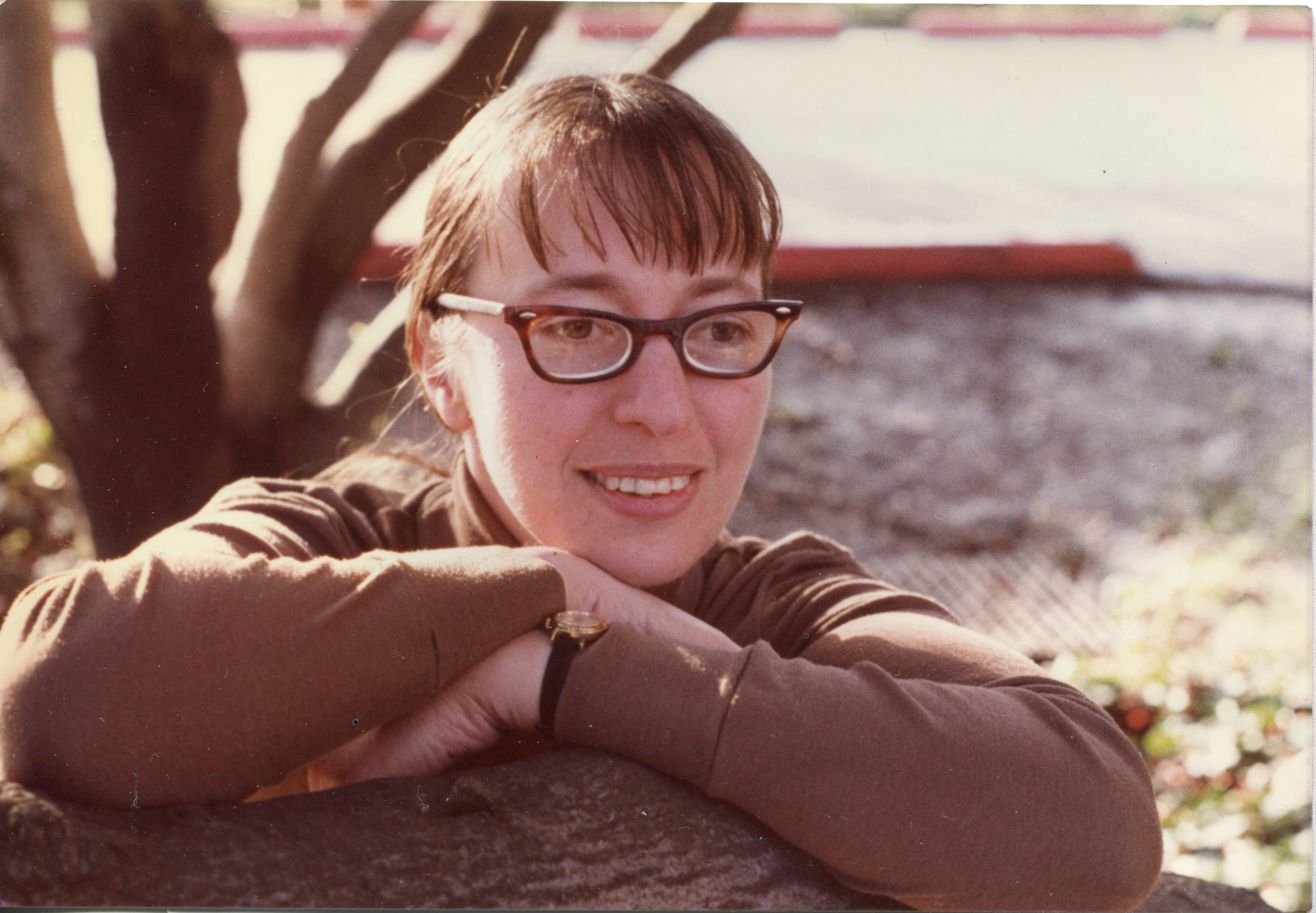
Cohen-Corwin in 1979

Amy Cohen-Corwin (formerly known as Amy C. Murray) is a professor emerita of mathematics at Rutgers University, and former Dean of University College at Rutgers University. In 2006, she was named Fellow of the American Association for the Advancement of Science.

Cohen-Corwin is especially interested in the Korteweg–de Vries equation, cubic Schrödinger equation on the line, and improving undergraduate education, especially for future teachers. She worked on Project SEED whilst at the University of California, Berkeley in 1970 which fueled her interest in Mathematics education.

Cohen-Corwin has held numerous organizational positions, including Co-organizer for the AIM (American Institute of Mathematics) and NSF (National Science Foundation)-sponsored workshop "Finding and Keeping Graduate Students in the Mathematical Sciences."

== Awards ==
- Louise Hay Award for Contributions to Mathematics Education, Joint Mathematics Meeting, Association for Women in Mathematics - 2013
- Fellow, American Association for the Advancement of Science, elected 2006
- Fellow, Association for Women in Mathematics, 2019

== Education ==
- Ph.D., 1970, Mathematics, University of California at Berkeley, under the supervision of Murray H. Protter
- M.S., 1966, Mathematics, University of California at Berkeley
- A.B., 1964, Mathematics, Harvard University (Radcliffe College)
