= Enrico Arbarello =

Italian mathematician (born 1945)

- Born: 1945 (age 80–81); Rome
- Education: Columbia University
- Scientific career
- Fields: Mathematics
- Workplaces: University of Rome; Scuola Normale Superiore di Pisa
- Doctoral advisor: Lipman Bers; Herbert Clemens

Enrico Arbarello is an Italian mathematician who is an expert in algebraic geometry.

== Career ==
He earned a Ph.D. at Columbia University in New York in 1973. He was a visiting scholar at the Institute for Advanced Study from 1993 to 1994. He is now a Mathematics Professor at Sapienza University of Rome. In 2012 he became a fellow of the American Mathematical Society.
