= Victor Bers =

American philologist

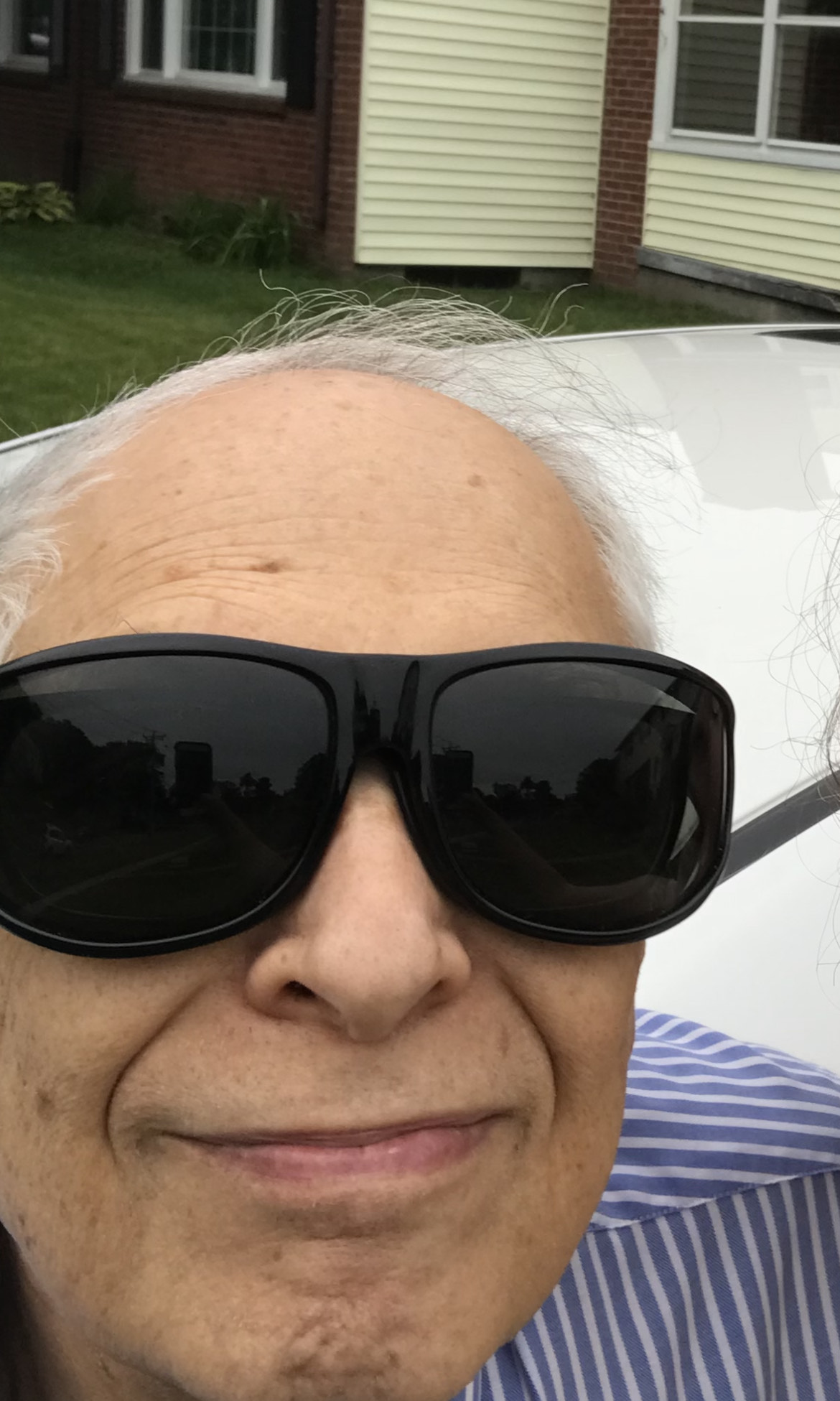
- Born: August 30, 1944 (age 81); Providence, Rhode Island, U.S.
- Education: University of Chicago (AB); New College, Oxford (BA); Harvard University (PhD)
- Occupations: Philologist; classicist; professor
- Years active: 1972–2018
- Spouse: Susan Adler (m. 1966)
- Father: Lipman Bers

Victor Bers (born August 30, 1944) is an American philologist and classicist. He is a professor emeritus of classics at Yale University, where he taught since 1972 before retiring in 2018. Prior to retiring, he served as a Director of the American Philological Association (now the Society for Classical Studies).

== Biography ==
=== Early life and education ===
Bers was born on August 30, 1944, in Providence, Rhode Island. He is the son of the mathematician Lipman Bers, who created the theory of pseudoanalytic functions.

Bers was educated at Albert Leonard Junior High School and New Rochelle High School. He matriculated at the University of Chicago, where he would graduate with a bachelor's degree with distinction. Afterwards, he attained a Woodrow Wilson Fellowship to study at New College, Oxford, where he would obtain a second degree. In 1972, he completed studies for his Doctor of Philosophy at Harvard University. His dissertation was entitled "Enallage and Greek Style." That same year, he joined the faculty of Yale University.

=== Career ===
In 1975, Bers was appointed a fellow at Yale. He would spend the majority of his career at the university, becoming a full-time professor in 1989. In 1999, he was named a Director of the American Philological Association.

== Publications ==
=== Books ===
- Bers, Victor (2008). Genos Dikanikon: Amateur and Professional Speech in the Courtrooms of Classical Athens. Washington, D.C.: Center for Hellenic Studies. ISBN 978-0674032033.
- Bers, Victor (1997). Speech in speech: Studies in Incorporated Oratio Recta in Attic Drama and Oratory. Rowman & Littlefield. ISBN 9780847684502.
- Bers, Victor (1984). Greek Poetic Syntax in the Classical Age. New Haven, CT: Yale University Press. ISBN 9780300028126.
