= Universal Teichmüller space =

Concept in mathematical complex analysis

In mathematical complex analysis, universal Teichmüller space T(1) is a Teichmüller space containing the Teichmüller space T(G) of every Fuchsian group G. It was introduced by Bers (1965) as the set of boundary values of quasiconformal maps of the upper half-plane that fix 0, 1, and ∞.
