= Bernard Maskit =

American mathematician

- Education: New York University (PhD)
- Occupation: Mathematician
- Known for: Expertise in Kleinian groups

Bernard (Bernie) Maskit (27 May 1935 – 15 March 2024) was an American mathematician who worked on Kleinian groups, low dimensional geometry and topology, and related topics.

== Life and work ==
Maskit studied for both his bachelors and doctoral degrees at New York University, earning his Ph.D. in 1964 under the supervision of Lipman Bers, with the thesis On Klein's Combination Theorem. After postdoctoral studies at the Institute for Advanced Study, he held an assistant professorship at the Massachusetts Institute of Technology from 1965 to 1972. He then moved to the mathematics department at Stony Brook University, where he retired in 2008 and was then a professor emeritus until his death. In 2012, he became one of the inaugural fellows of the American Mathematical Society.

Maskit's main area of mathematical expertise was the study of Kleinian groups acting on low dimensional hyperbolic spaces, where he made fundamental contributions. His works include the planarity theorem, the significant development of the Klein-Maskit combination theorems, the study of Schottky groups including their characterization, and the Poincare polyhedron theorem. Of particular note is the Maskit slice of Teichmueller space. He is the author of the book Kleinian Groups (Grundlehren der Mathematischen Wissenschaften 287, Springer-Verlag, 1988) and gave an invited talk about Kleinian groups at the 1974 International Congress of Mathematicians.
