= Geometric finiteness =

In geometry, a group of isometries of hyperbolic space is called geometrically finite if it has a well-behaved fundamental domain. A hyperbolic manifold is called geometrically finite if it can be described in terms of geometrically finite groups.

== Geometrically finite polyhedra ==
A convex polyhedron C in hyperbolic space is called geometrically finite if its closure C̅ in the conformal compactification of hyperbolic space has the following property:

- For each point x in C̅, there is a neighborhood U of x such that all faces of C̅ meeting U also pass through x (Ratcliffe 1994, 12.4).

For example, every polyhedron with a finite number of faces is geometrically finite. In hyperbolic space of dimension at most 2, every geometrically finite polyhedron has a finite number of sides, but there are geometrically finite polyhedra in dimensions 3 and above with infinitely many sides. For example, in Euclidean space R^{n} of dimension n≥2 there is a polyhedron P with an infinite number of sides. The upper half plane model of n+1 dimensional hyperbolic space in R^{n+1} projects to R^{n}, and the inverse image of P under this projection is a geometrically finite polyhedron with an infinite number of sides.

A geometrically finite polyhedron has only a finite number of cusps, and all but finitely many sides meet one of the cusps.

== Geometrically finite groups ==
A discrete group G of isometries of hyperbolic space is called geometrically finite if it has a fundamental domain C that is convex, geometrically finite, and exact (every face is the intersection of C and gC for some g ∈ G) (Ratcliffe 1994, 12.4).

In hyperbolic spaces of dimension at most 3, every exact, convex, fundamental polyhedron for a geometrically finite group has only a finite number of sides, but in dimensions 4 and above there are examples with an infinite number of sides (Ratcliffe 1994, theorem 12.4.6).

In hyperbolic spaces of dimension at most 2, finitely generated discrete groups are geometrically finite, but Greenberg (1966) showed that there are examples of finitely generated discrete groups in dimension 3 that are not geometrically finite.

== Geometrically finite manifolds ==
A hyperbolic manifold is called geometrically finite if it has a finite number of components, each of which is the quotient of hyperbolic space by a geometrically finite discrete group of isometries (Ratcliffe 1994, 12.7).

== See also ==
- Density theorem for Kleinian groups
