= Cathleen Synge Morawetz =

Canadian mathematician (1923–2017)

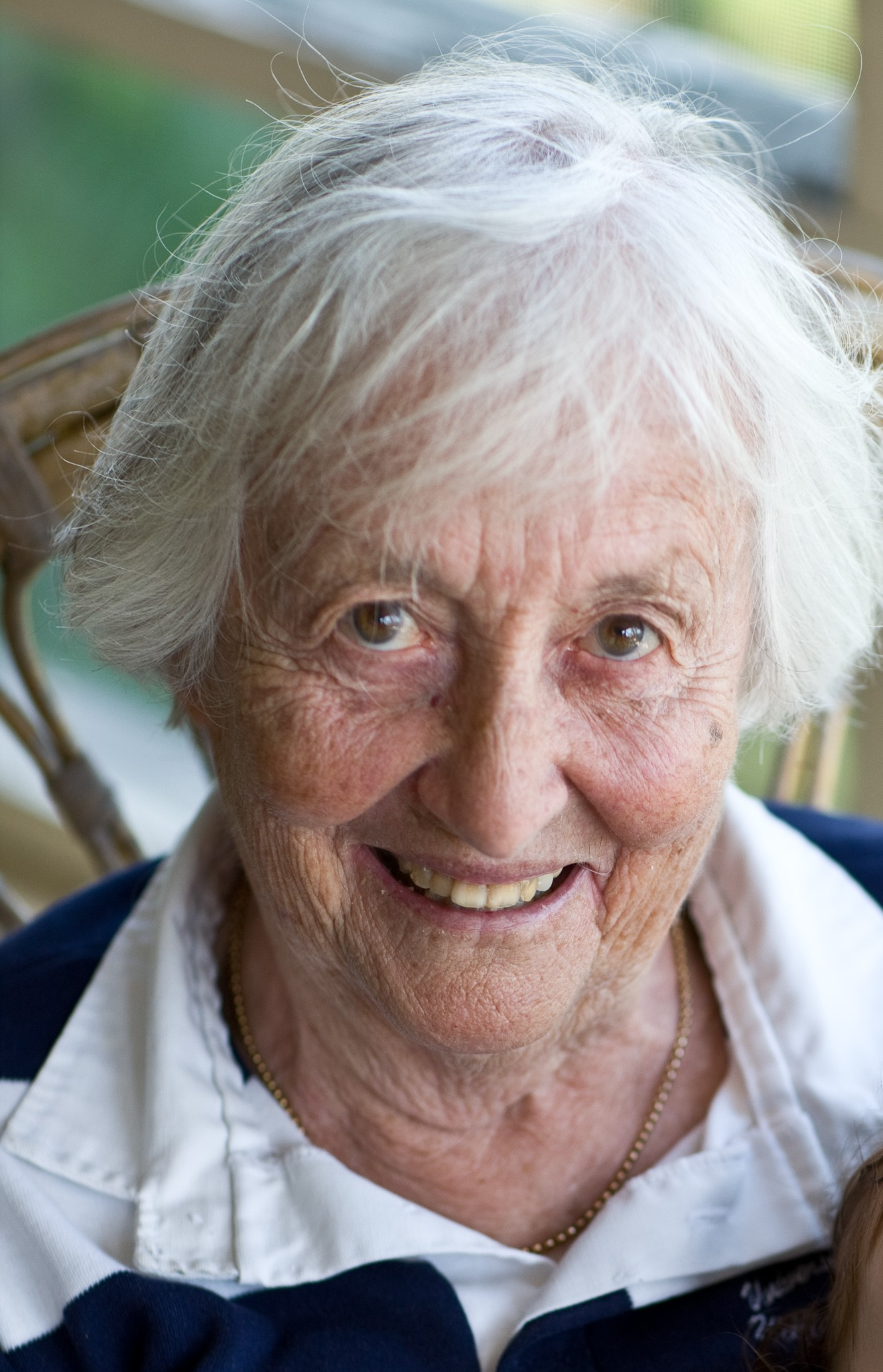
- Born: May 5, 1923; Toronto, Ontario, Canada
- Died: August 8, 2017 (aged 94); New York City, New York, U.S.
- Education: New York University; University of Toronto
- Known for: partial differential equations of mixed type, aerodynamics, supersonic flows, shock waves
- Spouse: Herbert Morawetz (m. 1945)
- Awards: Lester R. Ford Award (1981); Jeffery–Williams Prize (1984); National Medal of Science (1998); Leroy P. Steele Prize (2004); Birkhoff Prize (2006)
- Scientific career
- Fields: Mathematics
- Workplaces: New York University
- Doctoral advisor: Kurt Otto Friedrichs

Cathleen Synge Morawetz (May 5, 1923 – August 8, 2017) was a Canadian mathematician who spent much of her career in the United States. Morawetz's research was mainly in the study of the partial differential equations governing fluid flow, particularly those of mixed type occurring in transonic flow. She was professor emerita at the Courant Institute of Mathematical Sciences at the New York University, where she had also served as director from 1984 to 1988. She was president of the American Mathematical Society from 1995 to 1996. She was awarded the National Medal of Science in 1998.

== Childhood ==
Morawetz's father, John Lighton Synge, nephew of John Millington Synge, was an Irish mathematician, specializing in the geometry of general relativity. Her mother also studied mathematics for a time. Her uncle was Edward Hutchinson Synge who is credited as the inventor of the Near-field scanning optical microscope and very large astronomical telescopes, based on multiple mirrors.

Her childhood was split between Ireland and Canada. Both her parents were supportive of her interest in mathematics and science, and it was a woman mathematician, Cecilia Krieger, who had been a family friend for many years and later encouraged Morawetz to pursue a PhD in mathematics. Morawetz said her father was influential in stimulating her interest in mathematics, but he wondered whether her studying mathematics would be wise (suggesting they might fight like the Bernoulli brothers).

== Education ==
A 1945 graduate of the University of Toronto, she married Herbert Morawetz, a chemist, on October 28, 1945. She received her master's degree in 1946 at the Massachusetts Institute of Technology. Morawetz got a job at New York University where she edited Supersonic Flow and Shock Waves by Richard Courant and Kurt Otto Friedrichs. She earned her Ph.D. in 1951 at New York University, with a thesis on the stability of a spherical implosion, under the supervision of Kurt Otto Friedrichs. Her thesis was entitled Contracting Spherical Shocks Treated by a Perturbation Method.

== Career ==
After earning her doctorate, she spent a year as a research associate at MIT before returning to work as a research associate at the Courant Institute of Mathematical Sciences at NYU, for five more years. During this time she had no teaching requirements and could focus purely on research. She published work on a variety of topics in applied mathematics including viscosity, compressible fluids and transonic flows. Even if an aircraft remains subsonic, the air flowing around the wing can reach supersonic velocity. The mix of air at supersonic and subsonic velocity creates shock waves that can slow the airplane.

Turning to the mathematics of transonic flow, she showed that specially designed shockless airfoils could not, in fact, prevent shocks. Shocks developed in response to even small perturbations, such as a gust of wind or an imperfection in a wing. This discovery opened up the problem of developing a theory for a flow with shocks. Subsequently, the shocks she predicted mathematically now have been observed in experiments as air flows around the wing of a plane.

In 1957, she became an assistant professor at Courant. At this point she began to work more closely with her colleagues publishing important joint papers with Peter Lax and Ralph Phillips on the decay of solutions to the wave equation around a star shaped obstacle. She continued with important solo work on the wave equation and transonic flow around a profile until she was promoted to full professor by 1965.

At this point her research expanded to a variety of problems including papers on the Tricomi equation and the nonrelativistic wave equation, including questions of decay and scattering. Her first doctoral student, Lesley Sibner, was graduated in 1964. In the 1970s, she worked on questions of scattering theory and the nonlinear wave equation. She proved what is now known as the Morawetz Inequality. She died on August 8, 2017, in New York City.

== Honors ==
In 1980, Morawetz won a Lester R. Ford Award. In 1981, she became the first woman to deliver the Gibbs Lecture of The American Mathematical Society, and in 1982, presented an Invited Address at a meeting of the Society for Industrial and Applied Mathematics. She received honorary degrees from Eastern Michigan University in 1980, Brown University, and Smith College in 1982, and Princeton in 1990. In 1983 and in 1988, she was selected as a Noether Lecturer. She was elected to the American Academy of Arts and Sciences in 1984. She was named Outstanding Woman Scientist for 1993 by the Association for Women in Science. In 1995, she became the second woman elected to the office of president of the American Mathematical Society.

In 1996, she was awarded an honorary ScD degree by Trinity College Dublin, where her father JL Synge had been a student and later a faculty member. That same year, she was elected to the American Philosophical Society. In 1998, she was awarded the National Medal of Science; she was the first woman to receive the medal for work in mathematics. In 2004, she received the Leroy P. Steele Prize for Lifetime Achievement. In 2006, she won the George David Birkhoff Prize in Applied Mathematics. In 2012, she became a fellow of the American Mathematical Society.

Morawetz was a member of the National Academy of Sciences and was the first woman to belong to the Applied Mathematics Section of that organization.

== Publications ==
- Morawetz, Cathleen (10 July 1956). "Note on a Maximum Principle and a Uniqueness Theorem for an Elliptic-Hyperbolic Equation". Proceedings of the Royal Society of London, Series A. 236 (1204): 141–144. Bibcode:1956RSPSA.236..141M. doi:10.1098/rspa.1956.0119. JSTOR 99873. S2CID 120556787.
- —— (1956). "On the non-existence of continuous transonic flows past profiles I". Communications on Pure and Applied Mathematics. 9 (1): 45–68. doi:10.1002/cpa.3160090104.
- —— (10 September 1968). "Time Decay for the Nonlinear Klein-Gordon Equation". Proceedings of the Royal Society of London, Series A. 306 (1486): 291–296. Bibcode:1968RSPSA.306..291M. doi:10.1098/rspa.1968.0151. JSTOR 2416107. S2CID 123634895.
- —— (1972). "On the Modes of Decay for the Wave Equation in the Exterior of a Reflecting Body". Proceedings of the Royal Irish Academy, Section A. 72: 113–120. JSTOR 20488719.
- —— (1979). "Nonlinear conservation equations". The American Mathematical Monthly. 86 (4): 284–287. doi:10.2307/2320747. JSTOR 2320747.
- —— (1978). "Geometrical Optics and the Singing of Whales". The American Mathematical Monthly. 85 (7): 548–554. doi:10.2307/2320862. JSTOR 2320862.
- —— (1982). "The mathematical approach to the sonic barrier". Bulletin of the American Mathematical Society. New Series. 6 (2): 127–145. doi:10.1090/s0273-0979-1982-14965-5. MR 0640941.
- Morawetz, Cathleen; Kriegsmann, Gregory A. (August 1983). "The Calculations of an Inverse Potential Problem". SIAM Journal on Applied Mathematics. 43 (4): 844–854. doi:10.1137/0143055. JSTOR 2101366.
- Bayliss, Alvin; Li, Yanyan; Morawetz, Cathleen (April 1989). "Scattering by a Potential Using Hyperbolic Methods". Mathematics of Computation. 52 (186): 321–338. doi:10.2307/2008470. JSTOR 2008470.
- —— (November 1992). "Giants". The American Mathematical Monthly. 99 (9): 819–828. doi:10.2307/2324117. JSTOR 2324117.

== Personal life ==
Morawetz lived in Greenwich Village with her husband Herbert Morawetz, a polymer chemist. They had four children, eight grandchildren, and three great grandchildren. Their children are Pegeen Rubinstein, John, Lida Jeck, and Nancy Morawetz (a professor at New York University School of Law who manages its Immigrant Rights Clinic).

Upon being honored by the National Organization for Women for successfully combining career and family, Morawetz quipped, "Maybe I became a mathematician because I was so crummy at housework." She said her current non-mathematical interests are "grandchildren and sailing."

== See also ==
- List of second-generation Mathematicians
