= Simultaneous uniformization theorem =

In mathematics, the simultaneous uniformization theorem, proved by Bers (1960), states that it is possible to simultaneously uniformize two different Riemann surfaces of the same genus using a quasi-Fuchsian group of the first kind.

The quasi-Fuchsian group is essentially uniquely determined by the two Riemann surfaces, so the space of marked quasi-Fuchsian group of the first kind of some fixed genus g can be identified with the product of two copies of Teichmüller space of the same genus.
