= Ahlfors finiteness theorem =

Mathematical theory

In the mathematical theory of Kleinian groups, the Ahlfors finiteness theorem describes the quotient of the domain of discontinuity by a finitely generated Kleinian group. The theorem was proved by Lars Ahlfors, apart from a gap that was filled by Greenberg.

The Ahlfors finiteness theorem states that if Γ is a finitely-generated Kleinian group with region of discontinuity Ω, then Ω/Γ has a finite number of components, each of which is a compact Riemann surface with a finite number of points removed.

== Bers area inequality ==
The Bers area inequality is a quantitative refinement of the Ahlfors finiteness theorem proved by Lipman Bers. It states that if Γ is a non-elementary finitely-generated Kleinian group with N generators and with region of discontinuity Ω, then

Area(Ω/Γ) ≤ 4π(N − 1)

with equality only for Schottky groups. (The area is given by the Poincaré metric in each component.) Moreover, if Ω_{1} is an invariant component then

Area(Ω/Γ) ≤ 2Area(Ω_{1}/Γ)

with equality only for Fuchsian groups of the first kind (so in particular there can be at most two invariant components).
