= Pseudoanalytic function =

Generalization of analytic functions

In mathematics, pseudoanalytic functions are functions introduced by Lipman Bers (1950, 1951, 1953, 1956) that generalize analytic functions and satisfy a weakened form of the Cauchy–Riemann equations.

== Definitions ==
Let $z=x+iy$ and let $\sigma(x,y)=\sigma(z)$ be a real-valued function defined in a bounded domain $D$. If $\sigma>0$ and $\sigma_x$ and $\sigma_y$ are Hölder continuous, then $\sigma$ is admissible in $D$. Further, given a Riemann surface $F$, if $\sigma$ is admissible for some neighborhood at each point of $F$, $\sigma$ is admissible on $F$.

The complex-valued function $f(z)=u(x,y)+iv(x,y)$ is pseudoanalytic with respect to an admissible $\sigma$ at the point $z_0$ if all partial derivatives of $u$ and $v$ exist and satisfy the following conditions:

$$u_x=\sigma(x,y)v_y, \quad u_y=-\sigma(x,y)v_x$$

If $f$ is pseudoanalytic at every point in some domain, then it is pseudoanalytic in that domain.

== Similarities to analytic functions ==
- If $f(z)$ is not the constant $0$, then the zeroes of $f$ are all isolated.
- Therefore, any analytic continuation of $f$ is unique.

== Examples ==
- Complex constants are pseudoanalytic.
- Any linear combination with real coefficients of pseudoanalytic functions is pseudoanalytic.

== See also ==
- Quasiconformal mapping
- Elliptic partial differential equations
- Cauchy-Riemann equations
