= Bers slice =

Mathematics concept

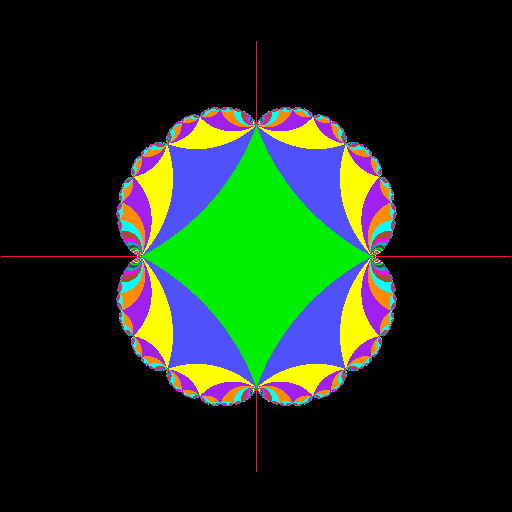
Computer generated image of the bers embedding of a punctured torus’ 2-dimensional Teichmüller space.

In the mathematical theory of Kleinian groups, Bers slices and Maskit slices, named after Lipman Bers and Bernard Maskit, are certain slices through the moduli space of Kleinian groups.

== Bers slices ==
For a quasi-Fuchsian group, the limit set is a Jordan curve whose complement has two components. The quotient of each of these components by the groups is a Riemann surface, so we get a map from marked quasi-Fuchsian groups to pairs of Riemann surfaces, and hence to a product of two copies of Teichmüller space. A Bers slice is a subset of the moduli space of quasi-Fuchsian groups for which one of the two components of this map is a constant function to a single point in its copy of Teichmüller space.

The Bers slice gives an embedding of Teichmüller space into the moduli space of quasi-Fuchsian groups, called the Bers embedding, and the closure of its image is a compactification of Teichmüller space called the Bers compactification.

== Maskit slices ==
A Maskit slice is similar to a Bers slice, except that the group is no longer quasi-Fuchsian, and instead of fixing a point in Teichmüller space one fixes a point in the boundary of Teichmüller space.

The Maskit boundary is a fractal in the Maskit slice separating discrete groups from more chaotic groups.
