= Schottky group =

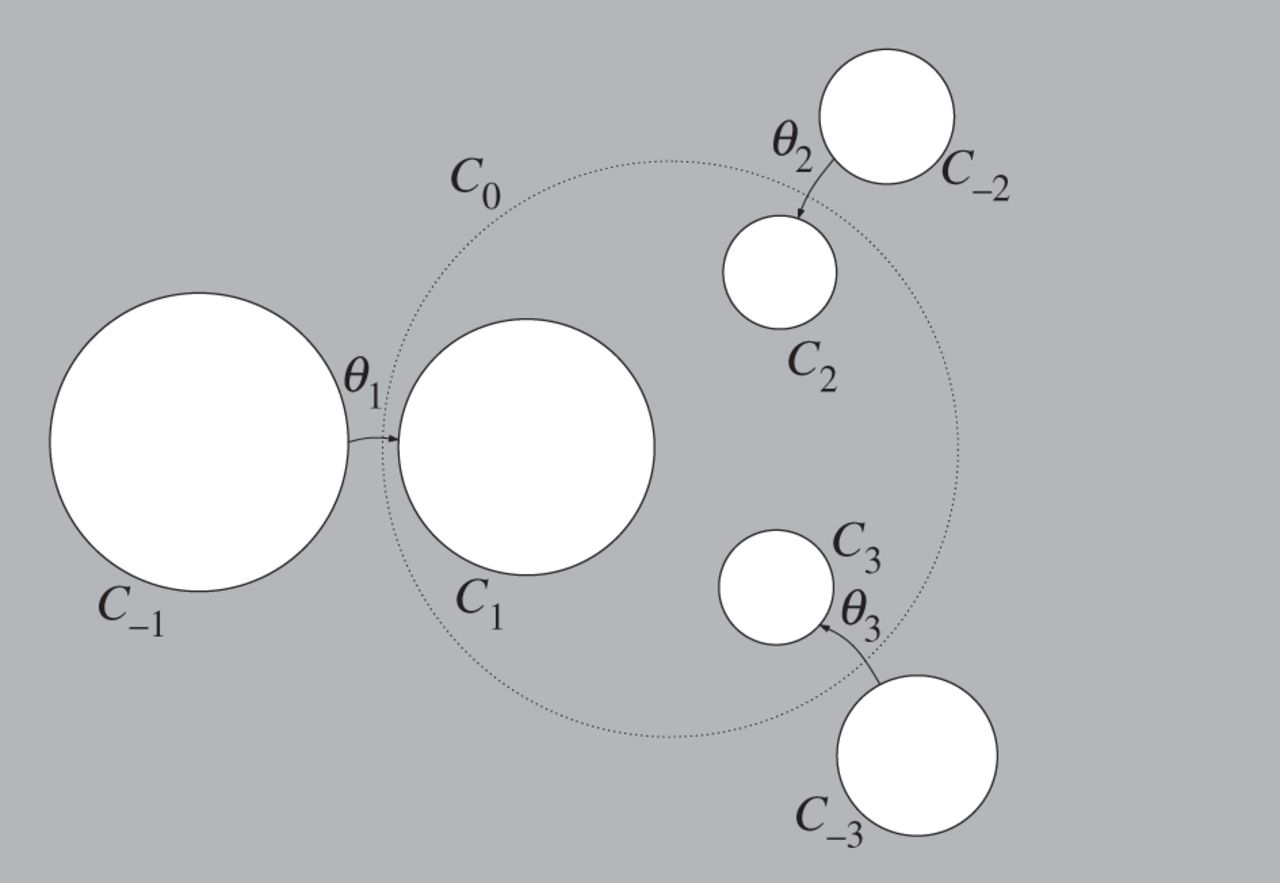
Fundamental domain of a 3-generator Schottky group

In mathematics, a Schottky group is a special sort of Kleinian group, first studied by Friedrich Schottky (1877).

== Definition ==
Fix some point p on the Riemann sphere. Each Jordan curve not passing through p divides the Riemann sphere into two pieces, and we call the piece containing p the "exterior" of the curve, and the other piece its "interior". Suppose there are 2g disjoint Jordan curves A_{1}, B_{1},..., A_{g}, B_{g} in the Riemann sphere with disjoint interiors. If there are Möbius transformations T_{i} taking the outside of A_{i} onto the inside of B_{i}, then the group generated by these transformations is a Kleinian group. A Schottky group is any Kleinian group that can be constructed like this.

== Properties ==
By work of Maskit (1967), a finitely generated Kleinian group is Schottky if and only if it is finitely generated, free, has nonempty domain of discontinuity, and all non-trivial elements are loxodromic.

A fundamental domain for the action of a Schottky group G on its regular points Ω(G) in the Riemann sphere is given by the exterior of the Jordan curves defining it. The corresponding quotient space Ω(G)/G is given by joining up the Jordan curves in pairs, so is a compact Riemann surface of genus g. This is the boundary of the 3-manifold given by taking the quotient (H∪Ω(G))/G of 3-dimensional hyperbolic H space plus the regular set Ω(G) by the Schottky group G, which is a handlebody of genus g. Conversely any compact Riemann surface of genus g can be obtained from some Schottky group of genus g.

== Classical and non-classical Schottky groups ==
A Schottky group is called classical if all the disjoint Jordan curves corresponding to some set of generators can be chosen to be circles. Marden (1974, 1977) gave an indirect and non-constructive proof of the existence of non-classical Schottky groups, and Yamamoto (1991) gave an explicit example of one. It has been shown by Doyle (1988) that all finitely generated classical Schottky groups have limit sets of Hausdorff dimension bounded above strictly by a universal constant less than 2. Conversely, Hou (2010) has proved that there exists a universal lower bound on the Hausdorff dimension of limit sets of all non-classical Schottky groups.

== Limit sets of Schottky groups ==
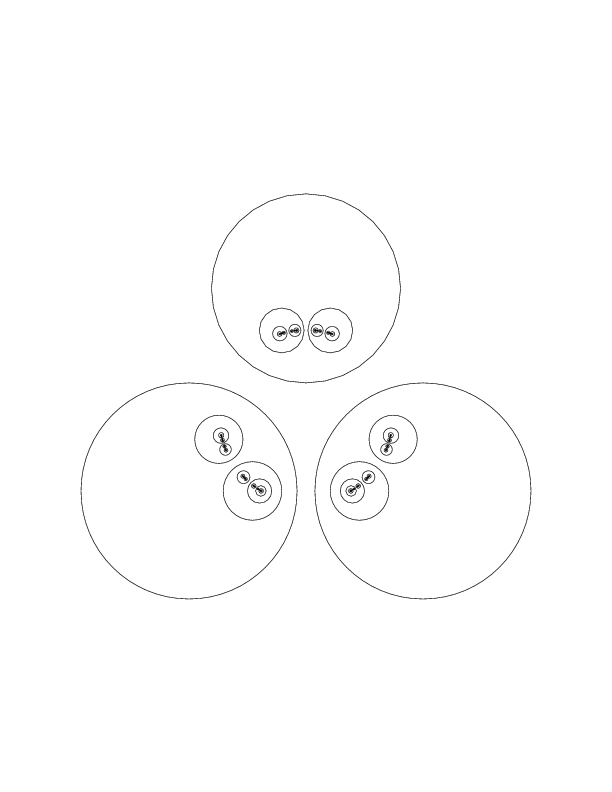
Schottky (Kleinian) group limit set in plane

The limit set of a Schottky group, the complement of Ω(G), always has Lebesgue measure zero, but can have positive d-dimensional Hausdorff measure for d < 2. It is perfect and nowhere dense with positive logarithmic capacity.

The statement on Lebesgue measures follows for classical Schottky groups from the existence of the Poincaré series

$$\displaystyle{P(z)=\sum (c_iz+d_i)^{-4}.}$$

Poincaré showed that the series | c_{i} |^{−4} is summable over the non-identity elements of the group. In fact taking a closed disk in the interior of the fundamental domain, its images under different group elements are disjoint and contained in a fixed disk about 0. So the sums of the areas is finite. By the changes of variables formula, the area is greater than a constant times | c_{i} |^{−4}.

A similar argument implies that the limit set has Lebesgue measure zero. For it is contained in the complement of union of the images of the fundamental region by group elements with word length bounded by n. This is a finite union of circles so has finite area. That area is bounded above by a constant times the contribution to the Poincaré sum of elements of word length n, so decreases to 0.

== Schottky space ==
Schottky space (of some genus g ≥ 2) is the space of marked Schottky groups of genus g, in other words the space of sets of g elements of PSL_{2}(C) that generate a Schottky group, up to equivalence under Möbius transformations (Bers 1975). It is a complex manifold of complex dimension 3g−3. It contains classical Schottky space as the subset corresponding to classical Schottky groups.

Schottky space of genus g is not simply connected in general, but its universal covering space can be identified with Teichmüller space of compact genus g Riemann surfaces.

== See also ==
- Beltrami equation
- Riley slice
