= Kleinian group =

Discrete group of Möbius transformations

In mathematics, a Kleinian group is a discrete subgroup of the group of orientation-preserving isometries of hyperbolic 3-space H^{3}. The latter, identifiable with PSL(2, C), is the quotient group of the 2 by 2 complex matrices of determinant 1 by their center, which consists of the identity matrix and its product by −1. PSL(2, C) has a natural representation as orientation-preserving conformal transformations of the Riemann sphere, and as orientation-preserving conformal transformations of the open unit ball B^{3} in R^{3}. The group of Möbius transformations is also related as the non-orientation-preserving isometry group of H^{3}, PGL(2, C). So, a Kleinian group can be regarded as a discrete subgroup acting on one of these spaces.

== History ==
The theory of general Kleinian groups was founded by Felix Klein and Henri Poincaré, who named them after Felix Klein. The special case of Schottky groups had been studied a few years earlier, in 1877, by Friedrich Schottky.

== Definitions ==
One modern definition of Kleinian group is as a group which acts on the 3-ball $B^3$ as a discrete group of hyperbolic isometries. Hyperbolic 3-space has a natural boundary; in the ball model, this can be identified with the 2-sphere. We call it the sphere at infinity, and denote it by $S^2_\infty$. A hyperbolic isometry extends to a conformal homeomorphism of the sphere at infinity (and conversely, every conformal homeomorphism on the sphere at infinity extends uniquely to a hyperbolic isometry on the ball by Poincaré extension). It is a standard result from complex analysis that conformal homeomorphisms on the Riemann sphere are exactly the Möbius transformations, which can further be identified as elements of the projective linear group PGL(2,C). Thus, a Kleinian group can also be defined as a subgroup Γ of PGL(2,C). Classically, a Kleinian group was required to act properly discontinuously on a non-empty open subset of the Riemann sphere, but modern usage allows any discrete subgroup.

When Γ is isomorphic to the fundamental group $\pi_1$ of a hyperbolic 3-manifold, then the quotient space H^{3}/Γ becomes a Kleinian model of the manifold. Many authors use the terms Kleinian model and Kleinian group interchangeably, letting the one stand for the other.

Discreteness implies points in the interior of hyperbolic 3-space have finite stabilizers, and discrete orbits under the group Γ. On the other hand, the orbit Γp of a point p will typically accumulate on the boundary of the closed ball $\bar{B}^3$.

An Apollonian gasket is an example of a limit set of a Kleinian group

The set of accumulation points of Γp in $S^2_\infty$ is called the limit set of Γ, and usually denoted $\Lambda(\Gamma)$. The complement $\Omega(\Gamma)=S^2_\infty - \Lambda(\Gamma)$ is called the domain of discontinuity or the ordinary set or the regular set. Ahlfors' finiteness theorem implies that if the group is finitely generated then $\Omega(\Gamma)/\Gamma$ is a Riemann surface orbifold of finite type.

The unit ball B^{3} with its conformal structure is the Poincaré model of hyperbolic 3-space. When we think of it metrically, with metric

$$ds^2= \frac{4 \, \left| dx \right|^2 }{\left( 1-|x|^2 \right)^2}$$

it is a model of 3-dimensional hyperbolic space H^{3}. The set of conformal self-maps of B^{3} becomes the set of isometries (i.e. distance-preserving maps) of H^{3} under this identification. Such maps restrict to conformal self-maps of $S^2_\infty$, which are Möbius transformations. There are isomorphisms

$$\operatorname{Mob}(S^2_\infty) \cong \operatorname{Conf}(B^3) \cong \operatorname{Isom}(\mathbf{H}^3).$$

The subgroups of these groups consisting of orientation-preserving transformations are all isomorphic to the projective matrix group: PSL(2,C) via the usual identification of the unit sphere with the complex projective line P^{1}(C).

=== Variations ===
There are some variations of the definition of a Kleinian group: sometimes Kleinian groups are allowed to be subgroups of PSL(2, C).2 (that is, of PSL(2, C) extended by complex conjugations), in other words to have orientation reversing elements, and sometimes they are assumed to be finitely generated, and sometimes they are required to act properly discontinuously on a non-empty open subset of the Riemann sphere.

== Types ==
- A Kleinian group is said to be of finite type if its region of discontinuity has a finite number of orbits of components under the group action, and the quotient of each component by its stabilizer is a compact Riemann surface with finitely many points removed, and the covering is ramified at finitely many points.
- A Kleinian group is called finitely generated if it has a finite number of generators. The Ahlfors finiteness theorem says that such a group is of finite type.
- A Kleinian group Γ has finite covolume if H^{3}/Γ has finite volume. Any Kleinian group of finite covolume is finitely generated.
- A Kleinian group is called geometrically finite if it has a fundamental polyhedron (in hyperbolic 3-space) with finitely many sides. Ahlfors showed that if the limit set is not the whole Riemann sphere then it has measure 0.
- A Kleinian group Γ is called arithmetic if it is commensurable with the group norm 1 elements of an order of quaternion algebra A ramified at all real places over a number field k with exactly one complex place. Arithmetic Kleinian groups have finite covolume.
- A Kleinian group Γ is called cocompact if H^{3}/Γ is compact, or equivalently SL(2, C)/Γ is compact. Cocompact Kleinian groups have finite covolume.
- A Kleinian group is called topologically tame if it is finitely generated and its hyperbolic manifold is homeomorphic to the interior of a compact manifold with boundary.
- A Kleinian group is called geometrically tame if its ends are either geometrically finite or simply degenerate.
- A Kleinian group is said to be of type 1 if the limit set is the whole Riemann sphere, and of type 2 otherwise.

== Examples ==
- The Maskit slice through the moduli space of Kleinian groups

=== Bianchi groups ===
A Bianchi group is a Kleinian group of the form PSL(2, O_{d}), where $\mathcal{O}_d$ is the ring of integers of the imaginary quadratic field $\mathbb{Q}(\sqrt{-d})$ for d a positive square-free integer.

=== Elementary and reducible Kleinian groups ===
A Kleinian group is called elementary if its limit set is finite, in which case the limit set has 0, 1, or 2 points. Examples of elementary Kleinian groups include finite Kleinian groups (with empty limit set) and infinite cyclic Kleinian groups.

A Kleinian group is called reducible if all elements have a common fixed point on the Riemann sphere. Reducible Kleinian groups are elementary, but some elementary finite Kleinian groups are not reducible.

=== Fuchsian groups ===
Any Fuchsian group (a discrete subgroup of PSL(2, R)) is a Kleinian group, and conversely any Kleinian group preserving the real line (in its action on the Riemann sphere) is a Fuchsian group. More generally, every Kleinian group preserving a circle or straight line in the Riemann sphere is conjugate to a Fuchsian group.

=== Koebe groups ===
- A factor of a Kleinian group G is a subgroup H maximal subject to the following properties:
  - H has a simply connected invariant component D
  - A conjugate of an element h of H by a conformal bijection is parabolic or elliptic if and only if h is.
  - Any parabolic element of G fixing a boundary point of D is in H.
- A Kleinian group is called a Koebe group if all its factors are elementary or Fuchsian.

=== Quasi-Fuchsian groups ===
Limit set of a quasi-Fuchsian group

A Kleinian group that preserves a Jordan curve is called a quasi-Fuchsian group. When the Jordan curve is a circle or a straight line these are just conjugate to Fuchsian groups under conformal transformations. Finitely generated quasi-Fuchsian groups are conjugate to Fuchsian groups under quasi-conformal transformations. The limit set is contained in the invariant Jordan curve, and if it is equal to the Jordan curve the group is said to be of the first kind, and otherwise it is said to be of the second kind.

=== Schottky groups ===
Let C_{i} be the boundary circles of a finite collection of disjoint closed disks. The group generated by inversion in each circle has limit set a Cantor set, and the quotient H^{3}/G is a mirror orbifold with underlying space a ball. It is double covered by a handlebody; the corresponding index 2 subgroup is a Kleinian group called a Schottky group.

=== Crystallographic groups ===
Let T be a periodic tessellation of hyperbolic 3-space. The group of symmetries of the tessellation is a Kleinian group.

=== Fundamental groups of hyperbolic 3-manifolds ===
The fundamental group of any oriented hyperbolic 3-manifold is a Kleinian group. There are many examples of these, such as the complement of a figure 8 knot or the Seifert–Weber space. Conversely if a Kleinian group has no nontrivial torsion elements then it is the fundamental group of a hyperbolic 3-manifold.

=== Degenerate Kleinian groups ===
A Kleinian group is called degenerate if it is not elementary and its limit set is simply connected. Such groups can be constructed by taking a suitable limit of quasi-Fuchsian groups such that one of the two components of the regular points contracts down to the empty set; these groups are called singly degenerate. If both components of the regular set contract down to the empty set, then the limit set becomes a space-filling curve and the group is called doubly degenerate. The existence of degenerate Kleinian groups was first shown indirectly by Bers, and the first explicit example was found by Jørgensen. Cannon & Thurston (2007) gave examples of doubly degenerate groups and space-filling curves associated to pseudo-Anosov maps.

== See also ==
- Ahlfors measure conjecture
- Density theorem for Kleinian groups
- Ending lamination theorem
- Tameness theorem (Marden's conjecture)
