= Quasi-Fuchsian group =

In the mathematical theory of Kleinian groups, a quasi-Fuchsian group is a Kleinian group whose limit set is contained in an invariant Jordan curve. If the limit set is equal to the Jordan curve the quasi-Fuchsian group is said to be of type one, and otherwise it is said to be of type two. Some authors use "quasi-Fuchsian group" to mean "quasi-Fuchsian group of type 1", in other words the limit set is the whole Jordan curve. This terminology is incompatible with the use of the terms "type 1" and "type 2" for Kleinian groups: all quasi-Fuchsian groups are Kleinian groups of type 2 (even if they are quasi-Fuchsian groups of type 1), as their limit sets are proper subsets of the Riemann sphere. The special case when the Jordan curve is a circle or line is called a Fuchsian group, named after Lazarus Fuchs by Henri Poincaré.

Finitely generated quasi-Fuchsian groups are conjugate to Fuchsian groups under quasi-conformal transformations.

The space of quasi-Fuchsian groups of the first kind is described by the simultaneous uniformization theorem of Bers.
