= Maximal function =

Type of mathematical function

Maximal functions appear in many forms in harmonic analysis (an area of mathematics). One of the most important of these is the Hardy–Littlewood maximal function. They play an important role in understanding, for example, the differentiability properties of functions, singular integrals and partial differential equations. They often provide a deeper and more simplified approach to understanding problems in these areas than other methods.

== The Hardy–Littlewood maximal function ==
In their original paper, G.H. Hardy and J.E. Littlewood explained their maximal inequality in the language of cricket averages. Given a function f defined on R^{n}, the uncentred Hardy–Littlewood maximal function Mf of f is defined as

$$(Mf)(x) = \sup_{B \ni x} \frac{1}{|B|} \int_B |f|$$

at each x in R^{n}. Here, the supremum is taken over balls B in R^{n} which contain the point x and |B| denotes the measure of B (in this case a multiple of the radius of the ball raised to the power n). One can also study the centred maximal function, where the supremum is taken just over balls B which have centre x. In practice there is little difference between the two.

=== Basic properties ===
The following statements are central to the utility of the Hardy–Littlewood maximal operator.

- (a) For f ∈ L^{p}(R^{n}) (1 ≤ p ≤ ∞), Mf is finite almost everywhere.
- (b) If f ∈ L^{1}(R^{n}), then there exists a c such that, for all α > 0,

$$|\{x \ : \ (Mf)(x) > \alpha\}| \leq \frac{c}{\alpha}\int_{\mathbf{R}^n} |f|.$$

- (c) If f ∈ L^{p}(R^{n}) (1 < p ≤ ∞), then Mf ∈ L^{p}(R^{n}) and

$$\|Mf\|_{L^p} \leq A \|f\|_{L^p},$$

where A depends only on p and c.

Properties (b) is called a weak-type bound of Mf. For an integrable function, it corresponds to the elementary Markov inequality; however, Mf is never integrable, unless f = 0 almost everywhere, so that the proof of the weak bound (b) for Mf requires a less elementary argument from geometric measure theory, such as the Vitali covering lemma. Property (c) says the operator M is bounded on L^{p}(R^{n}); it is clearly true when p = ∞, since we cannot take an average of a bounded function and obtain a value larger than the largest value of the function. Property (c) for all other values of p can then be deduced from these two facts by an interpolation argument.

It is worth noting (c) does not hold for p = 1. This can be easily proved by calculating Mχ, where χ is the characteristic function of the unit ball centred at the origin.

=== Applications ===
The Hardy–Littlewood maximal operator appears in many places but some of its most notable uses are in the proofs of the Lebesgue differentiation theorem and Fatou's theorem and in the theory of singular integral operators.

== Non-tangential maximal functions ==
The non-tangential maximal function takes a function F defined on the upper-half plane

$$\mathbf{R}^{n+1}_+ := \left \{(x,t) \ : \ x \in \mathbf{R}^n, t>0 \right \}$$

and produces a function F* defined on R^{n} via the expression

$$F^*(x) = \sup_{|x-y|<t} |F(y,t)|.$$

Observe that for a fixed x, the set $\{(y,t) \ : \ |x-y|<t\}$ is a cone in $\mathbf{R}^{n+1}_+$ with vertex at (x,0) and axis perpendicular to the boundary of R^{n}. Thus, the non-tangential maximal operator simply takes the supremum of the function F over a cone with vertex at the boundary of R^{n}.

=== Approximations of the identity ===
One particularly important form of functions F in which study of the non-tangential maximal function is important is formed from an approximation to the identity. That is, we fix an integrable smooth function Φ on R^{n} such that

$$\int_{\mathbf{R}^n} \Phi = 1$$

and set

$$\Phi_t(x) =  t^{-n} \Phi(\tfrac{x}{t})$$

for t > 0. Then define

$$F(x,t) = f \ast \Phi_t(x) := \int_{\mathbf{R}^n} f(x-y)\Phi_t(y) \, dy.$$

One can show that

$$\sup_{t>0}|f \ast \Phi_t(x)| \leq (Mf)(x) \int_{\mathbf{R}^n} \Phi$$

and consequently obtain that $f \ast \Phi_t(x)$ converges to f in L^{p}(R^{n}) for all 1 ≤ p < ∞. Such a result can be used to show that the harmonic extension of an L^{p}(R^{n}) function to the upper-half plane converges non-tangentially to that function. More general results can be obtained where the Laplacian is replaced by an elliptic operator via similar techniques.

Moreover, with some appropriate conditions on $\Phi$, one can get that

$$F^*(x) \leq C(Mf)(x)$$.

== The sharp maximal function ==
For a locally integrable function f on R^{n}, the sharp maximal function $f^\sharp$ is defined as

$$f^\sharp(x) = \sup_{x \in B} \frac{1}{|B|} \int_B |f(y) - f_B| \, dy$$

for each x in R^{n}, where the supremum is taken over all balls B and $f_B$ is the integral average of $f$ over the ball $B$.

The sharp function can be used to obtain a point-wise inequality regarding singular integrals. Suppose we have an operator T which is bounded on L^{2}(R^{n}), so we have

$$\|T(f)\|_{L^2} \leq C\|f\|_{L^2},$$

for all smooth and compactly supported f. Suppose also that we can realize T as convolution against a kernel K in the sense that, whenever f and g are smooth and have disjoint support

$$\int g(x) T(f)(x) \, dx = \iint g(x) K(x-y) f(y) \, dy\,dx.$$

Finally we assume a size and smoothness condition on the kernel K:

$$|K(x-y)-K(x)| \leq C \frac{|y|^{\gamma}}{|x|^{n+\gamma}},$$

when $|x| \geq 2|y|$. Then for a fixed r > 1, we have

$$(T(f))^\sharp(x) \leq C(M(|f|^r))^\frac{1}{r}(x)$$

for all x in R^{n}.

== Maximal functions in ergodic theory ==
Let $(X,\mathcal{B},m)$ be a probability space, and T : X → X a measure-preserving endomorphism of X. The maximal function of f ∈ L^{1}(X,m) is

$$f^*(x):=\sup_{n\geq1}\frac{1}{n}\sum_i^{n-1}|f(T^i(x))|.$$

The maximal function of f verifies a weak bound analogous to the Hardy–Littlewood maximal inequality:

$$m\left(\{x\in X\ :\ f^*(x)>\alpha\}\right)\leq\frac{\|f\|_1}{\alpha},$$

that is a restatement of the maximal ergodic theorem.

== Martingale Maximal Function ==
If $\{f_n\}$ is a martingale, we can define the martingale maximal function by $f^*(x) = \sup_n|f_n(x)|$. If $f(x) = \lim_{n\rightarrow\infty}f_n(x)$ exists, many results that hold in the classical case (e.g. boundedness in $L^p, 1<p\le\infty$ and the weak $L^1$ inequality) hold with respect to $f$ and $f^*$.
