= Interpolation theorem =

Interpolation theorem may refer to:

- Craig interpolation in logic
- Marcinkiewicz interpolation theorem about non-linear operators
- Riesz–Thorin interpolation theorem about linear operators
- Polynomial interpolation in analysis
