= Riesz–Thorin theorem =

Theorem on operator interpolation

In mathematical analysis, the Riesz–Thorin theorem, often referred to as the Riesz–Thorin interpolation theorem or the Riesz–Thorin convexity theorem, is a result about interpolation of operators. It is named after Marcel Riesz and his student G. Olof Thorin.

This theorem bounds the norms of linear maps acting between L^{p} spaces. Its usefulness stems from the fact that some of these spaces have rather simpler structure than others. Usually that refers to L^{2} which is a Hilbert space, or to L^{1} and L^{∞}. Therefore one may prove theorems about the more complicated cases by proving them in two simple cases and then using the Riesz–Thorin theorem to pass from the simple cases to the complicated cases. The Marcinkiewicz theorem is similar but applies also to a class of non-linear maps.

== Motivation ==
First we need the following definition:

Definition. Let p_{0}, p_{1} be two numbers such that 1 ≤ p_{0} < p_{1} ≤ ∞. Then for 0 < θ < 1 define p_{θ} by: 1/p_{θ} = (1 − θ)/p_{0} + θ/p_{1}.

By splitting up the function f in L^{p_{θ}} as the product | f | = | f |^{1−θ} | f |^{θ} and applying Hölder's inequality to its p_{θ} power, we obtain the following result, foundational in the study of L^{p}-spaces:

Proposition (log-convexity of L^{p}-norms)—Each f ∈ L^{p_{0}} ∩ L^{p_{1}} satisfies:

$$\|f\|_{p_\theta} \leq \|f\|_{p_0}^{1-\theta}\|f\|_{p_1}^\theta.$$	1

This result, whose name derives from the convexity of the map 1/p ↦ log || f ||_{p} on [0, ∞], implies that L^{p_{0}} ∩ L^{p_{1}} ⊂ L^{p_{θ}}.

On the other hand, if we take the layer-cake decomposition f = f 1_{{| f |>1}} + f 1_{{| f |≤1}}, then we see that f 1_{{| f |>1}} ∈ L^{p_{0}} and f 1_{{| f |≤1}} ∈ L^{p_{1}}, whence we obtain the following result:

Proposition—Each f in L^{p_{θ}} can be written as a sum: f = g + h, where g ∈ L^{p_{0}} and h ∈ L^{p_{1}}.

In particular, the above result implies that L^{p_{θ}} is included in L^{p_{0}} + L^{p_{1}}, the sumset of L^{p_{0}} and L^{p_{1}} in the space of all measurable functions. Therefore, we have the following chain of inclusions:

Corollary—L^{p_{0}} ∩ L^{p_{1}} ⊂ L^{p_{θ}} ⊂ L^{p_{0}} + L^{p_{1}}.

In practice, we often encounter operators defined on the sumset L^{p_{0}} + L^{p_{1}}. For example, the Riemann–Lebesgue lemma shows that the Fourier transform maps L^{1}(R^{d}) boundedly into L^{∞}(R^{d}), and Plancherel's theorem shows that the Fourier transform maps L^{2}(R^{d}) boundedly into itself, hence the Fourier transform $\mathcal{F}$ extends to (L^{1} + L^{2}) (R^{d}) by setting
$$\mathcal{F}(f_1+f_2) = \mathcal{F}_{L^1}(f_1) + \mathcal{F}_{L^2}(f_2)$$
for all f_{1} ∈ L^{1}(R^{d}) and f_{2} ∈ L^{2}(R^{d}). It is therefore natural to investigate the behavior of such operators on the intermediate subspaces L^{p_{θ}}.

To this end, we go back to our example and note that the Fourier transform on the sumset L^{1} + L^{2} was obtained by taking the sum of two instantiations of the same operator, namely
$$\mathcal{F}_{L^1}:L^1(\mathbf{R}^d) \to L^\infty(\mathbf{R}^d),$$
$$\mathcal{F}_{L^2}:L^2(\mathbf{R}^d) \to L^2(\mathbf{R}^d).$$

These really are the same operator, in the sense that they agree on the subspace (L^{1} ∩ L^{2}) (R^{d}). Since the intersection contains simple functions, it is dense in both L^{1}(R^{d}) and L^{2}(R^{d}). Densely defined continuous operators admit unique extensions, and so we are justified in considering $\mathcal{F}_{L^1}$ and $\mathcal{F}_{L^2}$ to be the same.

Therefore, the problem of studying operators on the sumset L^{p_{0}} + L^{p_{1}} essentially reduces to the study of operators that map two natural domain spaces, L^{p_{0}} and L^{p_{1}}, boundedly to two target spaces: L^{q_{0}} and L^{q_{1}}, respectively. Since such operators map the sumset space L^{p_{0}} + L^{p_{1}} to L^{q_{0}} + L^{q_{1}}, it is natural to expect that these operators map the intermediate space L^{p_{θ}} to the corresponding intermediate space L^{q_{θ}}.

== Statement of the theorem ==
There are several ways to state the Riesz–Thorin interpolation theorem; to be consistent with the notations in the previous section, we shall use the sumset formulation.

Riesz–Thorin interpolation theorem—Let (Ω_{1}, Σ_{1}, μ_{1}) and (Ω_{2}, Σ_{2}, μ_{2}) be σ-finite measure spaces. Suppose 1 ≤ p_{0} , q_{0} , p_{1} , q_{1} ≤ ∞, and let T : L^{p_{0}}(μ_{1}) + L^{p_{1}}(μ_{1}) → L^{q_{0}}(μ_{2}) + L^{q_{1}}(μ_{2}) be a linear operator that boundedly maps L^{p_{0}}(μ_{1}) into L^{q_{0}}(μ_{2}) and L^{p_{1}}(μ_{1}) into L^{q_{1}}(μ_{2}). For 0 < θ < 1, let p_{θ}, q_{θ} be defined as above. Then T boundedly maps L^{p_{θ}}(μ_{1}) into L^{q_{θ}}(μ_{2}) and satisfies the operator norm estimate

$$\|T\|_{L^{p_\theta} \to L^{q_\theta}} \leq \|T\|^{1-\theta}_{L^{p_0} \to L^{q_0}} \|T\|^{\theta}_{L^{p_1} \to L^{q_1}}.$$	2

In other words, if T is simultaneously of type (p_{0}, q_{0}) and of type (p_{1}, q_{1}), then T is of type (p_{θ}, q_{θ}) for all 0 < θ < 1. In this manner, the interpolation theorem lends itself to a pictorial description. Indeed, the Riesz diagram of T is the collection of all points (1/p, 1/q) in the unit square [0, 1] × [0, 1] such that T is of type (p, q). The interpolation theorem states that the Riesz diagram of T is a convex set: given two points in the Riesz diagram, the line segment that connects them will also be in the diagram.

The interpolation theorem was originally stated and proved by Marcel Riesz in 1927. The 1927 paper establishes the theorem only for the lower triangle of the Riesz diagram, viz., with the restriction that p_{0} ≤ q_{0} and p_{1} ≤ q_{1}. Olof Thorin extended the interpolation theorem to the entire square, removing the lower-triangle restriction. The proof of Thorin was originally published in 1938 and was subsequently expanded upon in his 1948 thesis.

== Proof ==
We will first prove the result for simple functions and eventually show how the argument can be extended by density to all measurable functions.

=== Simple functions ===
By symmetry, let us assume $p_0 < p_1$ (the case $p_0 = p_1$ trivially follows from (1)). Let $f$ be a simple function, that is
$$f = \sum_{j=1}^m a_j \mathbf{1}_{A_j}$$
for some finite $m\in\mathbb{N}$, $a_j = \left\vert a_j\right\vert\mathrm{e}^{\mathrm{i}\alpha_j} \in \mathbb{C}$ and $A_j\in\Sigma_1$, $j=1,2,\dots,m$. Similarly, let $g$ denote a simple function $\Omega_2 \to \mathbb{C}$, namely
$$g = \sum_{k=1}^n b_k \mathbf{1}_{B_k}$$
for some finite $n\in\mathbb{N}$, $b_k = \left\vert b_k\right\vert\mathrm{e}^{\mathrm{i}\beta_k} \in \mathbb{C}$ and $B_k\in\Sigma_2$, $k=1,2,\dots,n$.

Note that, since we are assuming $\Omega_1$ and $\Omega_2$ to be $\sigma$-finite metric spaces, $f\in L^{r}(\mu_1)$ and $g\in L^r(\mu_2)$ for all $r \in [1, \infty]$. Then, by proper normalization, we can assume $\lVert f\rVert_{p_\theta}= 1$ and $\lVert g\rVert_{q_\theta'}=1$, with $q_\theta' = q_\theta(q_\theta-1)^{-1}$ and with $p_\theta$, $q_\theta$ as defined by the theorem statement.

Next, we define the two complex functions
$$\begin{aligned}
u: \mathbb{C}&\to \mathbb{C}& v: \mathbb{C}&\to \mathbb{C}\\
z &\mapsto u(z)=\frac{1-z}{p_0} + \frac{z}{p_1} &
z &\mapsto v(z)=\frac{1-z}{q_0} + \frac{z}{q_1}.\end{aligned}$$
Note that, for $z=\theta$, $u(\theta) = p_\theta^{-1}$ and $v(\theta) = q_\theta^{-1}$. We then extend $f$ and $g$ to depend on a complex parameter $z$ as follows:
$$\begin{aligned}
f_z &= \sum_{j=1}^m \left\vert a_j\right\vert^{\frac{u(z)}{u(\theta)}} \mathrm{e}^{\mathrm{i}\alpha_j}
\mathbf{1}_{A_j} \\
g_z &= \sum_{k=1}^n \left\vert b_k\right\vert^{\frac{1-v(z)}{1-v(\theta)}} \mathrm{e}^{\mathrm{i}
\beta_k} \mathbf{1}_{B_k}\end{aligned}$$
so that $f_\theta = f$ and $g_\theta = g$. Here, we are implicitly excluding the case $q_0 = q_1 = 1$, which yields $v\equiv 1$: In that case, one can simply take $g_z=g$, independently of $z$, and the following argument will only require minor adaptations.

Let us now introduce the function
$$\Phi(z) = \int_{\Omega_2} (T f_z) g_z \,\mathrm{d}\mu_2
= \sum_{j=1}^m \sum_{k=1}^n \left\vert a_j\right\vert^{\frac{u(z)}{u(\theta)}}
\left\vert b_k\right\vert^{\frac{1-v(z)}{1-v(\theta)}} \gamma_{j,k}$$
where $\gamma_{j,k} = \mathrm{e}^{\mathrm{i}(\alpha_j + \beta_k)} \int_{\Omega_2} (T \mathbf{1}_{A_j}) \mathbf{1}_{B_k} \,\mathrm{d}\mu_2$ are constants independent of $z$. We readily see that $\Phi(z)$ is an entire function, bounded on the strip $0 \le \operatorname{\mathbb{R}e}z \le 1$. Then, in order to prove (2), we only need to show that

$$\begin{aligned} \left\vert\Phi(\mathrm{i}y)\right\vert &\le \|T\|_{L^{p_0} \to L^{q_0}} &&\text{and} & \left\vert\Phi(1 + \mathrm{i}y)\right\vert &\le \|T\|_{L^{p_1} \to L^{q_1}}\end{aligned}$$	3

for all $f_z$ and $g_z$ as constructed above. Indeed, if (3) holds true, by Hadamard three-lines theorem,
$$\left\vert\Phi(\theta + \mathrm{i}0)\right\vert = \biggl\vert\int_{\Omega_2} (Tf) g \,\mathrm{d}\mu_2\biggr\vert \le \|T\|_{L^{p_0} \to L^{q_0}}^{1-\theta}
\|T\|_{L^{p_1} \to L^{q_1}}^\theta$$
for all $f$ and $g$. This means, by fixing $f$, that
$$\sup_g \biggl\vert\int_{\Omega_2} (Tf) g \,\mathrm{d}\mu_2\biggr\vert \le \|T\|_{L^{p_0} \to L^{q_0}}^{1-\theta} \|T\|_{L^{p_1} \to L^{q_1}}^\theta$$
where the supremum is taken with respect to all $g$ simple functions with $\lVert g\rVert_{q_\theta'} = 1$. The left-hand side can be rewritten by means of the following lemma.

Lemma—Let $1\le p, p' \le \infty$ be conjugate exponents and let $f$ be a function in $L^p(\mu_1)$. Then
$$\lVert f\rVert_p = \sup \biggl|\int_{\Omega_1} fg \,\mathrm{d}\mu_1\biggr|$$
where the supremum is taken over all simple functions $g$ in $L^{p'}(\mu_1)$ such that $\lVert g\rVert_{p'} \le 1$.

In our case, the lemma above implies
$$\lVert Tf\rVert_{q_\theta} \le \|T\|_{L^{p_0} \to L^{q_0}}^{1-\theta} \|T\|_{L^{p_1} \to L^{q_1}}^\theta$$
for all simple function $f$ with $\lVert f\rVert_{p_\theta} = 1$. Equivalently, for a generic simple function,
$$\lVert Tf\rVert_{q_\theta} \le \|T\|_{L^{p_0} \to L^{q_0}}^{1-\theta} \|T\|_{L^{p_1} \to L^{q_1}}^\theta \lVert f\rVert_{p_\theta}.$$

==== Proof of (3) ====
Let us now prove that our claim (3) is indeed certain. The sequence $(A_j)_{j=1}^m$ consists of disjoint subsets in $\Sigma_1$ and, thus, each $\xi\in \Omega_1$ belongs to (at most) one of them, say $A_{\hat{\jmath}}$. Then, for $z=\mathrm{i}y$,
$$\begin{aligned}
\left\vert f_{\mathrm{i}y}(\xi)\right\vert &= \left\vert \left\vert a_{\hat{\jmath}}\right\vert^\frac{u(\mathrm{i}y)}{u(\theta)} \right\vert \\
&= \left\vert \exp\biggl(\log\left\vert a_{\hat{\jmath}}\right\vert\frac{p_\theta}{p_0}\biggr)
\exp\biggl(-\mathrm{i}y \log\left\vert a_{\hat{\jmath}}\right\vert p_\theta\biggl(\frac{1}{p_0}
- \frac{1}{p_1} \biggr) \biggr) \right\vert \\
&= \left\vert a_{\hat{\jmath}}\right\vert^{\frac{p_\theta}{p_0}} \\
& = \left\vert f(\xi)\right\vert^{\frac{p_\theta}{p_0}}\end{aligned}$$
which implies that $\lVert f_{\mathrm{i}y}\rVert_{p_0} \le \lVert f\rVert_{p_\theta}^{\frac{p_\theta}{p_0}}$. With a parallel argument, each $\zeta \in \Omega_2$ belongs to (at most) one of the sets supporting $g$, say $B_{\hat{k}}$, and
$$\left\vert g_{\mathrm{i}y}(\zeta)\right\vert = \left\vert b_{\hat{k}}\right\vert^{\frac{1-1/q_0}{1-1/q_\theta}}
= \left\vert g(\zeta)\right\vert^{\frac{1-1/q_0}{1-1/q_\theta}}
= \left\vert g(\zeta)\right\vert^{\frac{q_\theta'}{q_0'}}
\implies \lVert g_{\mathrm{i}y}\rVert_{q_0'} \le
\lVert g\rVert_{q_\theta'}^{\frac{q_\theta'}{q_0'}}.$$

We can now bound $\Phi(\mathrm{i}y)$: By applying Hölder’s inequality with conjugate exponents $q_0$ and $q_0'$, we have
$$\begin{aligned}
\left\vert\Phi(\mathrm{i}y)\right\vert &\le \lVert T f_{\mathrm{i}y}\rVert_{q_0} \lVert g_{\mathrm{i}y}\rVert_{q_0'} \\
&\le \|T\|_{L^{p_0} \to L^{q_0}} \lVert f_{\mathrm{i}y}\rVert_{p_0} \lVert g_{\mathrm{i}y}\rVert_{q_0'} \\
&= \|T\|_{L^{p_0} \to L^{q_0}} \lVert f\rVert_{p_\theta}^{\frac{p_\theta}{p_0}}
\lVert g\rVert_{q_\theta'}^{\frac{q_\theta'}{q_0'}} \\
&= \|T\|_{L^{p_0} \to L^{q_0}}.\end{aligned}$$

We can repeat the same process for $z=1+\mathrm{i}y$ to obtain $\left\vert f_{1+\mathrm{i} y}(\xi)\right\vert = \left\vert f(\xi)\right\vert^{p_\theta/p_1}$, $\left\vert g_{1+\mathrm{i}y}(\zeta)\right\vert = \left\vert g(\zeta)\right\vert^{q_\theta'/q_1'}$ and, finally,
$$\left\vert\Phi(1+\mathrm{i}y)\right\vert \le \|T\|_{L^{p_1} \to L^{q_1}} \lVert f_{1+\mathrm{i}y}\rVert_{p_1} \lVert g_{1+\mathrm{i}y}\rVert_{q_1'} =
\|T\|_{L^{p_1} \to L^{q_1}}.$$

=== Extension to all measurable functions in L^{p_{θ}} ===
So far, we have proven that

$$\lVert Tf\rVert_{q_\theta} \le \|T\|_{L^{p_\theta} \to L^{q_\theta}} \lVert f\rVert_{p_\theta}$$	4

when $f$ is a simple function. As already mentioned, the inequality holds true for all $f\in L^{p_\theta}(\Omega_1)$ by the density of simple functions in $L^{p_\theta}(\Omega_1)$.

Formally, let $f\in L^{p_\theta}(\Omega_1)$ and let $(f_n)_n$ be a sequence of simple functions such that $\left\vert f_n\right\vert \le \left\vert f\right\vert$, for all $n$, and $f_n \to f$ pointwise. Let $E=\{x\in \Omega_1: \left\vert f(x)\right\vert > 1\}$ and define $g = f \mathbf{1}_E$, $g_n = f_n \mathbf{1}_E$, $h = f - g = f \mathbf{1}_{E^\mathrm{c}}$ and $h_n = f_n - g_n$. Note that, since we are assuming $p_0 \le p_\theta \le p_1$,
$$\begin{aligned}
\lVert f\rVert_{p_\theta}^{p_\theta} &= \int_{\Omega_1} \left\vert f\right\vert^{p_\theta} \,\mathrm{d}\mu_1
\ge \int_{\Omega_1} \left\vert f\right\vert^{p_\theta} \mathbf{1}_{E} \,\mathrm{d}\mu_1
\ge \int_{\Omega_1} \left\vert f \mathbf{1}_{E}\right\vert^{p_0} \,\mathrm{d}\mu_1
= \int_{\Omega_1} \left\vert g\right\vert^{p_0} \,\mathrm{d}\mu_1 = \lVert g\rVert_{p_0}^{p_0} \\
\lVert f\rVert_{p_\theta}^{p_\theta} &= \int_{\Omega_1} \left\vert f\right\vert^{p_\theta} \,\mathrm{d}\mu_1
\ge \int_{\Omega_1} \left\vert f\right\vert^{p_\theta} \mathbf{1}_{E^\mathrm{c}} \,\mathrm{d}\mu_1
\ge \int_{\Omega_1} \left\vert f \mathbf{1}_{E^\mathrm{c}}\right\vert^{p_1} \,\mathrm{d}\mu_1
= \int_{\Omega_1} \left\vert h\right\vert^{p_1} \,\mathrm{d}\mu_1 = \lVert h\rVert_{p_1}^{p_1}\end{aligned}$$
and, equivalently, $g\in L^{p_0}(\Omega_1)$ and $h\in L^{p_1}(\Omega_1)$.

Let us see what happens in the limit for $n\to\infty$. Since $\left\vert f_n\right\vert \le \left\vert f\right\vert$, $\left\vert g_n\right\vert \le \left\vert g\right\vert$ and $\left\vert h_n\right\vert \le \left\vert h\right\vert$, by the dominated convergence theorem one readily has
$$\begin{aligned}
\lVert f_n\rVert_{p_\theta} &\to \lVert f\rVert_{p_\theta} &
\lVert g_n\rVert_{p_0} &\to \lVert g\rVert_{p_0} &
\lVert h_n\rVert_{p_1} &\to \lVert h\rVert_{p_1}.\end{aligned}$$
Similarly, $\left\vert f - f_n\right\vert \le 2\left\vert f\right\vert$, $\left\vert g-g_n\right\vert \le 2\left\vert g\right\vert$ and $\left\vert h - h_n\right\vert \le 2\left\vert h\right\vert$ imply
$$\begin{aligned}
\lVert f - f_n\rVert_{p_\theta} &\to 0 &
\lVert g - g_n\rVert_{p_0} &\to 0 &
\lVert h - h_n\rVert_{p_1} &\to 0\end{aligned}$$
and, by the linearity of $T$ as an operator of types $(p_0, q_0)$ and $(p_1, q_1)$ (we have not proven yet that it is of type $(p_\theta, q_\theta)$ for a generic $f$)
$$\begin{aligned}
\lVert Tg - Tg_n\rVert_{p_0} & \le \|T\|_{L^{p_0} \to L^{q_0}} \lVert g - g_n\rVert_{p_0} \to 0 &
\lVert Th - Th_n\rVert_{p_1} & \le \|T\|_{L^{p_1} \to L^{q_1}} \lVert h - h_n\rVert_{p_1} \to 0.\end{aligned}$$

It is now easy to prove that $Tg_n \to Tg$ and $Th_n \to Th$ in measure: For any $\epsilon > 0$, Chebyshev’s inequality yields
$$\mu_2(y\in \Omega_2: \left\vert Tg - Tg_n\right\vert > \epsilon) \le \frac{\lVert Tg - Tg_n\rVert_{q_0}^{q_0}}
{\epsilon^{q_0}}$$
and similarly for $Th - Th_n$. Then, $Tg_n \to Tg$ and $Th_n \to Th$ a.e. for some subsequence and, in turn, $Tf_n \to Tf$ a.e. Then, by Fatou’s lemma and recalling that (4) holds true for simple functions,
$$\lVert Tf\rVert_{q_\theta} \le \liminf_{n\to\infty} \lVert T f_n\rVert_{q_\theta} \le
\|T\|_{L^{p_\theta} \to L^{q_\theta}} \liminf_{n\to\infty} \lVert f_n\rVert_{p_\theta} = \|T\|_{L^{p_\theta} \to L^{q_\theta}}
\lVert f\rVert_{p_\theta}.$$

== Interpolation of analytic families of operators ==
The proof outline presented in the above section readily generalizes to the case in which the operator T is allowed to vary analytically. In fact, an analogous proof can be carried out to establish a bound on the entire function
$$\varphi(z) = \int (T_z f_z)g_z \, d\mu_2,$$
from which we obtain the following theorem of Elias Stein, published in his 1956 thesis:

Stein interpolation theorem—Let (Ω_{1}, Σ_{1}, μ_{1}) and (Ω_{2}, Σ_{2}, μ_{2}) be σ-finite measure spaces. Suppose 1 ≤ p_{0} , p_{1} ≤ ∞, 1 ≤ q_{0} , q_{1} ≤ ∞, and define:

S = {z ∈ C : 0 < Re(z) < 1},
S̅ = {z ∈ C : 0 ≤ Re(z) ≤ 1}.

We take a collection of linear operators {T_{z} : z ∈ S̅} on the space of simple functions in L^{1}(μ_{1}) into the space of all μ_{2}-measurable functions on Ω_{2}. We assume the following further properties on this collection of linear operators:

- The mapping
  $$z \mapsto \int (T_zf)g \, d\mu_2$$
  is continuous on S̅ and holomorphic on S for all simple functions f and g.
- For some constant k < π, the operators satisfy the uniform bound:
  $$\sup_{z \in S} e^{-k|\text{Im}(z)|} \log \left| \int (T_zf)g \, d\mu_2 \right| < \infty$$
- T_{z} maps L^{p_{0}}(μ_{1}) boundedly to L^{q_{0}}(μ_{2}) whenever Re(z) = 0.
- T_{z} maps L^{p_{1}}(μ_{1}) boundedly to L^{q_{1}}(μ_{2}) whenever Re(z) = 1.
- The operator norms satisfy the uniform bound
  $$\sup_{\text{Re}(z) = 0, 1} e^{-k|\text{Im}(z)|} \log \left \|T_z \right \| < \infty$$
  for some constant k < π.

Then, for each 0 < θ < 1, the operator T_{θ} maps L^{p_{θ}}(μ_{1}) boundedly into L^{q_{θ}}(μ_{2}).

The theory of real Hardy spaces and the space of bounded mean oscillations permits us to wield the Stein interpolation theorem argument in dealing with operators on the Hardy space H^{1}(R^{d}) and the space BMO of bounded mean oscillations; this is a result of Charles Fefferman and Elias Stein.

== Applications ==
=== Hausdorff–Young inequality ===
It has been shown in the first section that the Fourier transform $\mathcal{F}$ maps L^{1}(R^{d}) boundedly into L^{∞}(R^{d}) and L^{2}(R^{d}) into itself. A similar argument shows that the Fourier series operator, which transforms periodic functions f : T → C into functions $\hat{f}:\mathbf{Z} \to \mathbf{C}$ whose values are the Fourier coefficients
$$\hat{f}(n) = \frac{1}{2\pi} \int_{-\pi}^{\pi} f(x) e^{-inx} \, dx ,$$
maps L^{1}(T) boundedly into ℓ^{∞}(Z) and L^{2}(T) into ℓ^{2}(Z). The Riesz–Thorin interpolation theorem now implies the following:
$$\begin{align}
\left \|\mathcal{F}f \right \|_{L^{q}(\mathbf{R}^d)} &\leq \|f\|_{L^p(\mathbf{R}^d)} \\
\left \|\hat{f} \right \|_{\ell^{q}(\mathbf{Z})} &\leq \|f\|_{L^p(\mathbf{T})}
\end{align}$$
where 1 ≤ p ≤ 2 and 1/p + 1/q = 1. This is the Hausdorff–Young inequality.

The Hausdorff–Young inequality can also be established for the Fourier transform on locally compact Abelian groups. The norm estimate of 1 is not optimal. See the main article for references.

=== Convolution operators ===
Let f be a fixed integrable function and let T be the operator of convolution with f , i.e., for each function g we have Tg = f ∗ g.

It follows from Fubini's theorem that T is bounded from L^{1} to L^{1} and it is trivial that it is bounded from L^{∞} to L^{∞} (both bounds are by || f ||_{1}). Therefore the Riesz–Thorin theorem gives
$$\| f * g \|_p \leq \|f\|_1 \|g\|_p.$$

We take this inequality and switch the role of the operator and the operand, or in other words, we think of S as the operator of convolution with g, and get that S is bounded from L^{1} to L^{p}. Further, since g is in L^{p} we get, in view of Hölder's inequality, that S is bounded from L^{q} to L^{∞}, where again 1/p + 1/q = 1. So interpolating we get
$$\|f*g\|_s\leq \|f\|_r\|g\|_p$$
where the connection between p, r and s is
$$\frac{1}{r}+\frac{1}{p}=1+\frac{1}{s}.$$

=== The Hilbert transform ===
The Hilbert transform of f : R → C is given by
$$\mathcal{H}f(x) = \frac{1}{\pi} \, \mathrm{p.v.} \int_{-\infty}^\infty \frac{f(x-t)}{t} \, dt = \left(\frac{1}{\pi} \, \mathrm{p.v.} \frac{1}{t} \ast f\right)(x),$$
where p.v. indicates the Cauchy principal value of the integral. The Hilbert transform is a Fourier multiplier operator with a particularly simple multiplier:
$$\widehat{\mathcal{H}f}(\xi) = -i \, \sgn(\xi) \hat{f}(\xi).$$

It follows from the Plancherel theorem that the Hilbert transform maps L^{2}(R) boundedly into itself.

Nevertheless, the Hilbert transform is not bounded on L^{1}(R) or L^{∞}(R), and so we cannot use the Riesz–Thorin interpolation theorem directly. To see why we do not have these endpoint bounds, it suffices to compute the Hilbert transform of the simple functions 1_{(−1,1)}(x) and 1_{(0,1)}(x) − 1_{(0,1)}(−x). We can show, however, that
$$(\mathcal{H}f)^2 = f^2 + 2\mathcal{H}(f\mathcal{H}f)$$
for all Schwartz functions f : R → C, and this identity can be used in conjunction with the Cauchy–Schwarz inequality to show that the Hilbert transform maps L^{2^{n}}(R^{d}) boundedly into itself for all n ≥ 2. Interpolation now establishes the bound
$$\|\mathcal{H}f\|_p \leq A_p \|f\|_p$$
for all 2 ≤ p < ∞, and the self-adjointness of the Hilbert transform can be used to carry over these bounds to the 1 < p ≤ 2 case.

== Comparison with the real interpolation method ==
While the Riesz–Thorin interpolation theorem and its variants are powerful tools that yield a clean estimate on the interpolated operator norms, they suffer from numerous defects: some minor, some more severe. Note first that the complex-analytic nature of the proof of the Riesz–Thorin interpolation theorem forces the scalar field to be C. For extended-real-valued functions, this restriction can be bypassed by redefining the function to be finite everywhere—possible, as every integrable function must be finite almost everywhere. A more serious disadvantage is that, in practice, many operators, such as the Hardy–Littlewood maximal operator and the Calderón–Zygmund operators, do not have good endpoint estimates. In the case of the Hilbert transform in the previous section, we were able to bypass this problem by explicitly computing the norm estimates at several midway points. This is cumbersome and is often not possible in more general scenarios. Since many such operators satisfy the weak-type estimates
$$\mu \left( \{x : Tf(x) > \alpha \} \right) \leq \left( \frac{C_{p,q} \|f\|_p}{\alpha} \right)^q,$$
real interpolation theorems such as the Marcinkiewicz interpolation theorem are better-suited for them. Furthermore, a good number of important operators, such as the Hardy-Littlewood maximal operator, are only sublinear. This is not a hindrance to applying real interpolation methods, but complex interpolation methods are ill-equipped to handle non-linear operators. On the other hand, real interpolation methods, compared to complex interpolation methods, tend to produce worse estimates on the intermediate operator norms and do not behave as well off the diagonal in the Riesz diagram. The off-diagonal versions of the Marcinkiewicz interpolation theorem require the formalism of Lorentz spaces and do not necessarily produce norm estimates on the L^{p}-spaces.

== Mityagin's theorem ==
B. Mityagin extended the Riesz–Thorin theorem; this extension is formulated here in the special case of spaces of sequences with unconditional bases (cf. below).

Assume:
$$\|A\|_{\ell_1 \to \ell_1}, \|A\|_{\ell_\infty \to \ell_\infty} \leq M.$$

Then
$$\|A\|_{X \to X} \leq M$$

for any unconditional Banach space of sequences X, that is, for any $(x_i) \in X$ and any $(\varepsilon_i) \in \{-1, 1 \}^\infty$, $\| (\varepsilon_i x_i) \|_X = \| (x_i) \|_X$.

The proof is based on the Krein–Milman theorem.

== See also ==
- Marcinkiewicz interpolation theorem
- Interpolation space
