= Bounded mean oscillation =

Real-valued function

In harmonic analysis in mathematics, a function of bounded mean oscillation, also known as a BMO function, is a real-valued function whose mean oscillation is bounded (finite). The space of functions of bounded mean oscillation (BMO) is a function space that, in some precise sense, plays the same role in the theory of Hardy spaces H^{p} that the space L^{∞} of essentially bounded functions plays in the theory of L^{p}-spaces. It is also called John–Nirenberg space, after Fritz John and Louis Nirenberg who introduced and studied it for the first time.

== Historical note ==
According to Nirenberg (1985, p. 703 and p. 707), the space of functions of bounded mean oscillation was introduced by John (1961, pp. 410–411) in connection with his studies of mappings from a bounded set $\Omega$ belonging to $\mathbb{R}^n$ into $\mathbb{R}^n$ and the corresponding problems arising from elasticity theory, precisely from the concept of elastic strain: the basic notation was introduced in a closely following paper by John & Nirenberg (1961), where several properties of this function spaces were proved. The next important step in the development of the theory was the proof by Charles Fefferman of the duality between BMO and the Hardy space $H^1$, in the noted paper Fefferman & Stein 1972: a constructive proof of this result, introducing new methods and starting a further development of the theory, was given by Akihito Uchiyama.

== Definition ==
Definition 1. The mean oscillation of a locally integrable function $u$ over a hypercube $Q$ in $\mathbb{R}^n$ is defined as the value of the following integral:
$$\frac 1 {|Q|} \int_Q |u(y)-u_Q|\,\mathrm{d}y$$
where

- $|Q|$ is the volume of $Q$, i.e. its Lebesgue measure
- $u_Q$ is the average value of $u$ on the cube $Q$, i.e.
  $$u_Q = \frac 1 {|Q|}\int_Q u(y)\,\mathrm{d}y.$$

Definition 2. A BMO function is a locally integrable function $u$ whose mean oscillation supremum, taken over the set of all cubes $Q$ contained in $\mathbb{R}^n$, is finite.

The supremum of the mean oscillation is called the BMO norm of $u$ and is denoted by $\|u\|_\operatorname{BMO}$ (in some instances it is also denoted $\| u \|_*$). The space of BMO functions on a given domain $\Omega$ is denoted $\operatorname{BMO}(\Omega)$: when $\Omega = \mathbb{R}^n$, $\operatorname{BMO}(\mathbb{R}^n)$ is abbreviated as $\operatorname{BMO}$.

Note. The use of cubes $Q$ in $\mathbb{R}^n$ as the integration domains on which the mean oscillation is calculated, is not mandatory: Wiegerinck (2001) uses balls instead and, as remarked by Stein (1993, p. 140), in doing so a perfectly equivalent definition of functions of bounded mean oscillation arises.

== Basic properties ==
=== BMO functions are locally p-integrable ===
$\operatorname{BMO}$ functions are locally $L^p$ if $0<p<\infty$, but need not be locally bounded. In fact, using the John-Nirenberg inequality, we can prove that

$$\|u\|_\text{BMO}\simeq\sup_Q\left(\frac{1}{|Q|}\int_Q|u-u_Q|^p dx\right)^{1/p}.$$

=== BMO is a Banach space ===
Constant functions have zero mean oscillation, therefore functions differing for a constant $c>0$ can share the same $\operatorname{BMO}$ norm value even if their difference is not zero almost everywhere. Therefore, the function $\| \cdot \|_\operatorname{BMO}$ is properly a norm on the quotient space of $\operatorname{BMO}$ functions modulo the space of constant functions on the domain considered.

=== Averages of adjacent cubes are comparable ===
As the name suggests, the mean or average of a function in $\operatorname{BMO}$ does not oscillate very much when computing it over cubes close to each other in position and scale. Precisely, if $Q$ and $R$ are dyadic cubes such that their boundaries touch and the side length of $Q$ is no less than one-half the side length of $R$ (and vice versa), then

$$|f_R-f_Q|\leq C\|f\|_\text{BMO}$$

where $C > 0$ is some universal constant. This property is, in fact, equivalent to $f$ being in $\operatorname{BMO}$, that is, if $f$ is a locally integrable function such that $|f_R-f_Q| \leq C$ for all dyadic cubes $Q$ and $R$ adjacent in the sense described above and $f$ is in dyadic $\operatorname{BMO}$ (where the supremum is only taken over dyadic cubes $Q$), then $f$ is in $\operatorname{BMO}$.

=== BMO is the dual vector space of H^{1} ===
Fefferman (1971) showed that the $\operatorname{BMO}$ space is dual to $H^1$, the Hardy space with $p = 1$. The pairing between $f \in H^1$ and $g \in \operatorname{BMO}$ is given by

$$(f,g) = \int_{\R^n} f(x) g(x) \, \mathrm{d}x$$

though some care is needed in defining this integral, as it does not in general converge absolutely.

=== The John–Nirenberg inequality ===
The John–Nirenberg inequality is an estimate that governs how far a function of bounded mean oscillation may deviate from its average by a certain amount.

==== Statement ====
For each $f\in\operatorname{BMO}\left(\mathbb{R}^n\right)$, there are constants $c_1,c_2>0$ (independent of $f$), such that for any cube $Q$ in $\mathbb{R}^n$,
$$\left | \left \{x\in Q: |f-f_{Q}|>\lambda \right \} \right |\leq c_{1}\exp \left (-c_2 \frac{\lambda}{\|f\|_\operatorname{BMO}} \right )|Q|.$$

Conversely, if this inequality holds over all cubes with some constant $C$ in place of $\| f \|_\operatorname{BMO}$, then $f$ is in $\operatorname{BMO}$ with norm at most a constant times $C$.

==== A consequence: the distance in BMO to L^{∞} ====
The John–Nirenberg inequality can actually give more information than just the $\operatorname{BMO}$ norm of a function. For a locally integrable function $f$, let $A(f)$ be the infimal $A>0$ for which

$$\sup_{Q\subseteq\mathbb{R}^n}\frac{1}{|Q|} \int_{Q}e^{\left|f-f_{Q}\right|/A} \mathrm{d}x<\infty.$$

The John–Nirenberg inequality implies that $A(f)\leq C \| f \|_\operatorname{BMO}$ for some universal constant $C$. For an $L^\infty$ function, however, the above inequality will hold for all $A>0$. In other words, $A(f)=0$ if $f$ is in $L^\infty$. Hence the constant $A(f)$ gives us a way of measuring how far a function in $\operatorname{BMO}$ is from the subspace $L^\infty$. This statement can be made more precise: there is a constant $C$, depending only on the dimension $n$, such that for any function $f\in \operatorname{BMO}(\mathbb{R}^n)$ the following two-sided inequality holds

$$\frac 1 C A(f) \leq \inf_{g\in L^\infty} \|f-g\|_\text{BMO}\leq CA(f).$$

== Generalizations and extensions ==
=== The spaces BMOH and BMOA ===
When the dimension of the ambient space is 1, the space BMO can be seen as a linear subspace of harmonic functions on the unit disk and plays a major role in the theory of Hardy spaces: by using definition 2, it is possible to define the BMO(T) space on the unit circle as the space of functions f : T → R such that

$$\frac 1 {|I|}\int_I|f(y)-f_I|\,\mathrm{d}y < C <+\infty$$

i.e. such that its mean oscillation over every arc I of the unit circle is bounded. Here as before f_{I} is the mean value of f over the arc I.

Definition 3. An Analytic function on the unit disk is said to belong to the Harmonic BMO or in the BMOH space if and only if it is the Poisson integral of a BMO(T) function. Therefore, BMOH is the space of all functions u with the form:

$$u(a) = \frac{1}{2\pi} \int_{\mathbf{T}}\frac{1-|a|^2}{\left|a-e^{i\theta}\right|^2} f(e^{i\theta})\,\mathrm{d}\theta$$

equipped with the norm:

$$\|u\|_\text{BMOH}=\sup _ {|a|<1} \left\{\frac 1 {2\pi} \int_{\mathbf{T}}\frac{1-|a|^2}{|a-e^{i\theta}|^2} \left|f(e^{i\theta})-u(a)\right| \mathrm{d}\theta\right\}$$

The subspace of analytic functions belonging BMOH is called the Analytic BMO space or the BMOA space.

==== BMOA as the dual space of H^{1}(D) ====
Charles Fefferman in his original work proved that the real BMO space is dual to the real valued harmonic Hardy space on the upper half-space R^{n} × (0, ∞]. In the theory of Complex and Harmonic analysis on the unit disk, his result is stated as follows. Let H^{p}(D) be the Analytic Hardy space on the unit Disc. For p = 1 we identify (H^{1})* with BMOA by pairing f ∈ H^{1}(D) and g ∈ BMOA using the anti-linear transformation T_{g}

$$T_g(f) = \lim_{r \to 1} \int_{-\pi}^\pi \bar{g}(e^{i\theta}) f(re^{i\theta}) \, \mathrm{d}\theta$$

Notice that although the limit always exists for an H^{1} function f and T_{g} is an element of the dual space (H^{1})*, since the transformation is anti-linear, we don't have an isometric isomorphism between (H^{1})* and BMOA. However, one can obtain an isometry if they consider a kind of space of conjugate BMOA functions.

=== The space VMO ===
The space VMO of functions of vanishing mean oscillation is the closure in BMO of the continuous functions that vanish at infinity. It can also be defined as the space of functions whose "mean oscillations" on cubes Q are not only bounded, but also tend to zero uniformly as the radius of the cube Q tends to 0 or ∞. The space VMO is a sort of Hardy space analogue of the space of continuous functions vanishing at infinity, and in particular the real valued harmonic Hardy space H^{1} is the dual of VMO.

=== Relation to the Hilbert transform ===
A locally integrable function f on R is BMO if and only if it can be written as

$$f=f_1 + H f_2 + \alpha$$

where f_{i} ∈ L^{∞}, α is a constant and H is the Hilbert transform.

The BMO norm is then equivalent to the infimum of $\|f_1\|_\infty + \|f_2\|_\infty$ over all such representations.

Similarly f is VMO if and only if it can be represented in the above form with f_{i} bounded uniformly continuous functions on R.

=== The dyadic BMO space ===
Let Δ denote the set of dyadic cubes in R^{n}. The space dyadic BMO, written BMO_{d}, is the space of functions satisfying the same inequality as for BMO functions, only that the supremum is over all dyadic cubes. This supremum is sometimes denoted ‖·‖_{BMO_{d}}.

This space properly contains BMO. In particular, the function log(x)χ_{[0,∞)} is a function that is in dyadic BMO but not in BMO. However, if a function f is such that ‖f(·−x)‖_{BMO_{d}} ≤ C for all x in R^{n} for some C > 0, then by the one-third trick f is also in BMO. In the case of BMO on T^{n} instead of R^{n}, a function f is such that ‖f(·−x)‖_{BMO_{d}} ≤ C for n+1 suitably chosen x, then f is also in BMO. This means BMO(T^{n}) is the intersection of n+1 translations of dyadic BMO. By duality, H^{1}(T^{n}) is the sum of n+1 translations of dyadic H^{1}.

Although dyadic BMO is a much narrower class than BMO, many theorems that are true for BMO are much simpler to prove for dyadic BMO, and in some cases one can recover the original BMO theorems by proving them first in the special dyadic case.

== Examples ==
Examples of $\operatorname{BMO}$ functions include the following:

- All bounded (measurable) functions. If $f$ is in $L^\infty$, then $\| f \|_\operatorname{BMO} \leq 2\| f \|_\infty$: however, the converse is not true as the following example shows.
- The function $\log|P|$ for any polynomial $P$ that is not identically zero: in particular, this is true also for $|P(x)| = |x|$.
- If $w$ is an $A_\infty$ weight, then $\log(w)$ is $\operatorname{BMO}$. Conversely, if $f$ is $BMO$, then $e^{\delta f}$ is an $A_\infty$ weight for $\delta>0$ small enough: this fact is a consequence of the John–Nirenberg inequality.
