= Besicovitch covering theorem =

Open cover in mathematical analysis

In mathematical analysis, a Besicovitch cover, named after Abram Samoilovitch Besicovitch, is an open cover of a subset E of the Euclidean space R^{N} by balls such that each point of E is the center of some ball in the cover.

The Besicovitch covering theorem asserts that there exists a constant c_{N} depending only on the dimension N with the following property:

- Given any Besicovitch cover F of a bounded set E, there are c_{N} subcollections of balls A_{1} = {B_{n_{1}}}, …, A_{c_{N}} = {B_{n_{c_{N}}}} contained in F such that each collection A_{i} consists of disjoint balls, and

$$E \subseteq \bigcup_{i=1}^{c_N} \bigcup_{B\in A_i} B.$$

Let G denote the subcollection of F consisting of all balls from the c_{N} disjoint families A_{1},...,A_{c_{N}}. The less precise following statement is clearly true: every point x ∈ R^{N} belongs to at most c_{N} different balls from the subcollection G, and G remains a cover for E (every point y ∈ E belongs to at least one ball from the subcollection G). This property gives actually an equivalent form for the theorem (except for the value of the constant).

- There exists a constant b_{N} depending only on the dimension N with the following property: Given any Besicovitch cover F of a bounded set E, there is a subcollection G of F such that G is a cover of the set E and every point x ∈ E belongs to at most b_{N} different balls from the subcover G.

In other words, the function S_{G} equal to the sum of the indicator functions of the balls in G is larger than 1_{E} and bounded on R^{N} by the constant b_{N},

$$\mathbf{1}_E \le S_{\mathbf {G}} := \sum_{B \in \mathbf{G}} \mathbf{1}_B \le b_N.$$

== Application to maximal functions and maximal inequalities ==
Let μ be a Borel non-negative measure on R^{N}, finite on compact subsets and let $f$ be a $\mu$-integrable function. Define the maximal function $f^*$ by setting for every $x$ (using the convention $\infty \times 0 = 0$)

$$f^*(x) = \sup_{r > 0} \Bigl( \mu(B(x, r))^{-1} \int_{B(x, r)} |f(y)| \, d\mu(y) \Bigr).$$

This maximal function is lower semicontinuous, hence measurable. The following maximal inequality is satisfied for every λ > 0:

$$\lambda \, \mu \bigl( \{ x : f^*(x) > \lambda \} \bigr) \le b_N \, \int |f| \, d\mu.$$

Proof.

The set E_{λ} of the points x such that $f^*(x) > \lambda$ clearly admits a Besicovitch cover F_{λ} by balls B such that

$$\int \mathbf{1}_B \, |f| \ d\mu = \int_{B} |f(y)| \, d\mu(y) > \lambda \, \mu(B).$$

For every bounded Borel subset E´ of E_{λ}, one can find a subcollection G extracted from F_{λ} that covers E´ and such that S_{G} ≤ b_{N}, hence

$$\begin{align}
\lambda \, \mu(E') &\le \lambda \, \sum_{B \in \mathbf{G}} \mu(B)\\
&\le \sum_{B \in \mathbf{G}} \int \mathbf{1}_B \, |f| \, d\mu = \int S_{\mathbf {G}} \, |f| \, d\mu \le b_N \, \int |f| \, d\mu,
\end{align}$$

which implies the inequality above.

When dealing with the Lebesgue measure on R^{N}, it is more customary to use the easier (and older) Vitali covering lemma in order to derive the previous maximal inequality (with a different constant).

== See also ==
- Vitali covering lemma
