= Thorin =

Thorin may refer to:

- Thorin II Oakenshield, a Dwarf in J. R. R. Tolkien's The Hobbit
- Thorin (chemistry), an organic arsenic compound used in the determination of thorium and barium
- Donald E. Thorin (1934–2016), American cinematographer
- Olof Thorin (1912–2004), Swedish mathematician
- Thorin, Germanic name for males, representing the Germanic God Thor
- Thorin, pseudonym of esports journalist & commentator Duncan Shields
- Thorin, a male Neanderthal individual, whose remains have been found at Mandrin Cave, France
