= Singular integral =

Functions in harmonic analysis mathematics

In mathematics, singular integrals are central to harmonic analysis and are intimately connected with the study of partial differential equations. Broadly speaking a singular integral is an integral operator

$$T(f)(x) = \int K(x,y)f(y) \, dy,$$

whose kernel function $K: \mathbb R^n \times \mathbb R^n \to \mathbb R$ is singular along the diagonal $x=y$. Specifically, the singularity is such that $|K(x,y)|$ is of size $|x-y|^{-n}$ asymptotically as $|x-y| \to 0$. Since such integrals may not in general be absolutely integrable, a rigorous definition must define them as the limit of the integral over $|y-x| > \epsilon$ as $\epsilon \to 0$, but in practice this is a technicality. Usually further assumptions are required to obtain results such as their boundedness on Lp spaces, for example $L^p(\mathbb R^n)$.

== The Hilbert transform ==
The archetypal singular integral operator is the Hilbert transform $H$. It is given by convolution against the kernel $K(x)=1/(\pi x)$ for $x$ in $\mathbb R$. More precisely,

$$H(f)(x) = \frac{1}{\pi}\lim_{\varepsilon \to 0} \int_{|x-y|>\varepsilon} \frac{1}{x-y}f(y) \, dy.$$

The most straightforward higher dimension analogues of these are the Riesz transforms, which replace $K(x)=1/x$ with

$$K_i(x) = \frac{x_i}{|x|^{n+1}}$$

where $i = 1, ..., n$ and $x_i$ is the $i$-th component of $x$ in $\mathbb R^n$. All of these operators are bounded on $L^p$ and satisfy weak-type $(1,1)$ estimates.

== Singular integrals of convolution type ==
A singular integral of convolution type is an operator $T$ defined by convolution with a kernel $K$ that is locally integrable on $R^n\setminus \{0\}$, in the sense that

$T(f)(x) = \lim_{\varepsilon \to 0} \int_{|y-x|>\varepsilon} K(x-y)f(y) \, dy.$	1

Suppose that the kernel satisfies:

1. The size condition on the Fourier transform of $K$
  $$\hat{K}\in L^\infty(\mathbb{R}^n)$$
2. The smoothness condition: for some $C>0$,
  $$\sup_{y \neq 0} \int_{|x|>2|y|} |K(x-y) - K(x)| \, dx \leq C.$$

Then it can be shown that $T$ is bounded on $L^p(\mathbb R^n)$ and satisfies a weak-type $(1,1)$ estimate.

Property 1. is needed to ensure that convolution (1) with the tempered distribution p.v. $K$ given by the principal value integral

$$\operatorname{p.v.}\,\, K[\phi] = \lim_{\epsilon\to 0^+} \int_{|x|>\epsilon}\phi(x)K(x)\,dx$$

is a well-defined Fourier multiplier on $L^2$. Neither of the properties 1. or 2. is necessarily easy to verify, and a variety of sufficient conditions exist. Typically in applications, one also has a cancellation condition

$$\int_{R_1<|x|<R_2} K(x) \, dx = 0 ,\ \forall R_1,R_2 > 0$$

which is quite easy to check. It is automatic, for instance, if $K$ is an odd function. If, in addition, one assumes 2. and the following size condition

$$\sup_{R>0} \int_{R<|x|<2R} |K(x)| \, dx \leq C,$$

then it can be shown that 1. follows.

The smoothness condition 2. is also often difficult to check in principle, the following sufficient condition of a kernel $K$ can be used:

- $K\in C^1(\mathbf{R}^n\setminus\{0\})$
- $|\nabla K(x)|\le\frac{C}{|x|^{n+1}}$

Observe that these conditions are satisfied for the Hilbert and Riesz transforms, so this result is an extension of those result.

== Singular integrals of non-convolution type ==
These are even more general operators. However, since our assumptions are so weak, it is not necessarily the case that these operators are bounded on $L^p$.

=== Calderón–Zygmund kernels ===
A function $K: \mathbb R^n \times \mathbb R^n \to \mathbb R$ is said to be a Calderón–Zygmund kernel if it satisfies the following conditions for some constants $C>0$ and $\delta > 0$.

1. $$|K(x,y)| \leq \frac{C}{|x - y|^n}$$
2. $$|K(x,y) - K(x',y)| \leq \frac{C|x-x'|^\delta}{\bigl(|x-y|+|x'-y|\bigr)^{n+\delta}}\text{ whenever }|x-x'| \leq \frac{1}{2}\max\bigl(|x-y|,|x'-y|\bigr)$$
3. $$|K(x,y) - K(x,y')| \leq \frac{C |y-y'|^\delta}{\bigl(|x-y| + |x-y'| \bigr)^{n+\delta}}\text{ whenever }|y-y'| \leq \frac{1}{2}\max\bigl(|x-y'|,|x-y|\bigr)$$

=== Singular integrals of non-convolution type ===
$T$ is said to be a singular integral operator of non-convolution type associated to the Calderón–Zygmund kernel $K$ if

$$\int g(x) T(f)(x) \, dx = \iint g(x) K(x,y) f(y) \, dy \, dx,$$

whenever $f$ and $g$ are smooth and have disjoint support. Such operators need not be bounded on $L^p$

=== Calderón–Zygmund operators ===
A singular integral of non-convolution type $T$ associated to a Calderón–Zygmund kernel $K$ is called a Calderón–Zygmund operator when it is bounded on $L^2$, that is, there is a $C>0$ such that

$$\|T(f)\|_{L^2} \leq C\|f\|_{L^2},$$

for all smooth compactly supported ƒ.

It can be proved that such operators are, in fact, also bounded on all $L^p$ with $1 < p < \infty$.

=== The $T(b)$ theorem ===
The $T(b)$ theorem provides sufficient conditions for a singular integral operator to be a Calderón–Zygmund operator, that is for a singular integral operator associated to a Calderón–Zygmund kernel to be bounded on $L^2$. In order to state the result we must first define some terms.

A normalised bump is a smooth function $\varphi$ on $\mathbb R^n$ supported in a ball of radius 1 and centred at the origin such that $|\partial^\alpha\varphi(x)|<1$, for all multi-indices $|\alpha| \leq n + 2$. Denote by $\tau^x(\varphi)(y)= \varphi (y - x)$ and $\varphi_r(x)=r^{-n}\varphi(x/r)$ for all $x$ in $\mathbb R^n$ and $r > 0$. An operator is said to be weakly bounded if there is a constant $C$ such that

$$\left|\int T\bigl(\tau^x(\varphi_r)\bigr)(y) \tau^x(\psi_r)(y) \, dy\right| \leq Cr^{-n}$$

for all normalised bumps $\varphi$ and $\psi$. A function is said to be accretive if there is a constant $c>0$ such that $Re(b)(x) \geq c$ for all $x$ in $\mathbb R$. Denote by $M_b$ the operator given by multiplication by a function $b$.

The $T(b)$ theorem states that a singular integral operator $T$ associated to a Calderón–Zygmund kernel is bounded on $L^2$ if it satisfies all of the following three conditions for some bounded accretive functions $b_1$ and $b_2$:

1. $M_{b_2}TM_{b_1}$ is weakly bounded;
2. $T(b_1)$ is in BMO;
3. $T^t(b_2),$ is in BMO, where $T^t$ is the transpose operator of $T$.

== See also ==
- Singular integral operators on closed curves
