= Riesz transform =

Type of singular integral operator

In the mathematical theory of harmonic analysis, the Riesz transforms are a family of generalizations of the Hilbert transform to Euclidean spaces of dimension d > 1. They are a type of singular integral operator, meaning that they are given by a convolution of one function with another function having a singularity at the origin. Specifically, the Riesz transforms of a complex-valued function ƒ on R^{d} are defined by

$R_jf(x) = c_d\lim_{\epsilon\to 0}\int_{\mathbf{R}^d\backslash B_\epsilon(x)}\frac{(x_j-t_j)f(t)}{|x-t|^{d+1}}\,dt$	1

for j = 1,2,...,d. The constant c_{d} is a dimensional normalization given by

$$c_d = \frac{1}{\pi\omega_{d-1}} = \frac{\Gamma[(d+1)/2]}{\pi^{(d+1)/2}}.$$

where ω_{d−1} is the volume of the unit (d − 1)-ball. The limit is written in various ways, often as a principal value, or as a convolution with the tempered distribution

$$K(x) = \frac{1}{\pi\omega_{d-1}} \, p.v. \frac{x_j}{|x|^{d+1}}.$$

The Riesz transforms arises in the study of differentiability properties of harmonic potentials in potential theory and harmonic analysis. In particular, they arise in the proof of the Calderón-Zygmund inequality (Gilbarg & Trudinger 1983, §9.4).

== Multiplier properties ==
The Riesz transforms are given by a Fourier multiplier. Indeed, the Fourier transform of R_{j}ƒ is given by

$$\mathcal{F}(R_jf)(x) = -i\frac{x_j}{|x|}(\mathcal{F}f)(x).$$

In this form, the Riesz transforms are seen to be generalizations of the Hilbert transform. The kernel is a distribution which is homogeneous of degree zero. A particular consequence of this last observation is that the Riesz transform defines a bounded linear operator from L^{2}(R^{d}) to itself.

This homogeneity property can also be stated more directly without the aid of the Fourier transform. If σ_{s} is the dilation on R^{d} by the scalar s, that is σ_{s}x = sx, then σ_{s} defines an action on functions via pullback:

$$\sigma_s^* f = f\circ\sigma_s.$$

The Riesz transforms commute with σ_{s}:

$$\sigma_s^* (R_jf) = R_j(\sigma_x^*f).$$

Similarly, the Riesz transforms commute with translations. Let τ_{a} be the translation on R^{d} along the vector a; that is, τ_{a}(x) = x + a. Then

$$\tau_a^* (R_jf) = R_j(\tau_a^*f).$$

For the final property, it is convenient to regard the Riesz transforms as a single vectorial entity Rƒ = (R_{1}ƒ,...,R_{d}ƒ). Consider a rotation ρ in R^{d}. The rotation acts on spatial variables, and thus on functions via pullback. But it also can act on the spatial vector Rƒ. The final transformation property asserts that the Riesz transform is equivariant with respect to these two actions; that is,

$$\rho^* R_j [(\rho^{-1})^*f] = \sum_{k=1}^d \rho_{jk} R_kf.$$

These three properties in fact characterize the Riesz transform in the following sense. Let T=(T_{1},...,T_{d}) be a d-tuple of bounded linear operators from L^{2}(R^{d}) to L^{2}(R^{d}) such that

- T commutes with all dilations and translations.
- T is equivariant with respect to rotations.

Then, for some constant c, T = cR.

== Relationship with the Laplacian ==
Formally, the Riesz transforms can be identified with fractional derivatives via

$R f = -\,\nabla (-\Delta)^{-1/2} f$,

that is, $R_j = -\,\partial_j (-\Delta)^{-1/2}$.

In particular, one has the operator identity

$\partial_i \partial_j = -\,R_i R_j \Delta$,

valid as Fourier multipliers on $\mathcal{S}(\mathbb{R}^d)$ and, by extension, on the space of tempered distributions $\mathcal{S}'$.

For Schwartz functions $u$, this implies

$R_i R_j(\Delta u) = -\,\tfrac{\partial^2 u}{\partial x_i \partial x_j}$.

The situation becomes subtler for general tempered distributions. If $\Delta u \in L^2(\mathbb{R}^d)$, then $u$ is determined modulo affine functions, which have vanishing second derivatives, and the above identity holds in $L^2$ without correction.

More generally, if $u$ is such that $\Delta u$ has only tempered growth but not integrability (for instance, if $u$ is a quadratic polynomial), then additional polynomial terms may appear:

$\tfrac{\partial^2 u}{\partial x_i \partial x_j} = -\,R_i R_j (\Delta u) + P_{ij}(x)$,

where $P_{ij}$ is a polynomial depending on $u$. This reflects the fact that inversion of the Laplacian is only well-defined on tempered distributions modulo polynomials.

== See also ==
- Hilbert Transform
- Poisson kernel
- Riesz potential
