= Calderón–Zygmund lemma =

Analysis theorem

In mathematics, the Calderón–Zygmund lemma is a fundamental result in Fourier analysis, harmonic analysis, and singular integrals. It is named for the mathematicians Alberto Calderón and Antoni Zygmund.

Given an integrable function f : R^{d} → C, where R^{d} denotes Euclidean space and C denotes the complex numbers, the lemma gives a precise way of partitioning R^{d} into two sets: one where f is essentially small; the other a countable collection of cubes where f is essentially large, but where some control of the function is retained.

This leads to the associated Calderón–Zygmund decomposition of f, wherein f is written as the sum of "good" and "bad" functions, using the above sets.

== Covering lemma ==
Let f : R^{d} → C be integrable and α be a positive constant. Then there exists an open set Ω such that:

(1) Ω is a disjoint union of open cubes, Ω = ∪_{k} Q_{k}, such that for each Q_{k},

$$\alpha\le  \frac{1}{m(Q_k)} \int_{Q_k} |f(x)| \, dx \leq 2^d \alpha.$$

(2) |f(x)| ≤ α almost everywhere in the complement F of Ω.

Here, $m(Q_k)$ denotes the measure of the set $Q_k$.

== Calderón–Zygmund decomposition ==
Given f as above, we may write f as the sum of a "good" function g and a "bad" function b, f = g + b. To do this, we define

$$g(x) =  \begin{cases}f(x), & x \in F, \\ \frac{1}{m(Q_j)}\int_{Q_j}f(t)\,dt, & x \in Q_j,\end{cases}$$

and let b = f − g. Consequently we have that

$$b(x) = 0,\ x\in F$$
$$\frac{1}{m(Q_j)}\int_{Q_j} b(x)\, dx = 0$$

for each cube Q_{j}.

The function b is thus supported on a collection of cubes where f is allowed to be "large", but has the beneficial property that its average value is zero on each of these cubes. Meanwhile, |g(x)| ≤ α for almost every x in F, and on each cube in Ω, g is equal to the average value of f over that cube, which by the covering chosen is not more than 2^{d}α.

== See also ==
- Singular integral operators of convolution type, for a proof and application of the lemma in one dimension.
- Rising sun lemma
