= Spectral decomposition =

Spectral decomposition is any of several things:

- Spectral decomposition for matrix: eigendecomposition of a matrix
- Spectral decomposition for linear operator: spectral theorem
- Decomposition of spectrum (functional analysis)
