= Lebesgue's density theorem =

Theorem in analysis

In mathematics, Lebesgue's density theorem states that for any Lebesgue measurable set $A\subseteq \R^n$, the "density" of $A$ is 0 or 1 at almost every point in $\R^n$. Additionally, the "density" of $A$ is 1 at almost every point of $A$. Intuitively, this means that the boundary of $A$, the set of points in $A$ for which all neighborhoods are partially in $A$ and partially outside $A$, is of measure zero.

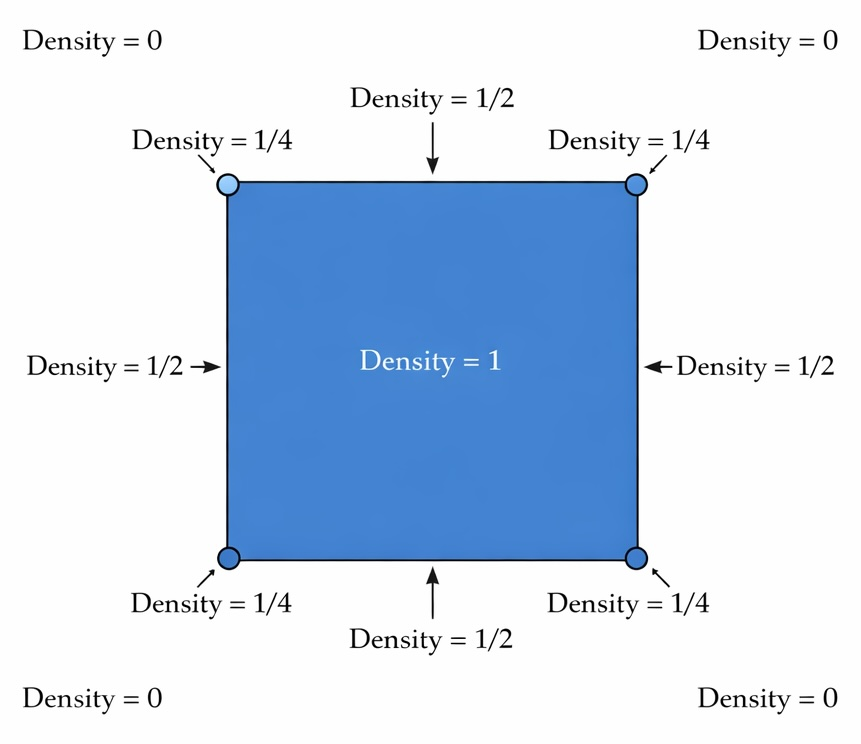
Lebesgue's density theorem, applied to the inside of a square, its corners, edges, inside, and outside

== Statement ==
Let $\mu$ be the Lebesgue measure on the Euclidean space and $A\subseteq \R^n$ be a Lebesgue measurable set. Let $x\in \R^n$ and let $B$_{ε}$(x)$ denote the open ball of radius $\varepsilon$ centered at $x$. Define the density at a point $x$

$$\qquad\qquad d_A(x)=\lim_{\varepsilon\to 0}\frac{\mu(A\cap B_\varepsilon(x))}{\mu(B_\varepsilon(x))}$$

Lebesgue's density theorem—For a measurable set $A\subseteq \mathbb R^n$, the density of $A$ is 0 or 1 almost everywhere. That is, the set of points which do not have density 0 or 1, $\{x\in \mathbb R^n\mid d_A(x)\notin\{0,1\}\}$, has measure 0. Furthermore if $0<\mu(A)<\infty$, then there are always points of $A$ where the density either does not exist or exists but is neither 0 nor 1.

For example, given a square in the plane, the density at every point inside the square is 1, on the edges is 1/2, and at the corners is 1/4. The set of points in the plane at which the density is neither 0 nor 1 is non-empty (the square boundary), but it is of measure zero.

The Lebesgue density theorem is a particular case of the Lebesgue differentiation theorem.

Thus, this theorem is also true for every finite Borel measure on $A\subseteq \R^n$ instead of Lebesgue measure, as proven in sections 2.8–2.9 of Federer's Geometric Measure Theory, 1969.

== See also ==
- Lebesgue differentiation theorem – Mathematical theorem in real analysis
