= Olof Thorin =

Swedish mathematician (1912–2004)

G. Olof Thorin (23 February 1912, Halmstad – 14 February 2004, Danderyd Hospital) was a Swedish mathematician working on analysis and probability, who introduced the Riesz–Thorin theorem.
