= Marcinkiewicz interpolation theorem =

Mathematical theory by discovered by Józef Marcinkiewicz

In mathematics, particularly in functional analysis, the Marcinkiewicz interpolation theorem, discovered by Józef Marcinkiewicz (1939), is a result bounding the norms of non-linear operators acting on L^{p} spaces.

Marcinkiewicz' theorem is similar to the Riesz–Thorin theorem about linear operators, but also applies to non-linear operators.

== Preliminaries ==
Let f be a measurable function with real or complex values, defined on a measure space (X, F, ω). The distribution function of f is defined by

$$\lambda_f(t) = \omega\left\{x\in X\mid |f(x)| > t\right\}.$$

Then f is called weak $L^1$ if there exists a constant C such that the distribution function of f satisfies the following inequality for all t > 0:

$$\lambda_f(t)\leq \frac{C}{t}.$$

The smallest constant C in the inequality above is called the weak $L^1$ norm and is usually denoted by $\|f\|_{1,w}$ or $\|f\|_{1,\infty}.$ Similarly the space is usually denoted by L^{1,w} or L^{1,∞}.

(Note: This terminology is a bit misleading since the weak norm does not satisfy the triangle inequality as one can see by considering the sum of the functions on $(0,1)$ given by $1/x$ and $1/(1-x)$, which has norm 4 not 2.)

Any $L^1$ function belongs to L^{1,w} and in addition one has the inequality

$$\|f\|_{1,w}\leq \|f\|_1.$$

This is nothing but Markov's inequality (a.k.a. Chebyshev's Inequality). The converse is not true. For example, the function 1/x belongs to L^{1,w} but not to L^{1}.

Similarly, one may define the weak $L^p$ space as the space of all functions f such that $|f|^p$ belong to L^{1,w}, and the weak $L^p$ norm using

$$\|f\|_{p,w}= \left \||f|^p  \right \|_{1,w}^{\frac{1}{p}}.$$

More directly, the L^{p,w} norm is defined as the best constant C in the inequality

$$\lambda_f(t) \le \frac{C^p}{t^p}$$

for all t > 0.

== Formulation ==
Informally, Marcinkiewicz's theorem is

Theorem. Let T be a bounded linear operator from $L^p$ to $L^{p,w}$ and at the same time from $L^q$ to $L^{q,w}$. Then T is also a bounded operator from $L^r$ to $L^r$ for any r between p and q.

In other words, even if one only requires weak boundedness on the extremes p and q, regular boundedness still holds. To make this more formal, one has to explain that T is bounded only on a dense subset and can be completed. See Riesz-Thorin theorem for these details.

Where Marcinkiewicz's theorem is weaker than the Riesz-Thorin theorem is in the estimates of the norm. The theorem gives bounds for the $L^r$ norm of T but this bound increases to infinity as r converges to either p or q. Specifically (DiBenedetto 2002, Theorem VIII.9.2), suppose that

$$\|Tf\|_{p,w} \le N_p\|f\|_p,$$
$$\|Tf\|_{q,w} \le N_q\|f\|_q,$$

so that the operator norm of T from L^{p} to L^{p,w} is at most N_{p}, and the operator norm of T from L^{q} to L^{q,w} is at most N_{q}. Then the following interpolation inequality holds for all r between p and q and all f ∈ L^{r}:

$$\|Tf\|_r\le \gamma N_p^\delta N_q^{1-\delta}\|f\|_r$$

where

$$\delta=\frac{p(q-r)}{r(q-p)}$$

and

$$\gamma=2\left(\frac{r(q-p)}{(r-p)(q-r)}\right)^{1/r}.$$

The constants δ and γ can also be given for q = ∞ by passing to the limit.

A version of the theorem also holds more generally if T is only assumed to be a quasilinear operator in the following sense: there exists a constant C > 0 such that T satisfies

$$|T(f+g)(x)| \le C(|Tf(x)|+|Tg(x)|)$$

for almost every x. The theorem holds precisely as stated, except with γ replaced by

$$\gamma=2C\left(\frac{r(q-p)}{(r-p)(q-r)}\right)^{1/r}.$$

An operator T (possibly quasilinear) satisfying an estimate of the form

$$\|Tf\|_{q,w}\le C\|f\|_p$$

is said to be of weak type (p,q). An operator is simply of type (p,q) if T is a bounded transformation from L^{p} to L^{q}:

$$\|Tf\|_q\le C\|f\|_p.$$

A more general formulation of the interpolation theorem is as follows:

- If T is a quasilinear operator of weak type (p_{0}, q_{0}) and of weak type (p_{1}, q_{1}) where q_{0} ≠ q_{1}, then for each θ ∈ (0,1), T is of type (p,q), for p and q with p ≤ q of the form

$$\frac{1}{p} = \frac{1-\theta}{p_0}+\frac{\theta}{p_1},\quad \frac{1}{q} = \frac{1-\theta}{q_0} + \frac{\theta}{q_1}.$$

The latter formulation follows from the former through an application of Hölder's inequality and a duality argument.

== Applications and examples ==
A famous application example is the Hilbert transform. Viewed as a multiplier, the Hilbert transform of a function f can be computed by first taking the Fourier transform of f, then multiplying by the sign function, and finally applying the inverse Fourier transform.

Hence Parseval's theorem easily shows that the Hilbert transform is bounded from $L^2$ to $L^2$. A much less obvious fact is that it is bounded from $L^1$ to $L^{1,w}$. Hence Marcinkiewicz's theorem shows that it is bounded from $L^p$ to $L^p$ for any 1 < p < 2. Duality arguments show that it is also bounded for 2 < p < ∞. In fact, the Hilbert transform is really unbounded for p equal to 1 or ∞.

Another famous example is the Hardy–Littlewood maximal function, which is only sublinear operator rather than linear. While $L^p$ to $L^p$ bounds can be derived immediately from the $L^1$ to weak $L^1$ estimate by a clever change of variables, Marcinkiewicz interpolation is a more intuitive approach. Since the Hardy–Littlewood Maximal Function is trivially bounded from $L^\infty$ to $L^\infty$, strong boundedness for all $p>1$ follows immediately from the weak (1,1) estimate and interpolation. The weak (1,1) estimate can be obtained from the Vitali covering lemma.

== History ==
The theorem was first announced by Marcinkiewicz (1939), who showed this result to Antoni Zygmund shortly before he died in World War II. The theorem was almost forgotten by Zygmund, and was absent from his original works on the theory of singular integral operators. Later Zygmund (1956) realized that Marcinkiewicz's result could greatly simplify his work, at which time he published his former student's theorem together with a generalization of his own.

In 1964 Richard A. Hunt and Guido Weiss published a new proof of the Marcinkiewicz interpolation theorem.

== See also ==
- Interpolation space
