= Fatou's theorem =

Theorem in complex analysis

In mathematics, specifically in complex analysis, Fatou's theorem, named after Pierre Fatou, is a statement concerning holomorphic functions on the unit disk and their pointwise extension to the boundary of the disk.

== Motivation and statement of theorem ==
If we have a holomorphic function $f$ defined on the open unit disk $\mathbb{D}=\{z:|z|<1\}$, it is reasonable to ask under what conditions we can extend this function to the boundary of the unit disk. To do this, we can look at what the function looks like on each circle inside the disk centered at 0, each with some radius $r$. This defines a new function:

$$\begin{cases} f_r:S^1 \to \Complex \\ f_{r}(e^{i\theta})=f(re^{i\theta}) \end{cases}$$

where

$$S^1:=\{e^{i\theta}:\theta\in[0,2\pi]\}=\{z\in \Complex:|z|=1\},$$

is the unit circle. Then it would be expected that the values of the extension of $f$ onto the circle should be the limit of these functions, and so the question reduces to determining when $f_r$ converges, and in what sense, as $r\to 1$, and how well defined is this limit. In particular, if the $L^p$ norms of these $f_r$ are well behaved, we have an answer:

Theorem. Let $f:\mathbb{D}\to\Complex$ be a holomorphic function such that

$$\sup_{0<r<1}\| f_r\|_{L^p(S^{1})}<\infty,$$

where $f_r$ are defined as above. Then $f_r$ converges to some function $f_1\in L^p(S^{1})$ pointwise almost everywhere and in $L^p$ norm. That is,

$$\begin{align}
\left |f_r(e^{i\theta})-f_{1}(e^{i\theta}) \right | &\to 0 && \text{for almost every } \theta\in [0,2\pi] \\
\|f_r-f_1\|_{L^p(S^1)} &\to 0
\end{align}$$

Now, notice that this pointwise limit is a radial limit. That is, the limit being taken is along a straight line from the center of the disk to the boundary of the circle, and the statement above hence says that

$$f(re^{i\theta})\to f_1(e^{i\theta}) \qquad \text{for almost every } \theta.$$

The natural question is, with this boundary function defined, will we converge pointwise to this function by taking a limit in any other way? That is, suppose instead of following a straight line to the boundary, we follow an arbitrary curve $\gamma:[0,1)\to \mathbb{D}$ converging to some point $e^{i\theta}$ on the boundary. Will $f$ converge to $f_{1}(e^{i\theta})$? (Note that the above theorem is just the special case of $\gamma(t)=te^{i\theta}$). It turns out that the curve $\gamma$ needs to be non-tangential, meaning that the curve does not approach its target on the boundary in a way that makes it tangent to the boundary of the circle. In other words, the range of $\gamma$ must be contained in a wedge emanating from the limit point. We summarize as follows:

Definition. Let $\gamma:[0,1)\to \mathbb{D}$ be a continuous path such that $\lim\nolimits_{t\to 1}\gamma(t)=e^{i\theta}\in S^{1}$. Define

$$\begin{align}
\Gamma_\alpha &=\{z:\arg z\in [\pi-\alpha,\pi+\alpha]\} \\
\Gamma_\alpha(\theta) &=\mathbb{D}\cap e^{i\theta}(\Gamma_\alpha+1)
\end{align}$$

That is, $\Gamma_\alpha(\theta)$ is the wedge inside the disk with angle $2\alpha$ whose axis passes between $e^{i\theta}$ and zero. We say that $\gamma$ converges non-tangentially to $e^{i\theta}$, or that it is a non-tangential limit, if there exists $0<\alpha<\tfrac{\pi}{2}$ such that $\gamma$ is contained in $\Gamma_\alpha(\theta)$ and $\lim\nolimits_{t\to 1}\gamma(t)=e^{i\theta}$.

Fatou's Theorem. Let $f\in H^p(\mathbb{D}).$ Then for almost all $\theta\in[0,2\pi],$

$$\lim_{t\to 1}f(\gamma(t))=f_1(e^{i\theta})$$

for every non-tangential limit $\gamma$ converging to $e^{i\theta},$ where $f_1$ is defined as above.

Here, $H^p(\mathbb{D})$ is the Hardy space.

== Discussion ==
- The proof utilizes the symmetry of the Poisson kernel using the Hardy–Littlewood maximal function for the circle.
- The analogous theorem is frequently defined for the Hardy space over the upper-half plane and is proved in much the same way.

== See also ==
- Hardy space
