= Maximal ergodic theorem =

The maximal ergodic theorem is a theorem in ergodic theory, a discipline within mathematics.

Suppose that $(X, \mathcal{B},\mu)$ is a probability space, that $T : X\to X$ is a (possibly noninvertible) measure-preserving transformation, and that $f\in L^1(\mu,\mathbb{R})$. Define $f^*$ by

$$f^* = \sup_{N\geq 1} \frac{1}{N} \sum_{i=0}^{N-1} f \circ T^i.$$

Then the maximal ergodic theorem states that

$$\int_{f^{*} > \lambda} f \, d\mu \ge \lambda \cdot \mu\{ f^{*} > \lambda\}$$

for any λ ∈ R.

This theorem is used to prove the point-wise ergodic theorem.
