= Hardy–Littlewood maximal function =

Mathematical operator in real and harmonic analysis

In mathematics, the Hardy–Littlewood maximal operator M is a significant non-linear operator used in real analysis and harmonic analysis.

== Definition ==
The operator takes a locally integrable function $f: \R^d \to \mathbb C$ and returns another function $Mf : \R^d \to [0, \infty]$, where $Mf (x)$ is the supremum of the average of $f$ among all possible balls centered on $x$. Formally,

$$Mf(x)=\sup_{r>0} \frac{1}{|B(x, r)|}\int_{B(x, r)} |f(y)|\, dy$$,

where |E| denotes the d-dimensional Lebesgue measure of a subset E ⊂ R^{d}, and $B(x,\,r)$ is the ball of radius, $r>0$, centered at the point $x\in\mathbb{R}^d$.

Since $f$ is locally integrable, the averages are jointly continuous in x and r, so the maximal function Mf, being the supremum over r > 0, is measurable.

A nontrivial corollary of the Hardy–Littlewood maximal inequality states that $Mf$ is finite almost everywhere for functions in $L^1$.

== Hardy–Littlewood maximal inequality ==
This theorem of G. H. Hardy and J. E. Littlewood states that M is bounded as a sublinear operator from L^{p}(R^{d}) to itself for p > 1. That is, if f ∈ L^{p}(R^{d}) then the maximal function Mf is weak L^{1}-bounded and Mf ∈ L^{p}(R^{d}). Before stating the theorem more precisely, for simplicity, let {f > t} denote the set {x | f(x) > t}. Now we have:

Theorem (Weak Type Estimate). For d ≥ 1, there is a constant C_{d} > 0 such that for all λ > 0 and f ∈ L^{1}(R^{d}), we have:

$$\left |\{Mf > \lambda\} \right |< \frac{C_d}{\lambda} \Vert f\Vert_{L^1 (\mathbf{R}^d)}.$$

With the Hardy–Littlewood maximal inequality in hand, the following strong-type estimate is an immediate consequence of the Marcinkiewicz interpolation theorem:

Theorem (Strong Type Estimate). For d ≥ 1, 1 < p ≤ ∞, and f ∈ L^{p}(R^{d}),

there is a constant C_{p,d} > 0 such that

$$\Vert Mf\Vert_{L^p (\mathbf{R}^d)}\leq C_{p,d}\Vert f\Vert_{L^p(\mathbf{R}^d)}.$$

In the strong type estimate the best bounds for C_{p,d} are unknown. However subsequently Elias M. Stein used the Calderón-Zygmund method of rotations to prove the following:

Theorem (Dimension Independence). For 1 < p ≤ ∞ one can pick C_{p,d} = C_{p} independent of d.

== Proof ==
While there are several proofs of this theorem, a common one is given below, that uses the following version of the Vitali covering lemma to prove the weak-type estimate. (See the article for the proof of the lemma.)

Lemma—Let X be a separable metric space and $\mathcal{F}$ a family of open balls with bounded diameter. Then $\mathcal{F}$ has a countable subfamily $\mathcal{F}'$ consisting of disjoint balls such that

$$\bigcup_{B \in \mathcal{F}} B \subset \bigcup_{B \in \mathcal{F'}} 5B$$

where 5B is B with 5 times radius.

Proof of weak-type estimate

For p = ∞, the inequality is trivial (since the average of a function is no larger than its essential supremum). For 1≤ p < ∞, we use the lemma.

For every x such that Mf(x) > t, by definition, we can find a ball B_{x} centered at x such that

$$\int_{B_x} |f|dy > t|B_x|.$$

Thus {Mf > t} is a subset of the union of such balls, as x varies in {Mf > t}. This is trivial since x is contained in B_{x}. By the lemma, we can find, among such balls, a sequence of disjoint balls B_{j} such that the union of 5B_{j} covers {Mf > t}. It follows:

$$|\{Mf > t\}| \le 5^d \sum_j |B_j| \le {5^d \over t} \int |f|dy.$$

This completes the proof of the weak-type estimate.

The L^{p} bounds for p > 1 can be deduced from the weak $L^1$ bound by the Marcinkiewicz interpolation theorem. Here is how the argument goes in this particular case. Define the function $f_t \colon \mathbb{R}^d \to \mathbb{C}$ by $f_t (x) = f(x)$ if $|f(x)| > t/2$ and 0 otherwise. We have then

$$|f(x)| \le |f_t (x)| + \frac{t}{2}$$

and, by the definition of maximal function $Mf$

$$M f (x) \le Mf_t (x) + \frac{t}{2}$$

By the weak-type estimate applied to $f_t$, we have:

$$|\{Mf > t\}| \le |\{Mf_t > t/2\}|
\le \frac{2 \cdot 5^d}{t} \int_{\mathbb{R}^d} |f_t (x)|dx
= \frac{2 \cdot 5^d}{t} \int_{|f(x)| > \frac{t}{2}} |f(x)|dx.$$

Then

$$\|Mf\|_p^p = \int_{\mathbb{R}^d} \vert M f (x)\vert^p dx =  \int_{\mathbb{R}^d} \int_0^{Mf(x)} pt^{p-1} dt dx = p \int_0^\infty t^{p-1} |\{ Mf > t \}|  dt$$

By the estimate above we have:

$$\|Mf\|_p^p \leq  p \int_0^\infty t^{p-1} \left ({2\cdot 5^d \over t} \int_{|f(x)| > \frac{t}{2}} |f(x)|dx \right ) dt = 2\cdot 5^d p \int_{\mathbb{R}^d} \int_{0}^{2|f(x)|} t^{p-2} dt |f(x)| dx = \frac{2^p \cdot 5^d p}{p - 1} \|f\|_p^p.$$

Note that the constant $C=5^d$ in the proof can be improved to $3^d$ by using the inner regularity of the Lebesgue measure, and the finite version of the Vitali covering lemma. See the Discussion section below for more about optimizing the constant.

== Applications ==
Some applications of the Hardy–Littlewood Maximal Inequality include proving the following results:

- Lebesgue differentiation theorem
- Rademacher differentiation theorem
- Fatou's theorem on nontangential convergence.
- Fractional integration theorem

Here we use a standard trick involving the maximal function to give a quick proof of Lebesgue differentiation theorem. (But remember that in the proof of the maximal theorem, we used the Vitali covering lemma.) Let f ∈ L^{1}(R^{n}) and

$$\Omega f (x) = \limsup_{r \to 0} f_r(x) - \liminf_{r \to 0} f_r(x)$$

where

$$f_r(x) = \frac{1}{|B(x, r)|} \int_{B(x, r)} f(y) dy.$$

We write f = h + g where h is continuous and has compact support and g ∈ L^{1}(R^{n}) with norm that can be made arbitrary small. Then

$$\Omega f \le \Omega g + \Omega h = \Omega g$$

by continuity. Now, Ωg ≤ 2Mg and so, by the theorem, we have:

$$\left | \{ \Omega g > \varepsilon \} \right | \le \frac{2\,M}{\varepsilon} \|g\|_1$$

Now, we can let $\|g\|_1 \to 0$ and conclude Ωf = 0 almost everywhere; that is, $\lim_{r \to 0} f_r(x)$ exists for almost all x. It remains to show the limit actually equals f(x). But this is easy: it is known that $\|f_r - f\|_1 \to 0$ (approximation of the identity) and thus there is a subsequence $f_{r_k} \to f$ almost everywhere. By the uniqueness of limit, f_{r} → f almost everywhere then.

== Discussion ==
It is still unknown what the smallest constants C_{p,d} and C_{d} are in the above inequalities. However, a result of Elias Stein about spherical maximal functions can be used to show that, for 1 < p < ∞, we can remove the dependence of C_{p,d} on the dimension, that is, C_{p,d} = C_{p} for some constant C_{p} > 0 only depending on p. It is unknown whether there is a weak bound that is independent of dimension.

There are several common variants of the Hardy-Littlewood maximal operator which replace the averages over centered balls with averages over different families of sets. For instance, one can define the uncentered HL maximal operator (using the notation of Stein-Shakarchi)

$$f^*(x) = \sup_{x \in B_x} \frac{1}{|B_x|} \int_{B_x} |f(y)| dy$$

where the balls B_{x} are required to merely contain x, rather than be centered at x. There is also the dyadic HL maximal operator

$$M_\Delta f(x) = \sup_{x \in Q_x} \frac{1}{|Q_x|} \int_{Q_x} |f(y)| dy$$

where Q_{x} ranges over all dyadic cubes containing the point x. Both of these operators satisfy the HL maximal inequality.

== See also ==
- Rising sun lemma
