= Locally integrable function =

Function which is integrable on its domain

In mathematics, a locally integrable function (sometimes also called locally summable function) is a function which is integrable (so its integral is finite) on every compact subset of its domain of definition. The importance of such functions lies in the fact that their function space is similar to p-integrable function spaces ($L^p$ spaces), but its members are not required to satisfy any growth restriction on their behaviour at the boundary of their domain (at infinity if the domain is unbounded): in other words, locally integrable functions can grow arbitrarily fast at the domain boundary, but are still manageable in a way similar to ordinary integrable functions.

== Definition ==
=== Standard definition ===
Definition 1. Let $\Omega$ be an open set in the Euclidean space $\mathbb{R}^n$ and $f:\Omega\to\Bbb C$ be a Lebesgue measurable function. If $f$ on $\Omega$ is such that

$$\int_K | f |\, \mathrm{d}x <+\infty,$$

i.e. $f$ is Lebesgue integrable on all compact subsets $K$ of $\Omega$, then $f$ is called locally integrable. The set of all such functions is denoted by $L_{1,\text{loc}}(\Omega)$:

$$L_{1,\mathrm{loc}}(\Omega)=\bigl\{f\colon \Omega\to\mathbb{C}\text{ measurable} : f|_K \in L_1(K)\ \forall\, K \subset \Omega,\, K \text{ compact}\bigr\},$$

where $\left.f\right|_K$ denotes the restriction of $f$ to the set $K$.

=== An alternative definition ===
Definition 2. Let $\Omega$ be an open set in the Euclidean space $\mathbb{R}^n$. Then a function $f:\Omega\to \mathbb{C}$ such that

$$\int_\Omega | f \varphi|\, \mathrm{d}x <+\infty,$$

for each test function $\varphi\in C_c^\infty(\Omega)$ is called locally integrable, and the set of such functions is denoted by $L_{1,\text{loc}}(\Omega)$. Here, $C_c^\infty(\Omega)$ denotes the set of all infinitely differentiable functions $\varphi\colon\Omega\to\Bbb R$ with compact support contained in $\Omega$.

This definition has its roots in the approach to measure and integration theory based on the concept of a continuous linear functional on a topological vector space, developed by the Nicolas Bourbaki school. It is also the one adopted by Strichartz (2003) and by Maz'ya & Shaposhnikova (2009, p. 34). This "distribution theoretic" definition is equivalent to the standard one, as the following lemma proves:

Lemma 1. A given function $f:\Omega\to \mathbb{C}$ is locally integrable according to Definition 1 if and only if it is locally integrable according to Definition 2, i.e.,

$$\int_K | f |\, \mathrm{d}x <+\infty \quad \forall\, K \subset \Omega,\, K \text{ compact} \quad \Longleftrightarrow \quad
\int_\Omega | f \varphi|\, \mathrm{d}x <+\infty \quad \forall\, \varphi \in C^\infty_{\mathrm{c}}(\Omega).$$

Proof of Lemma 1

Only if part: Let $\varphi\in C_c^\infty(\Omega)$ be a test function. It is bounded by its supremum norm $\lVert\varphi\rVert_\infty$, measurable, and has a compact support, let's call it $K$. Hence,

$$\int_\Omega | f \varphi|\, \mathrm{d}x = \int_K |f|\,|\varphi|\, \mathrm{d}x \le\|\varphi\|_\infty\int_K | f |\, \mathrm{d}x<\infty$$

by Definition 1.

If part: Let $K$ be a compact subset of the open set $\Omega$. We will first construct a test function $\varphi_K\in C_c^\infty(\Omega)$ which majorises the indicator function $\chi_K$ of $K$. The usual set distance between $K$ and the boundary $\partial\Omega$ is strictly greater than zero, i.e.,

$$\Delta:=d(K,\partial\Omega)>0,$$

hence it is possible to choose a real number $\delta$ such that $\Delta >2\delta>0$ (if $\partial\Omega$ is the empty set, take $\Delta =\infty$). Let $K_\delta$ and $K_{2\delta}$ denote the closed $\delta$-neighborhood and $2\delta$-neighborhood of $K$, respectively. They are likewise compact and satisfy

$$K\subset K_\delta\subset K_{2\delta}\subset\Omega,\qquad d(K_\delta,\partial\Omega)=\Delta-\delta>\delta>0.$$

Now use convolution to define the function $\varphi_K : \Omega\to \mathbb{R}$ by

$$\varphi_K(x)={\chi_{K_\delta}\ast\varphi_\delta(x)}=
\int_{\mathbb{R}^n}\chi_{K_\delta}(y)\,\varphi_\delta(x-y)\,\mathrm{d}y,$$

where $\varphi_\delta$ is a mollifier constructed by using the standard positive symmetric one. Obviously $\varphi_K$ is non-negative in the sense that $\varphi_K \ge 0$, infinitely differentiable, and its support is contained in $K_{2\delta}$. In particular, it is a test function. Since $\varphi_K(x)=1$ for all $x\in K$, we have that $\chi_K \le \varphi_K$.

Let $f$ be a locally integrable function according to Definition 2. Then

$$\int_K|f|\,\mathrm{d}x=\int_\Omega|f|\chi_K\,\mathrm{d}x
\le\int_\Omega|f|\varphi_K\,\mathrm{d}x<\infty.$$

Since this holds for every compact subset $K$ of $\Omega$, the function $f$ is locally integrable according to Definition 1. □

=== General definition of local integrability on a generalized measure space ===
The classical Definition 1 of a locally integrable function involves only measure theoretic and topological concepts and thus can be carried over to abstract complex-valued functions on a topological measure space $(X, \Sigma, \mu)$. Nevertheless, the concept of a locally integrable function can be defined even on a generalised measure space $(X, \mathcal C, \mu)$, where $\mathcal C$ is no longer required to be a sigma-algebra but only a ring of sets and, notably, $X$ does not need to carry the structure of a topological space.

Definition 1A. Let $(X, \mathcal C, \mu)$ be an ordered triple where $X$ is a nonempty set, $\mathcal C$ is a ring of sets, and $\mu$ is a positive measure on $\mathcal C$. Moreover, let $f$ be a function from $X$ to a Banach space $B$ or to the extended real number line $\overline\mathbb{R}$. Then $f$ is said to be locally integrable with respect to $\mu$ if for every set $K\in \mathcal C$, the function $f\cdot \chi_K$ is integrable with respect to $\mu$.

The equivalence of Definition 1 and Definition 1A when $X$ is a topological space can be proven by constructing a ring of sets $\mathcal C$ from the set $\mathcal K$ of compact subsets of $X$ by the following steps.

1. It is evident that $\emptyset\in\mathcal K$ and, moreover, the operations of union $\cup$ and intersection $\cap$ make $\mathcal K$ a lattice with least upper bound $\vee\equiv\cup$ and greatest lower bound $\wedge\equiv\cap$.
2. The class of sets $\mathcal D$ defined as $\mathcal D \triangleq \{A\setminus B\mid A,B \in \mathcal K\}$ is a semiring of sets such that $\mathcal D\supset \mathcal K$ because of the condition $\emptyset\in\mathcal K$.
3. The class of sets $\mathcal C$ defined as $\mathcal C \triangleq \{ \cup_{i=1}^n A_i\mid A_i\in \mathcal D \text{ and } A_i\cap A_j=\emptyset\text{ if }i\neq j\}$, i.e., the class formed by finite unions of pairwise disjoint sets of $\mathcal D$, is a ring of sets, precisely the minimal one generated by $\mathcal K$.

By means of this abstract framework, Dinculeanu (1966, pp. 163–188) lists and proves several properties of locally integrable functions. Nevertheless, even if working in this more general framework is possible without any need of defining a topological structure, all the definitions and properties presented in the following sections deal explicitly only with this latter important case, since the most common applications of such functions are to distribution theory on Euclidean spaces, and thus their domain are invariably subsets of a topological space.

=== Generalization: locally p-integrable functions ===
Definition 3. Let $\Omega$ be an open set in the Euclidean space $\mathbb{R}^n$ and $f : \Omega\to\mathbb{C}$ be a Lebesgue measurable function. If, for a given $p$ with $1\le p\le+\infty$, $f$ satisfies

$$\int_K | f|^p \,\mathrm{d}x <+\infty,$$

i.e., it belongs to $L_p(K)$ for all compact subsets $K$ of $\Omega$, then $f$ is called locally $p$-integrable or also $p$-locally integrable. The set of all such functions is denoted by $L_{p,\text{loc}}(\Omega)$:

$$L_{p,\mathrm{loc}}(\Omega)=\left\{f:\Omega\to\mathbb{C}\text{ measurable }\left|\ f|_K \in L_p(K),\ \forall\, K \subset \Omega, K \text{ compact}\right.\right\}.$$

An alternative definition, completely analogous to the one given for locally integrable functions, can also be given for locally $p$-integrable functions: it can also be and proven equivalent to the one in this section. Despite their apparent higher generality, locally $p$-integrable functions form a subset of locally integrable functions for every $p$ such that $1 <p \le +\infty$.

=== Notation ===
Apart from the different glyphs which may be used for the uppercase "L", there are few variants for the notation of the set of locally integrable functions

- $L^p_{\mathrm{loc}}(\Omega),$ adopted by Hörmander (1990, p. 37), Strichartz (2003, pp. 12–13) and (Vladimirov 2002, p. 3).
- $L_{p,\mathrm{loc}}(\Omega),$ adopted by Maz'ya & Poborchi (1997, p. 4) and Maz'ya & Shaposhnikova (2009, p. 44).
- $L_p(\Omega,\mathrm{loc}),$ adopted by Maz'ja (1985, p. 6) and Maz'ya (2011, p. 2).

== Properties ==
=== L_{p,loc} is a complete metric space for all p ≥ 1 ===
Theorem 1. $L_{p,\text{loc}}$ is a complete metrizable space: its topology can be generated by the following metric:

$$d(u,v)=\sum_{k\geq 1}\frac{1}{2^k}\frac{\Vert u - v\Vert_{p,\omega_k}}{1+\Vert u - v\Vert_{p,\omega_k}}\qquad u, v\in L_{p,\mathrm{loc}}(\Omega),$$

where $\{\omega_k\}_{k\ge 1}$ is a family of non empty open sets such that

- $\omega_k\Subset \omega_{k+ 1}$, meaning that $\omega_k$ is compactly contained in $\omega_{k+ 1}$ i.e. each of them is a set whose closure is compact and strictly included in the set of higher index.
- $\cup_{k}\omega_k= \Omega$ and finally
- ${\Vert\cdot\Vert}_{p,\omega_k}\to\mathbb{R}^+$, $k\in \mathbb{N}$ is an indexed family of seminorms, defined as

$${\Vert u \Vert}_{p,\omega_k} = \left (\int_{\omega_k} | u(x)|^p \,\mathrm{d}x\right)^{1/p}\qquad\forall\, u\in L_{p,\mathrm{loc}}(\Omega).$$

In (Gilbarg & Trudinger 2001, p. 147), (Maz'ya & Poborchi 1997, p. 5), (Maz'ja 1985, p. 6) and (Maz'ya 2011, p. 2), this theorem is stated but not proved on a formal basis: a complete proof of a more general result, which includes it, can be found in (Meise & Vogt 1997, p. 40).

=== L_{p} is a subspace of L_{1,loc} for all p ≥ 1 ===
Theorem 2. Every function $f$ belonging to $L_{p,\text{loc}}(\Omega)$, $1\le p\le+\infty$, where $\Omega$ is an open subset of $\mathbb{R}^n$, is locally integrable.

Proof. The case $p=1$ is trivial, therefore in the sequel of the proof it is assumed that $1< p\le+\infty$. Consider the characteristic function $\chi_K$ of a compact subset $K$ of $\Omega$: then, for $p\le+\infty$,

$$\left|{\int_\Omega|\chi_K|^q\,\mathrm{d}x}\right|^{1/q}=\left|{\int_K \mathrm{d}x}\right|^{1/q}=|K|^{1/q}<+\infty,$$

where

- $q$ is a positive number such that $1 / p +1 /q =1$ for a given $1\le p\le+\infty$,
- $\vert K\vert$ is the Lebesgue measure of the compact set $K$.

Then for any $f$ belonging to $L_{p}(\Omega)$ the product by $f\chi_K$ is integrable by Hölder's inequality i.e. belongs to $L_{1}(\Omega)$ and

$${\int_K|f|\,\mathrm{d}x}={\int_\Omega|f\chi_K|\,\mathrm{d}x}\leq\left|{\int_\Omega|f|^p\,\mathrm{d}x}\right|^{1/p}\left|{\int_K \mathrm{d}x}\right|^{1/q}=\|f\|_p|K|^{1/q}<+\infty,$$

therefore

$$f\in L_{1,\mathrm{loc}}(\Omega).$$

Note that since the following inequality is true

$${\int_K|f|\,\mathrm{d}x}={\int_\Omega|f\chi_K|\,\mathrm{d}x}\leq\left|{\int_K|f|^p \,\mathrm{d}x}\right|^{1/p}\left|{\int_K \mathrm{d}x}\right|^{1/q}=\|f \chi_K\|_p|K|^{1/q}<+\infty,$$

the theorem is true also for functions $f$ belonging only to the space of locally $p$-integrable functions, therefore the theorem implies also the following result.

Corollary 1. Every function $f$ in $L_{p,\text{loc}}(\Omega)$, $1<p\leq+\infty$, is locally integrable, i. e. belongs to $> L_{1,\text{loc}}(\Omega)$.

Note: If $\Omega$ is an open subset of $\mathbb{R}^n$ that is also bounded, then one has the standard inclusion $L_p(\Omega) \subset L_1(\Omega)$ which makes sense given the above inclusion $L_1(\Omega)\subset L_{1,\text{loc}}(\Omega)$. But the first of these statements is not true if $\Omega$ is not bounded; then it is still true that $L_p(\Omega) \subset L_{1,\text{loc}}(\Omega)$ for any $p$, but not that $L_p(\Omega)\subset L_1(\Omega)$. To see this, one typically considers the function $u(x)=1$, which is in $L_{\infty}(\mathbb{R}^n)$ but not in $L_p(\mathbb{R}^n)$ for any finite $p$.

=== L_{1,loc} is the space of densities of absolutely continuous measures ===
Theorem 3. A function $f$ is the density of an absolutely continuous measure if and only if $f\in L_{1,\text{loc}}$.

The proof of this result is sketched by (Schwartz 1998, p. 18). Rephrasing its statement, this theorem asserts that every locally integrable function defines an absolutely continuous measure and conversely that every absolutely continuous measures defines a locally integrable function: this is also, in the abstract measure theory framework, the form of the important Radon–Nikodym theorem given by Stanisław Saks in his treatise.

== Examples ==
- The constant function 1 defined on the real line is locally integrable but not globally integrable since the real line has infinite measure. More generally, constants, continuous functions and integrable functions are locally integrable.
- The function $f(x) = 1/x$ for $x \in (0, 1)$ is locally but not globally integrable on $(0, 1)$. It is locally integrable since any compact set $K \subset (0, 1)$ has positive distance from $0$ and $f$ is hence bounded on $K$. This example underpins the initial claim that locally integrable functions do not require the satisfaction of growth conditions near the boundary in bounded domains.
- The function

$$f(x)=
\begin{cases}
1/x &x\neq 0,\\
0 & x=0,
\end{cases} \quad x \in \mathbb R$$

is not locally integrable at $x= 0$: it is indeed locally integrable near this point since its integral over every compact set not including it is finite. Formally speaking, $1/x \in L_{1, \text{loc}}(\mathbb{R}\setminus 0)$: however, this function can be extended to a distribution on the whole $\mathbb{R}$ as a Cauchy principal value.

- The preceding example raises a question: does every function which is locally integrable in $\Omega\subsetneq \mathbb{R}$ admit an extension to the whole $\mathbb{R}$ as a distribution? The answer is negative, and a counterexample is provided by the following function:

$$f(x)=
\begin{cases}
e^{1/x} &x\neq 0,\\
0 & x=0,
\end{cases}$$

does not define any distribution on $\mathbb{R}$.

- The following example, similar to the preceding one, is a function belonging to $L_{1,\text{loc}}(\mathbb{R} \setminus 0)$ which serves as an elementary counterexample in the application of the theory of distributions to differential operators with irregular singular coefficients:

$$f(x)=
\begin{cases}
k_1 e^{1/x^2} &x>0,\\
0 & x=0,\\
k_2 e^{1/x^2} &x<0,
\end{cases}$$

where $k_1$ and $k_2$ are complex constants, is a general solution of the following elementary non-Fuchsian differential equation of first order

$$x^3\frac{\mathrm{d}f}{\mathrm{d}x}+2f=0.$$

Again it does not define any distribution on the whole $\mathbb{R}$, if $k_1$ or $k_2$ are not zero: the only distributional global solution of such equation is therefore the zero distribution, and this shows how, in this branch of the theory of differential equations, the methods of the theory of distributions cannot be expected to have the same success achieved in other branches of the same theory, notably in the theory of linear differential equations with constant coefficients.

== Applications ==
Locally integrable functions play a prominent role in distribution theory and they occur in the definition of various classes of functions and function spaces, like functions of bounded variation. Moreover, they appear in the Radon–Nikodym theorem by characterizing the absolutely continuous part of every measure.

== See also ==
- Compact set
- Distribution (mathematics)
- Lebesgue's density theorem
- Lebesgue differentiation theorem
- Lebesgue integral
- Lp space
