= Vitali covering lemma =

Combinatorial and geometric result used in measure theory of Euclidean spaces

In mathematics, the Vitali covering lemma is a combinatorial and geometric result commonly used in measure theory of Euclidean spaces. This lemma is an intermediate step, of independent interest, in the proof of the Vitali covering theorem. The covering theorem is credited to the Italian mathematician Giuseppe Vitali. The theorem states that it is possible to cover, up to a Lebesgue-negligible set, a given subset E of R^{d} by a disjoint family extracted from a Vitali covering of E.

== Vitali covering lemma ==
Visualization of the lemma in $\R^1$.

On the top: a collection of balls; the green balls are the disjoint subcollection. On the bottom: the subcollection with three times the radius covers all the balls.

There are two basic versions of the lemma, a finite version and an infinite version. Both lemmas can be proved in the general setting of a metric space, typically these results are applied to the special case of the Euclidean space $\mathbb{R}^d$. In both theorems we will use the following notation: if $B = B(x,r)$ is a ball and $c \geq 0$, we will write $cB$ for the ball $B(x,cr)$.

=== Finite version ===
Finite Covering Lemma—Let $B_{1}, \dots, B_{n}$ be any finite collection of balls contained in an arbitrary metric space. Then there exists a subcollection $B_{j_{1}}, B_{j_{2}}, \dots, B_{j_{m}}$ of these balls which are disjoint and satisfy
$$B_{1}\cup B_{2}\cup\dots \cup B_{n}\subseteq 3B_{j_1} \cup 3B_{j_2} \cup \dots \cup 3B_{j_m}.$$

A given ball $B_i$ (colored red) must intersect some selected balls (colored green). Of these, pick the green ball $B_{j_k}$ with the lowest index $k$. It must necessarily have radius $r(B_{j_k}) \geq r(B_i)$ by construction.

Proof

Without loss of generality, we assume that the collection of balls is not empty; that is, n > 0. Let $B_{j_1}$ be the ball of largest radius. Inductively, assume that $B_{j_1},\dots,B_{j_k}$ have been chosen. If there is some ball in $B_1,\dots,B_n$ that is disjoint from $B_{j_1}\cup B_{j_2}\cup\dots\cup B_{j_k}$, let $B_{j_{k+1}}$ be such ball with maximal radius (breaking ties arbitrarily), otherwise, we set m := k and terminate the inductive definition.

Now set $X:=\bigcup_{k=1}^m 3\,B_{j_k}$. It remains to show that $B_i\subset X$ for every $i=1,2,\dots,n$. This is clear if $i\in\{j_1,\dots,j_m\}$. Otherwise, there is necessarily some $k \in \{1,\dots,m\}$ such that $B_i$ intersects $B_{j_k}$. We choose the minimal possible $k$ and note that the radius of $B_{j_k}$ is at least as large as that of $B_i$. The triangle inequality then implies that $B_i\subset 3\,B_{j_k}\subset X$, as needed.

=== Infinite version ===
Infinite Covering Lemma—Let $\mathbf{F}$ be an arbitrary collection of non-degenerating balls in a separable metric space such that
$$R := \sup \, \{ \mathrm{rad}(B) : B \in \mathbf{F} \} <\infty$$
where $\mathrm{rad}(B)$ denotes the radius of the ball B. Then there exists a countable sub-collection $\mathbf{G} \subset \mathbf{F}$ such that the balls of $\mathbf{G}$ are pairwise disjoint, and satisfy
$$\bigcup_{B \in \mathbf{F}} B \subseteq \bigcup_{C \in \mathbf{G}} 5\,C.$$
Moreover, each $B \in \mathbf{F}$ intersects some $C \in \mathbf{G}$ with $B \subset 5C$.

The following proof is based on (Evans & Gariepy 1992, section 1.5.1).

Proof

Consider the partition of F into subcollections F_{n}, n ≥ 0, defined by

$\mathbf{F}_n = \{ B \in \mathbf{F} : 2^{-n-1}R < \text{rad}(B) \leq 2^{-n}R \}.$

That is, $\mathbf{F}_n$ consists of the balls B whose radius is in (2^{−n−1}R, 2^{−n}R]. A sequence G_{n}, with G_{n} ⊂ F_{n}, is defined inductively as follows. First, set H_{0} = F_{0} and let G_{0} be a maximal disjoint subcollection of H_{0} (such a subcollection exists by Zorn's lemma). Assuming that G_{0},...,G_{n} have been selected, let

$$\mathbf{H}_{n+1} = \{ B \in \mathbf{F}_{n+1} : \ B \cap C = \emptyset, \ \ \forall C \in \mathbf{G}_0 \cup \mathbf{G}_1 \cup \dots \cup \mathbf{G}_n \},$$

and let G_{n+1} be a maximal disjoint subcollection of H_{n+1}. The subcollection

$$\mathbf{G} := \bigcup_{n=0}^\infty \mathbf{G}_n$$

of F satisfies the requirements of the theorem: G is a disjoint collection, and is thus countable since the given metric space is separable. Moreover, every ball B ∈ F intersects a ball C ∈ G such that B ⊂ 5 C.
Indeed, if we are given some $B \in \mathbf{F}$, there must be some n be such that B belongs to F_{n}. Either B does not belong to H_{n}, which implies n > 0 and means that B intersects a ball from the union of G_{0}, ..., G_{n−1}, or B ∈ H_{n} and by maximality of G_{n}, B intersects a ball in G_{n}. In any case, B intersects a ball C that belongs to the union of G_{0}, ..., G_{n}. Such a ball C must have a radius larger than 2^{−n−1}R. Since the radius of B is less than or equal to 2^{−n}R, we can conclude by the triangle inequality that B ⊂ 5 C, as claimed. From this $\bigcup_{B \in \mathbf{F}} B \subseteq \bigcup_{C \in \mathbf{G}} 5\,C$ immediately follows.

Remarks

- In the infinite version, the initial collection of balls can be countable or uncountable. In a separable metric space, any pairwise disjoint collection of balls must be countable. In a non-separable space, the same argument shows a pairwise disjoint subfamily exists, but that family need not be countable.
- The result may fail if the radii are not bounded: consider the family of all balls centered at 0 in R^{d}; any disjoint subfamily consists of only one ball B, and 5 B does not contain all the balls in this family.
- The constant 5 is not optimal. If the scale c^{−n}, c > 1, is used instead of 2^{−n} for defining F_{n}, the final value is 1 + 2c instead of 5. Any constant larger than 3 gives a correct statement of the lemma, but not 3.
- Using a finer analysis, when the original collection F is a Vitali covering of a subset E of R^{d}, one shows that the subcollection G, defined in the above proof, covers E up to a Lebesgue-negligible set.

=== Applications and method of use ===
An application of the Vitali lemma is in proving the Hardy–Littlewood maximal inequality. As in this proof, the Vitali lemma is frequently used when we are, for instance, considering the d-dimensional Lebesgue measure, $\lambda_d$, of a set E ⊂ R^{d}, which we know is contained in the union of a certain collection of balls $\{B_{j}:j\in J\}$, each of which has a measure we can more easily compute, or has a special property one would like to exploit. Hence, if we compute the measure of this union, we will have an upper bound on the measure of E. However, it is difficult to compute the measure of the union of all these balls if they overlap. By the Vitali lemma, we may choose a subcollection $\left\{ B_{j} : j\in J' \right\}$ which is disjoint and such that $\bigcup_{j\in J'}5 B_j\supset \bigcup_{j\in J} B_j\supset E$. Therefore,

$$\lambda_d(E)\leq \lambda_d \biggl( \bigcup_{j\in J}B_{j} \biggr) \leq \lambda_d \biggl( \bigcup_{j\in J'}5B_{j} \biggr) \leq \sum_{j\in J'} \lambda_d(5 B_{j}).$$

Now, since increasing the radius of a d-dimensional ball by a factor of five increases its volume by a factor of 5^{d}, we know that

$$\sum_{j\in J'} \lambda_d(5B_{j}) = 5^d \sum_{j\in J'} \lambda_d(B_{j})$$

and thus

$$\lambda_d(E) \leq 5^{d} \sum_{j\in J'}\lambda_d(B_{j}).$$

== Vitali covering theorem ==
In the covering theorem, the aim is to cover, up to a "negligible set", a given set E ⊆ R^{d} by a disjoint subcollection extracted from a Vitali covering for E : a Vitali class or Vitali covering $\mathcal{V}$ for E is a collection of sets such that, for every x ∈ E and δ > 0, there is a set U in the collection $\mathcal{V}$ such that x ∈ U and the diameter of U is non-zero and less than δ.

In the classical setting of Vitali, the negligible set is a Lebesgue negligible set, but measures other than the Lebesgue measure, and spaces other than R^{d} have also been considered, as is shown in the relevant section below.

The following observation is useful: if $\mathcal{V}$ is a Vitali covering for E and if E is contained in an open set Ω ⊆ R^{d}, then the subcollection of sets U in $\mathcal{V}$ that are contained in Ω is also a Vitali covering for E.

=== Vitali's covering theorem for the Lebesgue measure ===
The next covering theorem for the Lebesgue measure λ_{d} is due to Lebesgue (1910). A collection $\mathcal{V}$ of measurable subsets of R^{d} is a regular family (in the sense of Lebesgue) if there exists a constant C such that

$$\operatorname{diam}(V)^d \le C \, \lambda_d(V)$$

for every set V in the collection $\mathcal{V}$.
The family of cubes is an example of regular family $\mathcal{V}$, as is the family $\mathcal{V}(m)$ of rectangles in R^{2} such that the ratio of sides stays between m^{−1} and m, for some fixed m ≥ 1. If an arbitrary norm is given on R^{d}, the family of balls for the metric associated to the norm is another example. To the contrary, the family of all rectangles in R^{2} is not regular.

Theorem— Let E ⊆ R^{d} be a measurable set with finite Lebesgue measure, and let $\mathcal{V}$ be a regular family of closed subsets of R^{d} that is a Vitali covering for E. Then there exists a finite or countably infinite disjoint subcollection $\{U_{j}\}\subseteq \mathcal{V}$ such that
$$\lambda_d \biggl( E \setminus \bigcup_{j}U_{j} \biggr) = 0.$$

The original result of Vitali (1908) is a special case of this theorem, in which d = 1 and $\mathcal{V}$ is a collection of intervals that is a Vitali covering for a measurable subset E of the real line having finite measure.
The theorem above remains true without assuming that E has finite measure. This is obtained by applying the covering result in the finite measure case, for every integer n ≥ 0, to the portion of E contained in the open annulus Ω_{n} of points x such that n < |x| < n+1.

A somewhat related covering theorem is the Besicovitch covering theorem. To each point a of a subset A ⊆ R^{d}, a Euclidean ball B(a, r_{a}) with center a and positive radius r_{a} is assigned. Then, as in the Vitali covering lemma, a subcollection of these balls is selected in order to cover A in a specific way. The main differences between the Besicovitch covering theorem and the Vitali covering lemma are that on one hand, the disjointness requirement of Vitali is relaxed to the fact that the number N_{x} of the selected balls containing an arbitrary point x ∈ R^{d} is bounded by a constant B_{d} depending only upon the dimension d; on the other hand, the selected balls do cover the set A of all the given centers.

=== Vitali's covering theorem for the Hausdorff measure ===
One may have a similar objective when considering Hausdorff measure instead of Lebesgue measure. The following theorem applies in that case.

Theorem— Let H^{s} denote s-dimensional Hausdorff measure, let E ⊆ R^{d} be an H^{s}-measurable set and $\mathcal{V}$ a Vitali class of closed sets for E. Then there exists a (finite or countably infinite) disjoint subcollection $\{U_{j}\}\subseteq \mathcal{V}$ such that either
$$H^{s} \left( E\setminus \bigcup_{j}U_{j} \right)=0$$
or
$$\sum_{j} \operatorname{diam} (U_{j})^{s}=\infty.$$

Furthermore, if E has finite s-dimensional Hausdorff measure, then for any ε > 0, we may choose this subcollection {U_{j}} such that

$$H^{s}(E)\leq \sum_{j} \mathrm{diam} (U_{j})^{s}+\varepsilon.$$

This theorem implies the result of Lebesgue given above. Indeed, when s = d, the Hausdorff measure H^{s} on R^{d} coincides with a multiple of the d-dimensional Lebesgue measure. If a disjoint collection $\{U_{j}\}$ is regular and contained in a measurable region B with finite Lebesgue measure, then

$$\sum_j \operatorname{diam}(U_j)^d \le C \sum_j \lambda_d(U_j) \le C \, \lambda_d(B) < +\infty$$

which excludes the second possibility in the first assertion of the previous theorem. It follows that E is covered, up to a Lebesgue-negligible set, by the selected disjoint subcollection.

=== From the covering lemma to the covering theorem ===
The covering lemma can be used as intermediate step in the proof of the following basic form of the Vitali covering theorem.

Theorem—For every subset E of R^{d} and every Vitali cover of E by a collection F of closed balls, there exists a disjoint subcollection G which covers E up to a Lebesgue-negligible set.

Proof: Without loss of generality, one can assume that all balls in F are nondegenerate and have radius less than or equal to 1. By the infinite form of the covering lemma, there exists a countable disjoint subcollection $\mathbf{G}$ of F such that every ball B ∈ F intersects a ball C ∈ G for which B ⊂ 5 C. Let r > 0 be given, and let Z denote the set of points z ∈ E that are not contained in any ball from G and belong to the open ball B(r) of radius r, centered at 0. It is enough to show that Z is Lebesgue-negligible, for every given r.

Let $\mathbf{G}_r = \{ C_n\}_{n}$ denote the subcollection of those balls in G that meet B(r). Note that $\mathbf{G}_r$ may be finite or countably infinite. Let z ∈ Z be fixed. For each N, z does not belong to the closed set $K = \bigcup_{n \leq N} C_n$ by the definition of Z. But by the Vitali cover property, one can find a ball B ∈ F containing z, contained in B(r), and disjoint from K. By the property of G, the ball B intersects some ball $C_i \in \mathbf{G}$ and is contained in $5C_i$. But because K and B are disjoint, we must have i > N. So $z \in 5C_i$ for some i > N, and therefore

$$Z \subset \bigcup_{n > N} 5C_n.$$

This gives for every N the inequality

$$\lambda_d(Z) \le \sum_{n > N} \lambda_d(5C_n) = 5^d \sum_{n > N} \lambda_d(C_n).$$

But since the balls of $\mathbf{G}_r$ are contained in B(r+2), and these balls are disjoint we see

$$\sum_n \lambda_d(C_n) < \infty.$$

Therefore, the term on the right side of the above inequality converges to 0 as N goes to infinity, which shows that Z is negligible as needed.

=== Infinite-dimensional spaces ===
The Vitali covering theorem is not valid in infinite-dimensional settings. The first result in this direction was given by David Preiss in 1979: there exists a Gaussian measure γ on an (infinite-dimensional) separable Hilbert space H so that the Vitali covering theorem fails for (H, Borel(H), γ). This result was strengthened in 2003 by Jaroslav Tišer: the Vitali covering theorem in fact fails for every infinite-dimensional Gaussian measure on any (infinite-dimensional) separable Hilbert space.

== See also ==
- Besicovitch covering theorem
