= Conformal welding =

Process in geometric function theory

In mathematics, conformal welding (sewing or gluing) is a process in geometric function theory for producing a Riemann surface by joining together two Riemann surfaces, each with a disk removed, along their boundary circles. This problem can be reduced to that of finding univalent holomorphic maps f, g of the unit disk and its complement into the extended complex plane, both admitting continuous extensions to the closure of their domains, such that the images are complementary Jordan domains and such that on the unit circle they differ by a given quasisymmetric homeomorphism. Several proofs are known using a variety of techniques, including the Beltrami equation, the Hilbert transform on the circle and elementary approximation techniques. Sharon & Mumford (2006) describe the first two methods of conformal welding as well as providing numerical computations and applications to the analysis of shapes in the plane.

== Welding using the Beltrami equation ==
This method was first proposed by Pfluger (1960).

If f is a diffeomorphism of the circle, the Alexander extension gives a way of extending f to a diffeomorphism of the unit disk D:

$$\displaystyle{F(r,\theta)=r \exp [i\psi(r)g(\theta) + i(1-\psi(r))\theta] ,}$$

where ψ is a smooth function with values in [0,1], equal to 0 near 0 and 1 near 1, and

$$\displaystyle{f(e^{i\theta})=e^{ig(\theta)},}$$

with g(θ + 2π) = g(θ) + 2π.

The extension F can be continued to any larger disk |z| < R with R > 1. Accordingly in the unit disc

$$\displaystyle{\|\mu\|_\infty < 1, \,\,\, \mu(z)=F_{\overline{z}}/F_z.}$$

Now extend μ to a Beltrami coefficient on the whole of C by setting it equal to 0 for |z| ≥ 1. Let G be the corresponding solution of the Beltrami equation:

$$\displaystyle{G_{\overline{z}}=\mu G_z.}$$

Let F_{1}(z) = G $\circ$ F^{−1}(z) for |z| ≤ 1 and F_{2}(z) = G (z) for |z| ≥ 1. Thus F_{1} and F_{2} are univalent holomorphic maps of |z| < 1 and |z| > 1 onto the inside and outside of a Jordan curve. They extend continuously to homeomorphisms f_{i} of the unit circle onto the Jordan curve on the boundary. By construction they satisfy the conformal welding condition:

$$\displaystyle{f=f_1^{-1}\circ f_2.}$$

== Welding using the Hilbert transform on the circle ==
The use of the Hilbert transform to establish conformal welding was first suggested by the Georgian mathematicians D.G. Mandzhavidze and B.V. Khvedelidze in 1958. A detailed account was given at the same time by F.D. Gakhov and presented in his classic monograph (Gakhov (1990)).

Let e_{n}(θ) = e^{inθ} be the standard orthonormal basis of L^{2}(T). Let H^{2}(T) be Hardy space, the closed subspace spanned by the e_{n} with n ≥ 0. Let P be the orthogonal projection onto Hardy space and set T = 2P - I. The operator H = iT is the Hilbert transform on the circle and can be written as a singular integral operator.

Given a diffeomorphism f of the unit circle, the task is to determine two univalent holomorphic functions

$$\displaystyle{f_-(z)=a_0 + a_1 z + a_2 z^2 + \cdots,\,\,\,\,\, f_+(z) =z + b_1z^{-1} +b_2z^{-2}+\cdots,}$$

defined in |z| < 1 and |z| > 1 and both extending smoothly to the unit circle, mapping onto a Jordan domain and its complement, such that

$$\displaystyle{f_-(e^{i\theta})=f_+(f(e^{i\theta})).}$$

Let F be the restriction of f_{+} to the unit circle. Then

$$\displaystyle{TF=-F + 2e^{i\theta}}$$

and

$$\displaystyle{TF\circ f= F\circ f.}$$

Hence

$$\displaystyle{T(F\circ f)\circ f^{-1} - T(F)= 2F-2e^{i\theta}.}$$

If V(f) denotes the bounded invertible operator on L^{2} induced by the diffeomorphism f, then the operator

$$\displaystyle{K_f=V(f)PV(f)^{-1} - P}$$

is compact, indeed it is given by an operator with smooth kernel because P and T are given by singular integral operators. The equation above then reduces to

$$\displaystyle{(I-K_f)F=e^{i\theta}.}$$

The operator I − K_{f} is a Fredholm operator of index zero. It has zero kernel and is therefore invertible. In fact an element in the kernel would consist of a pair of holomorphic functions on D and D^{c} which have smooth boundary values on the circle related by f. Since the holomorphic function on D^{c} vanishes at ∞, the positive powers of this pair also provide solutions, which are linearly independent, contradicting the fact that I − K_{f} is a Fredholm operator. The above equation therefore has a unique solution F which is smooth and from which f_{±} can be reconstructed by reversing the steps above. Indeed, by looking at the equation satisfied by the logarithm of the derivative of F, it follows that F has nowhere vanishing derivative on the unit circle. Moreover F is one-to-one on the circle since if it assumes the value a at different points z_{1} and z_{2} then the logarithm of R(z) = (F(z) − a)/(z - z_{1})(z − z_{2}) would satisfy an integral equation known to have no non-zero solutions. Given these properties on the unit circle, the required properties of f_{±} then follow from the argument principle.
