= Isothermal coordinates =

In mathematics, specifically in differential geometry, isothermal coordinates on a Riemannian manifold are local coordinates where the metric is conformal to the Euclidean metric. This means that in isothermal coordinates, the Riemannian metric locally has the form

$$g = \varphi (dx_1^2 + \cdots + dx_n^2),$$

where $\varphi$ is a positive smooth function. (If the Riemannian manifold is oriented, some authors insist that a coordinate system must agree with that orientation to be isothermal.)

Isothermal coordinates on surfaces were first introduced by Gauss. Korn and Lichtenstein proved that isothermal coordinates exist around any point on a two dimensional Riemannian manifold.

By contrast, most higher-dimensional manifolds do not admit isothermal coordinates anywhere; that is, they are not usually locally conformally flat. In dimension 3, a Riemannian metric is locally conformally flat if and only if its Cotton tensor vanishes. In dimensions greater than 3, a metric is locally conformally flat if and only if its Weyl tensor vanishes.

== Isothermal coordinates on surfaces ==
In 1822, Carl Friedrich Gauss proved the existence of isothermal coordinates on an arbitrary surface with a real-analytic Riemannian metric, following earlier results of Joseph Lagrange in the special case of surfaces of revolution. The construction used by Gauss made use of the Cauchy–Kowalevski theorem, so that his method is fundamentally restricted to the real-analytic context. Following innovations in the theory of two-dimensional partial differential equations by Arthur Korn, Leon Lichtenstein found in 1916 the general existence of isothermal coordinates for Riemannian metrics of lower regularity, including smooth metrics and even Hölder continuous metrics.

Given a Riemannian metric on a two-dimensional manifold, the transition function between isothermal coordinate charts, which is a map between open subsets of $\R^2$, is necessarily angle-preserving. The angle-preserving property together with orientation-preservation is one characterization (among many) of holomorphic functions, and so an oriented coordinate atlas consisting of isothermal coordinate charts may be viewed as a holomorphic coordinate atlas. This demonstrates that a Riemannian metric and an orientation on a two-dimensional manifold combine to induce the structure of a Riemann surface (i.e. a one-dimensional complex manifold). Furthermore, given an oriented surface, two Riemannian metrics induce the same holomorphic atlas if and only if they are conformal to one another. For this reason, the study of Riemann surfaces is identical to the study of conformal classes of Riemannian metrics on oriented surfaces.

By the 1950s, expositions of the ideas of Korn and Lichtenstein were put into the language of complex derivatives and the Beltrami equation by Lipman Bers and Shiing-shen Chern, among others. In this context, it is natural to investigate the existence of generalized solutions, which satisfy the relevant partial differential equations but are no longer interpretable as coordinate charts in the usual way. This was initiated by Charles Morrey in his seminal 1938 article on the theory of elliptic partial differential equations on two-dimensional domains, leading later to the measurable Riemann mapping theorem of Lars Ahlfors and Bers.

=== Beltrami equation ===
The existence of isothermal coordinates can be proved by applying known existence theorems for the Beltrami equation, which rely on L^{p} estimates for singular integral operators of Calderón and Zygmund. A simpler approach to the Beltrami equation has been given more recently by Adrien Douady.

If the Riemannian metric is given locally as

$$ds^2 = E \, dx^2 + 2F \, dx \, dy + G \, dy^2,$$

then in the complex coordinate $z = x + iy$, it takes the form

$$ds^2 = \lambda| \, dz +\mu \, d\overline{z}|^2,$$

where $\lambda$ and $\mu$ are smooth with $\lambda>0$ and $\left\vert \mu \right\vert < 1$. In fact

$$\lambda={1\over 4} ( E + G +2\sqrt{EG -F^2}),\,\,\,    {\displaystyle \mu ={(E-G+2iF) \over 4\lambda }}.$$

In isothermal coordinates $(u,v)$ the metric should take the form

$$ds^2 = e^{\rho} (du^2 + dv^2)$$

with ρ smooth. The complex coordinate $w = u + iv$ satisfies

$$e^{\rho} \, |dw|^2 = e^{\rho} |w_{z}|^2 | \, dz + {w_{\overline {z}}\over w_z} \, d\overline{z}|^2,$$

so that the coordinates (u, v) will be isothermal if the Beltrami equation

$${\partial w\over \partial \overline{z}} = \mu {\partial w\over \partial z}$$

has a diffeomorphic solution. Such a solution has been proved to exist in any neighbourhood where $\lVert \mu \rVert_\infty<1$.

=== Existence via local solvability for elliptic partial differential equations ===
The existence of isothermal coordinates on a smooth two-dimensional Riemannian manifold is a corollary of the standard local solvability result in the analysis of elliptic partial differential equations. In the present context, the relevant elliptic equation is the condition for a function to be harmonic relative to the Riemannian metric. The local solvability then states that any point p has a neighborhood U on which there is a harmonic function u with nowhere-vanishing derivative.

Isothermal coordinates are constructed from such a function in the following way. Harmonicity of u is identical to the closedness of the differential 1-form $\star du,$ defined using the Hodge star operator $\star$ associated to the Riemannian metric. The Poincaré lemma thus implies the existence of a function v on U with $dv=\star du.$ By definition of the Hodge star, $du$ and $dv$ are orthogonal to one another and hence linearly independent, and it then follows from the inverse function theorem that u and v form a coordinate system on some neighborhood of p. This coordinate system is automatically isothermal, since the orthogonality of $du$ and $dv$ implies the diagonality of the metric, and the norm-preserving property of the Hodge star implies the equality of the two diagonal components.

=== Gaussian curvature ===
In the isothermal coordinates $(u,v)$, the Gaussian curvature takes the simpler form

$$K = -\frac{1}{2} e^{-\rho} \left(\frac{\partial^2 \rho}{\partial u^2} + \frac{\partial^2 \rho}{\partial v^2}\right).$$

== See also ==
- Conformal map
- Liouville's equation
- Quasiconformal map
