= Beltrami equation =

Partial differential equation

In mathematics, the Beltrami equation, named after Eugenio Beltrami, is the partial differential equation

$$\frac{\partial w}{\partial \bar{z}} = \mu \frac{\partial w}{\partial z}.$$

for $w$ a complex distribution of the complex variable $z$ in some open set $U$, with derivatives that are locally L^{2}, and where $\mu$ is a given complex function in L^{∞}(U) of norm less than 1, called the Beltrami coefficient, and where $\partial / \partial z$ and $\partial / \partial \bar{z}$ are Wirtinger derivatives. Classically this differential equation was used by Gauss to prove the existence locally of isothermal coordinates on a surface with analytic Riemannian metric. Various techniques have been developed for solving the equation. The most powerful, developed in the 1950s, provides global solutions of the equation on C and relies on the L^{p} theory of the Beurling transform, a singular integral operator defined on L^{p}(C) for all 1 < p < ∞. The same method applies equally well on the unit disk and upper half plane and plays a fundamental role in Teichmüller theory and the theory of quasiconformal mappings. Various uniformization theorems can be proved using the equation, including the measurable Riemann mapping theorem and the simultaneous uniformization theorem. The existence of conformal weldings can also be derived using the Beltrami equation. One of the simplest applications is to the Riemann mapping theorem for simply connected bounded open domains in the complex plane. When the domain has smooth boundary, elliptic regularity for the equation can be used to show that the uniformizing map from the unit disk to the domain extends to a C^{∞} function from the closed disk to the closure of the domain.

== Metrics on planar domains ==
Consider a 2-dimensional Riemannian manifold, say with an (x, y) coordinate system on it. The curves of constant x on that surface typically don't intersect the curves of constant y orthogonally. A new coordinate system (u, v) is called isothermal when the curves of constant u do intersect the curves of constant v orthogonally and, in addition, the parameter spacing is the same — that is, for small enough h, the little region with $a\le u\le a+h$ and $b\le v\le b+h$ is nearly square, not just nearly rectangular. The Beltrami equation is the equation that has to be solved in order to construct isothermal coordinate systems.

To see how this works, let S be an open set in C and let

$$\displaystyle ds^2=E\,dx^2 + 2F\, dx\,dy + G\, dy^2$$

be a smooth metric g on S. The first fundamental form of g

$$\displaystyle g(x,y)=\begin{pmatrix} E & F \\ F & G\end{pmatrix}$$

is a positive real matrix (E > 0, G > 0, EG − F^{2} > 0) that varies smoothly with x and y.

The Beltrami coefficient of the metric g is defined to be

$$\displaystyle \mu(x,y)={E-G +2iF\over E+G +2\sqrt{EG-F^2}}$$

This coefficient has modulus strictly less than one since the identity

$$\displaystyle (E-G+2iF)(E-G-2iF)=(E+G+2\sqrt{EG-F^2})(E+G-2\sqrt{EG-F^2})$$

implies that

$$\displaystyle |\mu|^2={E+G - 2\sqrt{EG -F^2}\over E+G + 2\sqrt{EG-F^2}}<1.$$

Let f(x,y) =(u(x,y),v(x,y)) be a smooth diffeomorphism of S onto another open set T in C. The map f preserves orientation just when its Jacobian is positive:

$$\displaystyle u_x v_y-v_x u_y>0.$$

And using f to pull back to S the standard Euclidean metric ds^{2} = du^{2} + dv^{2} on T induces a metric on S given by

$$\displaystyle ds^2=du^2 + dv^2=(u_x^2+v_x^2)\, dx^2 + 2 (u_xu_y + v_xv_y)\, dx \, dy + (u_y^2 + v_y^2)\, dy^2,$$

a metric whose first fundamental form is

$$\displaystyle \begin{pmatrix} u_x^2+v_x^2 & u_x u_y+v_x v_y \\ u_x u_y+v_x v_y & u_y^2+v_y^2\end{pmatrix}.$$

When f both preserves orientation and induces a metric that differs from the original metric g only by a positive, smoothly varying scale factor r(x, y), the new coordinates u and v defined on S by f are called isothermal coordinates.

To determine when this happens, we reinterpret f as a complex-valued function of a complex variable f(x+iy) = u(x+iy) + iv(x+iy) so that we can apply the Wirtinger derivatives:

$$\displaystyle \partial_z= {1\over 2} (\partial_x-i\partial_y),\,\, \partial_{\overline{z}}={1\over 2} (\partial_x +i\partial_y);\,\,\,\,dz=dx+i\,dy,\,\,d\overline{z}=dx-i\,dy.$$

Since

$$\displaystyle f_z=((u_x+v_y)+i(v_x-u_y))/2$$
$$\displaystyle f_{\overline{z}}=((u_x-v_y)+i(v_x+u_y))/2,$$

the metric induced by f is given by

$$\displaystyle ds^2=|f_z \, dz + f_{\overline{z}}d\overline{z}|^2= |f_z|^2\, \left|dz + {f_{\overline{z}}\over f_z} \, d\overline{z}\right|^2.$$

The Beltrami quotient of this induced metric is defined to be $f_{\overline{z}}/f_z$.

The Beltrami quotient $f_{\overline{z}}/f_z$ of $f$ equals the Beltrami coefficient $\mu(z)$ of the original metric g just when

$\displaystyle ((u_x+v_y)+i(v_x-u_y))\bigl(E-G+2iF\bigr)$

$$=((u_x-v_y)+i(v_x+u_y))\bigl(E+G+2\sqrt{EG-F^2}\bigr).$$

The real and imaginary parts of this identity linearly relate $u_x,$ $u_y,$ $v_x,$ and $v_y,$ and solving for $u_y$ and $v_y$ gives

$$\displaystyle u_y=\frac{F u_x-\sqrt{EG-F^2}\,v_x}{E}\quad\text{and}
\quad v_y=\frac{\sqrt{EG-F^2}\,u_x+F v_x}{E}.$$

It follows that the metric induced by f is then r(x, y) g(x,y), where $r=(u_x^2+v_x^2)/E,$ which is positive, while the Jacobian of f is then $r\sqrt{EG-F^2},$ which is also positive. So, when $f_{\overline{z}}/f_z=\mu(z),$ the new coordinate system given by f is isothermal.

Conversely, consider a diffeomorphism f that does give us isothermal coordinates. We then have

$$\displaystyle \mu(z)=
\frac{(u_x^2+v_x^2)-(u_y+v_y)^2+2i(u_xu_y+v_xv_y)}
{(u_x^2+v_x^2)+(u_y^2+v_y)^2+2\sqrt{(u_x^2+v_x^2)(u_y^2+v_y^2)-(u_xu_y+v_xv_y)^2}},$$

where the scale factor r(x, y) has dropped out and the expression inside the square root is the perfect square $u_x^2v_y^2-2u_xv_xu_yv_y+v_x^2u_y^2.$ Since f must preserve orientation to give isothermal coordinates, the Jacobian $u_xv_y-v_xu_y$ is the positive square root; so we have

$$\displaystyle \mu(z)=
\frac{\bigl((u_x+iu_y)+i(v_x+iv_y)\bigr)\bigl((u_x+iu_y)-i(v_x+iv_y)\bigr)}
{\bigl((u_x+v_y)+i(v_x-u_y)\bigr)\bigl((u_x+v_y)-i(v_x-u_y)\bigr)}.$$

The right-hand factors in the numerator and denominator are equal and, since the Jacobian is positive, their common value can't be zero; so $\mu(z)=f_{\overline{z}}/f_z.$

Thus, the local coordinate system given by a diffeomorphism f is isothermal just when f solves the Beltrami equation for $\mu(z).$

== Isothermal coordinates for analytic metrics ==
Gauss proved the existence of isothermal coordinates locally in the analytic case by reducing the Beltrami to an ordinary differential equation in the complex domain. Here is a cookbook presentation of Gauss's technique.

An isothermal coordinate system, say in a neighborhood of the origin (x, y) = (0, 0), is given by the real and imaginary parts of a complex-valued function f(x, y) that satisfies

$$\displaystyle {f_{\overline{z}}\over f_z}=\mu(z)=\frac{E-G+2iF}{E+G+2\sqrt{EG-F^2}}.$$

Let $f$ be such a function, and let $\psi$ be a complex-valued function of a complex variable that is holomorphic and whose derivative is nowhere zero. Since any holomorphic function $\psi$ has $\psi_{\overline{z}}$ identically zero, we have

$$\begin{align}
\frac{(\psi\circ f)_{\overline{z}}}{(\psi\circ f)_z} & = \frac{(\psi_z\circ f)f_{\overline{z}}+(\psi_{\overline{z}}\circ f)\overline{f_{\overline{z}}}}{(\psi_z\circ f)f_z+(\psi_{\overline{z}}\circ f)\overline{f_z}}
=\frac{f_{\overline{z}}}{f_z}=\mu(z).
\end{align}$$

Thus, the coordinate system given by the real and imaginary parts of $\psi\circ f$ is also isothermal. Indeed, if we fix $f$ to give one isothermal coordinate system, then all of the possible isothermal coordinate systems are given by $\psi\circ f$ for the various holomorphic $\psi$ with nonzero derivative.

When E, F, and G are real analytic, Gauss constructed a particular isothermal coordinate system $h(x,y)=u(x,y)+iv(x,y),$ the one that he chose being the one with $h(x,0)=x$ for all x. So the u axis of his isothermal coordinate system coincides with the x axis of the original coordinates and is parameterized in the same way. All other isothermal coordinate systems are then of the form $\psi\circ h$ for a holomorphic $\psi$ with nonzero derivative.

Gauss lets q(t) be some complex-valued function of a real variable t that satisfies the following ordinary differential equation:

$$\displaystyle q'(t)=\frac{-F-i\sqrt{EG-F^2}}{E}(q(t),t),$$

where E, F, and G are here evaluated at y = t and x = q(t). If we specify the value of q(s) for some start value s, this differential equation determines the values of q(t) for t either less than or greater than s. Gauss then defines his isothermal coordinate system h by setting h(x, y) to be $q(0)$ along the solution path of that differential equation that passes through the point (x, y), and thus has q(y) = x.

This rule sets h(x, 0) to be $x$, since the starting condition is then q(0)=x. More generally, suppose that we move by an infinitesimal vector (dx, dy) away from some point (x, y), where dx and dy satisfy

$$\displaystyle E\,dx+(F+i\sqrt{EG-F^2}\,)\,dy=0.$$

Since $q'(t)=dx/dy$, the vector (dx, dy) is then tangent to the solution curve of the differential equation that passes through the point (x, y). Because we are assuming the metric to be analytic, it follows that

$$\displaystyle dh =c(x,y)\bigl(E\,dx+(F+i\sqrt{EG-F^2}\,)\,dy\bigr)$$

for some smooth, complex-valued function $c(x,y)=a(x,y)+ib(x,y).$ We thus have

$$\displaystyle h_z=((aE+bF+a\sqrt{EG-F^2}\,)+i(bE-aF+b\sqrt{EG-F^2}\,))/2$$
$$\displaystyle h_{\overline{z}}=((aE-bF-a\sqrt{EG-F^2}\,)+i(bE+aF-b\sqrt{EG-F^2}\,))/2.$$

We form the quotient $h_{\overline{z}}/h_z$ and then multiply numerator and denominator by $\overline{h_z}$, which is the complex conjugate of the denominator. Simplifying the result, we find that

$$\displaystyle
{h_{\overline{z}}\over h_z} = \frac{(a^2+b^2)E\;(E-G+2iF)}
{(a^2+b^2)E\;(E+G+2\sqrt{EG-F^2})}=\frac{E-G+2iF}{E+G+2\sqrt{EG-F^2}} =\mu(z).$$

Gauss's function h thus gives the desired isothermal coordinates.

== Solution in L^{2} for smooth Beltrami coefficients ==
In the simplest cases the Beltrami equation can be solved using only Hilbert space techniques and the Fourier transform. The method of proof is the prototype for the general solution using L^{p} spaces, although Adrien Douady has indicated a method for handling the general case using only Hilbert spaces: the method relies on the classical theory of quasiconformal mappings to establish Hölder estimates that are automatic in the L^{p} theory for p > 2. Let T be the Beurling transform on L^{2}(C) defined on the Fourier transform of an L^{2} function f as a multiplication operator:

$$\displaystyle \widehat{Tf}(z)= {\overline{z}\over z} \widehat{f}(z).$$

It is a unitary operator and if f is a tempered distribution on C with partial derivatives in L^{2} then

$$\displaystyle T(f_{\overline{z}})=f_z,$$

where the subscripts denote complex partial derivatives.

The fundamental solution of the operator

$$D=\partial_{\overline{z}}$$

is given by the distribution

$$\displaystyle{E(z) ={1\over \pi z},}$$

a locally integrable function on C. Thus on Schwartz functions f

$$\displaystyle{\partial_{\overline{z}}(E\star f) = f.}$$

The same holds for distributions of compact support on C. In particular if f is an L^{2} function with compact support, then its Cauchy transform, defined as

$$\displaystyle{Cf=E\star f,}$$

is locally square integrable. The above equation can be written

$$\displaystyle{(Cf)_{\overline{z}}=f.}$$

Moreover, still regarding f and Cf as distributions,

$$\displaystyle (Cf)_z= Tf.$$

Indeed, the operator D is given on Fourier transforms as multiplication by iz/2 and C as multiplication by its inverse.

Now in the Beltrami equation

$$\displaystyle f_{\overline{z}} = \mu f_z,$$

with μ a smooth function of compact support, set

$$\displaystyle g(z) = f(z) -z$$

and assume that the first derivatives of g are L^{2}. Let h = g_{z} = f_{z} – 1. Then

$$\displaystyle h=g_z=T(g_{\overline{z}})= T(f_{\overline{z}})=T(\mu f_z)=T(\mu h) + T\mu$$

If A and B are the operators defined by

$$\displaystyle{AF=T\mu F,\,\,\,\, BF =\mu TF}$$

then their operator norms are strictly less than 1 and

$$\displaystyle{(I-A)h = T\mu.}$$

Hence

$$\displaystyle{h=(I-A)^{-1}T\mu,\,\,\, T^*h=(I-B)^{-1}\mu}$$

where the right hand sides can be expanded as Neumann series. It follows that

$$\displaystyle{g_{\overline{z}}=T^*h,}$$

has the same support as μ and g. Hence f is given by

$$\displaystyle{f(z) = CT^*h(z) + z.}$$

Elliptic regularity can now be used to deduce that f is smooth.

In fact, off the support of μ,

$$\displaystyle \partial_{\overline{z}} f =0,$$

so by Weyl's lemma f is even holomorphic for |z| > R. Since f = CT*h + z, it follows that f tends to 0 uniformly as |z| tends to ∞.

The elliptic regularity argument to prove smoothness, however, is the same everywhere and uses the theory of L^{2} Sobolev spaces on the torus. Let ψ be a smooth function of compact support on C, identically equal to 1 on a neighbourhood of the support of μ and set F = ψ f. The support of F lies in a large square |x|, |y| ≤ R, so, identifying opposite sides of the square, F and μ can be regarded as a distribution and smooth function on a torus T^{2}. By construction F is in L^{2}(T^{2}). As a distribution on T^{2} it satisfies

$$\displaystyle F_{\overline{z}}= \mu F_{z} + GF,$$

where G is smooth. On the canonical basis e_{m} of L^{2}(T^{2}) with m in Z + i Z, define

$$\displaystyle{Ue_m={\overline{m}\over m}e_m \,\, (m\ne 0), Ue_0=e_0.}$$

Thus U is a unitary and on trigonometric polynomials or smooth functions P

$$\displaystyle{U(P_{\overline{z}})=P_z.}$$

Similarly it extends to a unitary on each Sobolev space H_{k}(T^{2}) with the same property. It is the counterpart on the torus of the Beurling transform. The standard theory of Fredholm operators shows that the operators corresponding to I – μ U and I – U μ are invertible on each Sobolev space. On the other hand,

$$\displaystyle{\partial_{z}(I-U\mu)F= UG.}$$

Since UG is smooth, so too is (I – μU)F and hence also F.

Thus the original function f is smooth. Regarded as a map of C = R^{2} into itself, the Jacobian is given by

$$\displaystyle{J(f)=|f_z|^2-|f_{\overline{z}}|^2=|f_z|^2(1-|\mu|^2).}$$

This Jacobian is nowhere vanishing by a classical argument of Ahlfors (1966). In fact formally writing f_{z} = e^{k}, it follows that

$$\displaystyle{k_{\overline{z}} = \mu k_{z} + \mu_{z}.}$$

This equation for k can be solved by the same methods as above giving a solution tending to 0 at ∞. By uniqueness h + 1 = e^{k} so that

$$\displaystyle{J(f)=(1-|\mu|^2)|e^{2 k}|}$$

is nowhere vanishing. Since f induces a smooth map of the Riemann sphere C ∪ ∞ into itself which is locally a diffeomorphism, f must be a diffeomorphism. In fact f must be onto by connectedness of the sphere, since its image is an open and closed subset; but then, as a covering map, f must cover each point of the sphere the same number of times. Since only ∞ is sent to ∞, it follows that f is one-to-one.

The solution f is a quasiconformal conformal diffeomorphism. These form a group and their Beltrami coefficients can be computed according to the following rule:

$$\displaystyle{\mu_{g\circ f^{-1}}\circ f={f_z\over \overline{f_z}} {\mu_g-\mu_f\over 1 -\overline{\mu_f}\mu_g}.}$$

Moreover, if f(0) = 0 and

$$\displaystyle{g(z)=f(z^{-1})^{-1},}$$

then

$$\displaystyle{\mu_g(z)={z^2\over \overline{z}^2} \mu_f(z^{-1}).}$$

This formula reflects the fact that on a Riemann surface, a Beltrami coefficient is not a function. Under a holomorphic change of coordinate w = w(z), the coefficient is transformed to

$$\displaystyle{\widetilde{\mu}(w)= (w^\prime/ \overline{w^\prime})\cdot\mu(z).}$$

Defining a smooth Beltrami coefficient on the sphere in this way, if μ is such a coefficient then, taking a smooth bump function ψ equal to 0 near 0, equal 1 for |z| > 1 and satisfying 0 ≤ ψ ≤ 1, μ can be written as a sum of two Beltrami coefficients:

$$\displaystyle{\mu=\psi\mu + (1-\psi) \mu=\mu_0 + \mu_\infty.}$$

Let g be the quasiconformal diffeomorphism of the sphere fixing 0 and ∞ with coefficient μ_{∞}. Let λ be the Beltrami coefficient of compact support on C defined by

$$\displaystyle \lambda(z)= \left[{\mu_0 \over 1 -\mu\overline{\mu_\infty}}     {g_z\over\overline{g_z}}\right] \circ g^{-1}(z).$$

If f is the quasiconformal diffeomorphism of the sphere fixing 0 and ∞ with coefficient λ, then the transformation formulas above show that f $\circ$ g^{−1} is a quasiconformal diffeomorphism of the sphere fixing 0 and ∞ with coefficient μ.

The solutions of Beltrami's equation restrict to diffeomorphisms of the upper halfplane or unit disk if the coefficient μ has extra symmetry properties; since the two regions are related by a Möbius transformation (the Cayley transform), the two cases are essentially the same.

For the upper halfplane Im z > 0, if μ satisfies

$$\displaystyle \mu(z)=\overline{\mu(\overline{z})},$$

then by uniqueness the solution f of the Beltrami equation satisfies

$$\displaystyle f(z)=\overline{f(\overline{z})},$$

so leaves the real axis and hence the upper halfplane invariant.

Similarly for the unit disc |z| < 1, if μ satisfies

$$\displaystyle \mu(z)={z^2\over \overline{z}^2}\overline{\mu(\overline{z}^{-1})},$$

then by uniqueness the solution f of the Beltrami equation satisfies

$$\displaystyle{f(z)=\overline{f(\overline{z}^{-1})}^{-1},}$$

so leaves the unit circle and hence the unit disk invariant.

Conversely Beltrami coefficients defined on the closures of the upper halfplane or unit disk which satisfy these conditions on the boundary can be "reflected" using the formulas above. If the extended functions are smooth the preceding theory can be applied. Otherwise the extensions will be continuous but with a jump in the derivatives at the boundary. In that case the more general theory for measurable coefficients μ is required and is most directly handled within the L^{p} theory.

== Smooth Riemann mapping theorem ==
Let U be an open simply connected domain in the complex plane with smooth boundary containing 0 in its interior and let F be a diffeomorphism of the unit disk D onto U extending smoothly to the boundary and the identity on a neighbourhood of 0. Suppose that in addition the induced metric on the closure of the unit disk can be reflected in the unit circle to define a smooth metric on C. The corresponding Beltrami coefficient is then a smooth function on C vanishing near 0 and ∞ and satisfying

$$\displaystyle \mu(z)={z^2\over \overline{z}^2}\overline{\mu(\overline{z}^{-1})}^{-1}.$$

The quasiconformal diffeomorphism h of C satisfying

$$\displaystyle{h_{\overline{z}}=\mu(z) h_z}$$

preserves the unit circle together with its interior and exterior. From the composition formulas for Beltrami coefficients

$$\displaystyle{\mu_{F\circ h^{-1}}=0,}$$

so that f = F$\circ$ h^{−1} is a smooth diffeomorphism between the closures of D and U which is holomorphic on the interior. Thus, if a suitable diffeomorphism F can be constructed, the mapping f proves the smooth Riemann mapping theorem for the domain U.

To produce a diffeomorphism F with the properties above, it can be assumed after an affine transformation that the boundary of U has length 2π and that 0 lies in U. The smooth version of the Schoenflies theorem produces a smooth diffeomorphism G from the closure of D onto the closure of u equal to the identity on a neighbourhood of 0 and with an explicit form on a tubular neighbourhood of the unit circle. In fact taking polar coordinates (r,θ) in R^{2} and letting (x(θ),y(θ)) (θ in [0,2π]) be a parametrization of ∂U by arclength, G has the form

$$\displaystyle G(r,\theta)=(x(\theta)-(1-r)y^\prime(\theta),y(\theta) +(1-r)x^\prime(\theta)).$$

Taking t = 1 − r as parameter, the induced metric near the unit circle is given by

$$\displaystyle ds^2=(1+t\kappa(\theta))^2 d\theta^2 + dt^2,$$

where

$$\displaystyle \kappa(\theta)=y^{\prime\prime}(\theta)x^\prime(\theta) - x^{\prime\prime}(\theta) y^\prime(\theta)$$

is the curvature of the plane curve (x(θ),y(θ)).

Let

$$\displaystyle \alpha={1\over 2\pi}\int_0^{2\pi} \kappa(\theta)\, d\theta,\,\,\, h(\theta)=\kappa(\theta) -\alpha.$$

After a change of variable in the t coordinate and a conformal change in the metric, the metric takes the form

$$\displaystyle ds^2 =(1 + t\psi(t)h(\theta))^2 d\theta^2 + dt^2,$$

where ψ is an analytic real-valued function of t:

$$\displaystyle \psi(t)=1 +a_1t +a_2 t^2 + \cdots$$

A formal diffeomorphism sending (θ,t) to (f(θ,t),t) can be defined as a formal power series in t:

$$\displaystyle f(\theta,t)=\theta + f_1(\theta)t + f_2(\theta)t^2 + \cdots=\theta + g(\theta,t)$$

where the coefficients f_{n} are smooth functions on the circle. These coefficients can be defined by recurrence so that the transformed metric only has even powers of t in the coefficients. This condition is imposed by demanding that no odd powers of t appear in the formal power series expansion:

$$\left[1+t\psi(t)\left(\sum_{n\ge 0} h^{(n)} g^n/n!\right)\right] \cdot \left[(1+g^\prime) \, d\theta + \left(\sum_{n\ge 1} n f_n t^{n-1}\right) \, dt\right].$$

By Borel's lemma, there is a diffeomorphism defined in a neighbourhood of the unit circle, t = 0, for which the formal expression f(θ,t) is the Taylor series expansion in the t variable. It follows that, after composing with this diffeomorphism, the extension of the metric obtained by reflecting in the line t = 0 is smooth.

== Hölder continuity of solutions ==
Douady and others have indicated ways to extend the L^{2} theory to prove the existence and uniqueness of solutions when the Beltrami coefficient μ is bounded and measurable with L^{∞} norm k strictly less than one. Their approach involved the theory of quasiconformal mappings to establish directly the solutions of Beltrami's equation when μ is smooth with fixed compact support are uniformly Hölder continuous. In the L^{p} approach Hölder continuity follows automatically from operator theory.

The L^{p} theory when μ is smooth of compact support proceeds as in the L^{2} case. By the Calderón–Zygmund theory the Beurling transform and its inverse are known to be continuous for the L^{p} norm. The Riesz–Thorin convexity theorem implies that the norms C^{p} are continuous functions of p. In particular C_{p} tends to 1 when p tends to 2.

In the Beltrami equation

$$\displaystyle{f_{\overline{z}} = \mu f_z,}$$

with μ a smooth function of compact support, set

$$\displaystyle g(z) = f(z) -z$$

and assume that the first derivatives of g are L^{p}. Let h = g_{z} = f_{z} – 1. Then

$$\displaystyle{h=g_z=T(g_{\overline{z}})= T(f_{\overline{z}})=T(\mu f_z)=T(\mu h) + T\mu.}$$

If A and B are the operators defined by AF = TμF and BF = μTF, then their operator norms are strictly less than 1 and (I − A)h = Tμ. Hence

$$\displaystyle h=(I-A)^{-1}T\mu,\,\,\, T^{-1}=(I-B)^{-1}\mu$$

where the right hand sides can be expanded as Neumann series. It follows that

$$\displaystyle g_{\overline{z}}=T^{-1}h,$$

has the same support as μ and g. Hence, up to the addition of a constant, f is given by

$$\displaystyle f(z) = CT^{-1}h(z) + z.$$

Convergence of functions with fixed compact support in the L^{p} norm for p > 2 implies convergence in L^{2}, so these formulas are compatible with the L^{2} theory if p > 2.

The Cauchy transform C is not continuous on L^{2} except as a map into functions of vanishing mean oscillation. On L^{p} its image is contained in Hölder continuous functions with Hölder exponent 1 − 2p^{−1} once a suitable constant is added. In fact for a function f of compact support define

$$\begin{align}
Pf(w) & =Cf(w) +\pi ^{-1} \iint_{\mathbf{C}} {f(z)\over z} \, dx \, dy \\[4pt]
& = -{1\over \pi} \iint_{\mathbf{C}} f(z)\left({1\over z-w} -{1\over z}\right)\, dx \, dy= -{1\over \pi}\iint_{\mathbf{C}} {f(z)w\over z(z-w)}\, dx \, dy.
\end{align}$$

Note that the constant is added so that Pf(0) = 0. Since Pf only differs from Cf by a constant, it follows exactly as in the L^{2} theory that

$$\displaystyle (Pf)_{\overline{z}} = f,\,\,\, (Pf)_z = Tf.$$

Moreover, P can be used instead of C to produce a solution:

$$\displaystyle f(z)=PT^{-1}h(z) +z.$$

On the other hand, the integrand defining Pf is in L^{q} if q^{−1} = 1 − p^{−1}. The Hölder inequality implies that Pf is Hölder continuous with an explicit estimate:

$$\displaystyle |Pf(w_1) - Pf(w_2)| \le K_p \|f\|_p|w_1-w_2|^{1-2/p},$$

where

$$\displaystyle K_p= \|z^{-1}(z-1)^{-1}\|_q/\pi.$$

For any p > 2 sufficiently close to 2, C_{p}k <1. Hence the Neumann series for (I − A)^{−1} and (I − B)^{−1} converge. The Hölder estimates for P yield the following uniform estimates for the normalized solution of the Beltrami equation:

$$\displaystyle |f(w_1)-f(w_2)|\le {K_p\over 1 -\|\mu\|_\infty C_p} \|\mu\|_p|w_1-w_2|^{1-2/p} + |w_1 -w_2|.$$

If μ is supported in |z| ≤ R, then

$$\displaystyle \|\mu\|_p\le (\pi R^2)^{1/p} \|\mu\|_\infty.$$

Setting w_{1} = z and w_{2} = 0, it follows that for |z| ≤ R

$$\displaystyle |f(z)| \le   \left[ 1+ {K_p\pi^{1/p} \|\mu\|_\infty\over 1 -\|\mu\|_\infty C_p}\right]\cdot R = CR,$$

where the constant C > 0 depends only on the L^{∞} norm of μ. So the Beltrami coefficient of f^{−1} is smooth and supported in z| ≤ CR. It has the same L^{∞} norm as that of f. So the inverse diffeomorphisms also satisfy uniform Hölder estimates.

== Solution for measurable Beltrami coefficients ==
=== Existence ===
The theory of the Beltrami equation can be extended to measurable Beltrami coefficients μ. For simplicity only a special class of μ will be considered—adequate for most applications—namely those functions which are smooth an open set Ω (the regular set) with complement Λ a closed set of measure zero (the singular set). Thus Λ is a closed set that is contained in open sets of arbitrarily small area. For measurable Beltrami coefficients μ with compact support in |z| < R, the solution of the Beltrami equation can be obtained as a limit of solutions for smooth Beltrami coefficients.

In fact in this case the singular set Λ is compact. Take smooth functions φ_{n} of compact support with 0 ≤ φ_{n} ≤ 1, equal to 1 on a neighborhood of Λ and 0 off a slightly larger neighbourhood, shrinking to Λ as n increases. Set

$$\displaystyle{\mu_n=(1-\varphi_n)\cdot\mu.}$$

The μ_{n} are smooth with compact support in |z| < R and

$$\displaystyle{\|\mu_n\|_\infty \le \|\mu\|_\infty.}$$

The μ_{n} tend to μ in any L^{p} norm with p < ∞.

The corresponding normalised solutions f_{n} of the Beltrami equations and their inverses g_{n} satisfy uniform Hölder estimates. They are therefore equicontinuous on any compact subset of C; they are even holomorphic for |z| > R. So by the Arzelà–Ascoli theorem, passing to a subsequence if necessary, it can be assumed that both f_{n} and g_{n} converge uniformly on compacta to f and g. The limits will satisfy the same Hölder estimates and be holomorphic for |z| > R. The relations f_{n}$\circ$g_{n} = id = g_{n}$\circ$f_{n} imply that in the limit f$\circ$g = id = g$\circ$f, so that f and g are homeomorphisms.

- The limits f and g are weakly differentiable. In fact let

$$\displaystyle{u_n=\partial_{\overline{z}} f_n,\,\, v_n =\partial_z f_n-1.}$$

These lie in L^{p} and are uniformly bounded:

$$\displaystyle{\|u_n\|_p,\,\, \|v_n\|_p \le {\|\mu_n\|_p\over 1 - \|\mu_n\|_\infty}.}$$

Passing to a subsequence if necessary, it can be assumed that the sequences have weak limits u and v in L^{p}. These are the distributional derivatives of f(z) – z, since if ψ is smooth of compact support

$$\displaystyle{\iint u \cdot \psi =\lim\iint u_n\cdot \psi =-\lim \iint f_n \cdot \partial_{\overline {z}} \psi = -\iint f\cdot   \partial_{\overline {z}} \psi,}$$

and similarly for v. A similar argument applies for the g using the fact that Beltrami coefficients of the g_{n} are supported in a fixed closed disk.

- f satisfies the Beltrami equation with Beltrami coefficient μ. In fact the relation u = μ ⋅ v + μ follows by continuity from the relation u_{n} = μ_{n} ⋅ v_{n} + μ_{n}. It suffices to show that μ_{n} ⋅ v_{n} tends weakly to μ ⋅ v. The difference can be written

$$\displaystyle{\mu v -\mu_n v_n= \mu(v-v_n) +(\mu-\mu_n)v_n.}$$

The first term tends weakly to 0, while the second term equals μ φ_{n} v_{n}. The terms are uniformly bounded in L^{p}, so to check weak convergence to 0 it enough to check inner products with a dense subset of L^{2}. The inner products with functions of compact support in Ω are zero for n sufficiently large.

- f carries closed sets of measure zero onto closed sets of measure zero. It suffices to check this for a compact set K of measure zero. If U is a bounded open set containing K and J denotes the Jacobian of a function, then

$$\begin{align}
A(f_n(U)) & = \iint_U J(f_n)\, dx\, dy =\iint_U |\partial_z f_n|^2 -|\partial_{\overline{z}}f_n|^2\, dx\,dy \\[4pt]
& \le \iint_U  |\partial_z f_n|^2\, dx\, dy\le \|\partial_z f_n|_U\|_p^2 \,A(U)^{1-2/p}.
\end{align}$$

Thus if A(U) is small, so is A(f_{n}(U)). On the other hand f_{n}(U) eventually contains f(K), for applying the inverse g_{n}, U eventually contains g_{n} $\circ$f (K) since g_{n} $\circ$f tends uniformly to the identity on compacta. Hence f(K) has measure zero.

- f is smooth on the regular set Ω of μ. This follows from the elliptic regularity results in the L^{2} theory.
- f has non-vanishing Jacobian there. In particular f_{z} ≠ 0 on Ω. In fact for z_{0} in Ω, if n is large enough

$$\displaystyle{\partial_{\overline{z}}  (f\circ g_n) = 0}$$

near z_{1} = f_{n}(z_{0}). So h = f $\circ$ g_{n} is holomorphic near z_{1}. Since it is locally a homeomorphism, h ' (z_{1}) ≠ 0. Since f =h $\circ$ f_{n}. it follows that the Jacobian of f is non-zero at z_{0}. On the other hand J(f) = |f_{z}|^{2} (1 − |μ|^{2}), so f_{z} ≠ 0 at z_{0}.

- g satisfies the Beltrami equation with Beltrami coefficient

$$\displaystyle{\mu^\prime(f(z))=-{f_z\over \overline{f_z}}\cdot \mu(z)}$$

or equivalently

$$\displaystyle{\mu^\prime(w) =-{\overline{g_w}\over g_w} \cdot \mu(g(w))}$$

on the regular set Ω ' = f(Ω), with corresponding singular set Λ ' = f(Λ).

- g satisfies the Beltrami equation for μ′. In fact g has weak distributional derivatives in 1 + L^{p} and L^{p}. Pairing with smooth functions of compact support in Ω, these derivatives coincide with the actual derivatives at points of Ω. Since Λ has measure zero, the distributional derivatives equal the actual derivatives in L^{p}. Thus g satisfies Beltrami's equation since the actual derivatives do.
- If f* and f are solutions constructed as above for μ* and μ then f* $\circ$ f^{−1} satisfies the Beltrami equation for

$$\displaystyle \nu(f(z))={f_z\over \overline{f_z}} \, {\mu^* - \mu\over 1-\overline{\mu} \mu^*},$$

defined on Ω ∩ Ω*. The weak derivatives of f* $\circ$ f^{−1} are given by the actual derivatives on Ω ∩ Ω*. In fact this follows by approximating f* and g = f^{−1} by f*_{n} and g_{n}. The derivatives are uniformly bounded in 1 + L^{p} and L^{p}, so as before weak limits give the distributional derivatives of f* $\circ$ f^{−1}. Pairing with smooth functions of compact support in Ω ∩ Ω*, these agree with the usual derivatives. So the distributional derivatives are given by the usual derivatives off Λ ∪ Λ*, a set of measure zero.

This establishes the existence of homeomorphic solutions of Beltrami's equation in the case of Beltrami coefficients of compact support. It also shows that the inverse homeomorphisms and composed homeomorphisms satisfy Beltrami equations and that all computations can be performed by restricting to regular sets.

If the support is not compact the same trick used in the smooth case can be used to construct a solution in terms of two homeomorphisms associated to compactly supported Beltrami coefficients. Note that, because of the assumptions on the Beltrami coefficient, a Möbius transformation of the extended complex plane can be applied to make the singular set of the Beltrami coefficient compact. In that case one of the homeomorphisms can be chosen to be a diffeomorphism.

=== Uniqueness ===
There are several proofs of the uniqueness of solutions of the Beltrami equation with a given Beltrami coefficient. Since applying a Möbius transformation of the complex plane to any solution gives another solution, solutions can be normalised so that they fix 0, 1 and ∞. The method of solution of the Beltrami equation using the Beurling transform also provides a proof of uniqueness for coefficients of compact support μ and for which the distributional derivatives are in 1 + L^{p} and L^{p}. The relations

$$\displaystyle (P\psi)_{\overline{z}} = \psi, \,\, \, (P\psi)_{z} = T\psi$$

for smooth functions ψ of compact support are also valid in the distributional sense for L^{p} functions h since they can be written as L^{p} of ψ_{n}'s. If f is a solution of the Beltrami equation with f(0) = 0 and f_{z} - 1 in L^{p} then

$$\displaystyle{F=f-P(f_{\overline{z}})}$$

satisfies

$$\displaystyle{\partial_{\overline{z}}F =0.}$$

So F is weakly holomorphic. Applying Weyl's lemma it is possible to conclude that there exists a holomorphic function G that is equal to F almost everywhere. Abusing notation redefine F:=G. The conditions F '(z) − 1 lies in L^{p} and F(0) = 0 force F(z) = z. Hence

$$\displaystyle{P(f_{\overline{z}}) = f(z) + z}$$

and so differentiating

$$\displaystyle{f_z=T(\mu f_z) + 1.}$$

If g is another solution then

$$\displaystyle{f_z-g_z=T(\mu(f_z-g_z)).}$$

Since Tμ has operator norm on L^{p} less than 1, this forces

$$\displaystyle{f_z=g_z.}$$

But then from the Beltrami equation

$$\displaystyle{f_{\overline{z}}=g_{\overline{z}}.}$$

Hence f − g is both holomorphic and antiholomorphic, so a constant. Since f(0) = 0 = g(0), it follows that f = g. Note that since f is holomorphic off the support of μ and f(∞) = ∞, the conditions that the derivatives are locally in L^{p} force

$$\displaystyle{f_z -1,\,\,f_{\overline{z}}\in L^p(\mathbf{C}).}$$

For a general f satisfying Beltrami's equation and with distributional derivatives locally in L^{p}, it can be assumed after applying a Möbius transformation that 0 is not in the singular set of the Beltrami coefficient μ. If g is a smooth diffeomorphism g with Beltrami coefficient λ supported near 0, the Beltrami coefficient ν for f $\circ$ g^{−1} can be calculated directly using the change of variables formula for distributional derivatives:

$$\displaystyle \nu(g(z))= {g_z\over \overline{g_z}} \,{\mu -\lambda\over 1-\overline{\lambda}\mu}.$$

λ can be chosen so that ν vanishes near zero. Applying the map z^{−1} results in a solution of Beltrami's equation with a Beltrami coefficient of compact support. The directional derivatives are still locally in L^{p}. The coefficient ν depends only on μ, λ and g, so any two solutions of the original equation will produce solutions near 0 with distributional derivatives locally in L^{p} and the same Beltrami coefficient. They are therefore equal. Hence the solutions of the original equation are equal.

== Uniformization of multiply connected planar domains ==
The method used to prove the smooth Riemann mapping theorem can be generalized to multiply connected planar regions with smooth boundary. The Beltrami coefficient in these cases is smooth on an open set, the complement of which has measure zero. The theory of the Beltrami equation with measurable coefficients is therefore required.

Doubly connected domains. If Ω is a doubly connected planar region, then there is a diffeomorphism F of an annulus r ≤ |z| ≤ 1 onto the closure of Ω, such that after a conformal change the induced metric on the annulus can be continued smoothly by reflection in both boundaries. The annulus is a fundamental domain for the group generated by the two reflections, which reverse orientation. The images of the fundamental domain under the group fill out C with 0 removed and the Beltrami coefficient is smooth there. The canonical solution h of the Beltrami equation on C, by the L^{p} theory is a homeomorphism. It is smooth on away from 0 by elliptic regularity. By uniqueness it preserves the unit circle, together with its interior and exterior. Uniqueness of the solution also implies that reflection there is a conjugate Möbius transformation g such that h $\circ$ R = g $\circ$ h where R denotes reflection in |z| = r. Composing with a Möbius transformation that fixes the unit circle it can be assumed that g is a reflection in a circle |z| = s with s < 1. It follows that F $\circ$ h_{−1} is a smooth diffeomorphism of the annulus s ≤ |z| ≤ 1 onto the closure of Ω, holomorphic in the interior.

Multiply connected domains. For regions with a higher degree of connectivity k + 1, the result is essentially Bers's generalization of the retrosection theorem. There is a smooth diffeomorphism F of the region Ω_{1}, given by the unit disk with k open disks removed, onto the closure of Ω. It can be assumed that 0 lies in the interior of the domain. Again after a modification of the diffeomorphism and conformal change near the boundary, the metric can be assumed to be compatible with reflection. Let G be the group generated by reflections in the boundary circles of Ω_{1}. The interior of Ω_{1} iz a fundamental domain for G. Moreover, the index two normal subgroup G_{0} consisting of orientation-preserving mappings is a classical Schottky group. Its fundamental domain consists of the original fundamental domain with its reflection in the unit circle added. If the reflection is R_{0}, it is a free group with generators R_{i}$\circ$R_{0} where R_{i} are the reflections in the interior circles in the original domain. The images of the original domain by the G, or equivalently the reflected domain by the Schottky group, fill out the regular set for the Schottky group. It acts properly discontinuously there. The complement is the limit set of G_{0}. It has measure zero. The induced metric on Ω_{1} extends by reflection to the regular set. The corresponding Beltrami coefficient is invariant for the reflection group generated by the reflections R_{i} for i ≥ 0. Since the limit set has measure zero, the Beltrami coefficient extends uniquely to a bounded measurable function on C. smooth on the regular set. The normalised solution of the Beltrami equation h is a smooth diffeomorphism of the closure of Ω_{1} onto itself preserving the unit circle, its exterior and interior. Necessarily h $\circ$ R_{i} = S_{i} $\circ$ h. where S_{i} is the reflection in another circle in the unit disk. Looking at fixed points, the circles arising this way for different i must be disjoint. It follows that F $\circ$ h^{−1} defines a smooth diffeomorphism of the unit disc with the interior of these circles removed onto the closure of Ω, which is holomorphic in the interior.

== Simultaneous uniformization ==
Bers (1961) showed that two compact Riemannian 2-manifolds M_{1}, M_{2} of genus g > 1 can be simultaneously uniformized.

As topological spaces M_{1} and M_{2} are homeomorphic to a fixed quotient of the upper half plane H by a discrete cocompact subgroup Γ of PSL(2,R). Γ can be identified with the fundamental group of the manifolds and H is a universal covering space. The homeomorphisms can be chosen to be piecewise linear on corresponding triangulations. A result of Munkres (1960) implies that the homeomorphisms can be adjusted near the edges and the vertices of the triangulation to produce diffeomorphisms. The metric on M_{1} induces a metric on H which is Γ-invariant. Let μ be the corresponding Beltrami coefficient on H. It can be extended to C by reflection

$$\displaystyle \widehat{\mu}(z) = \mu(z)\,\, (z\in \mathbf{H}),\,\, \widehat{\mu}(z)=0 \,\, (z\in\mathbf{R}),\,\, \widehat{\mu}(z)
=\overline{\mu(\overline{z})}\,\, (\overline{z} \in \mathbf{H}).$$

It satisfies the invariance property

$$\displaystyle \widehat{\mu}(g(z))=  {\overline{g_z}\over g_z}\, \widehat{\mu}(z),$$

for g in Γ. The solution f of the corresponding Beltrami equation defines a homeomorphism of C, preserving the real axis and the upper and lower half planes. Conjugation of the group elements by f^{−1} gives a new cocompact subgroup Γ_{1} of PSL(2,R). Composing the original diffeomorphism with the inverse of f then yield zero as the Beltrami coefficient. Thus the metric induced on H is invariant under Γ_{1} and conformal to the Poincaré metric on H. It must therefore be given by multiplying by a positive smooth function that is Γ_{1}-invariant. Any such function corresponds to a smooth function on M_{1}. Dividing the metric on M_{1} by this function results in a conformally equivalent metric on M_{1} which agrees with the Poincaré metric on H / Γ_{1}. In this way M_{1} becomes a compact Riemann surface, i.e. is uniformized and inherits a natural complex structure.

With this conformal change in metric M_{1} can be identified with H / Γ_{1}. The diffeomorphism between onto M_{2} induces another metric on H which is invariant under Γ_{1}. It defines a Beltrami coefficient λ omn H which this time is extended to C by defining λ to be 0 off H. The solution h of the Beltrami equation is a homeomorphism of C which is holomorphic on the lower half plane and smooth on the upper half plane. The image of the real axis is a Jordan curve dividing C into two components. Conjugation of Γ_{1} by h^{−1} gives a quasi-Fuchsian subgroup Γ_{2} of PSL(2,C). It leaves invariant the Jordan curve and acts properly discontinuously on each of the two components. The quotients of the two components by Γ_{2} are naturally identified with M_{1} and M_{2}. This identification is compatible with the natural complex structures on both M_{1} and M_{2}.

== Conformal welding ==
An orientation-preserving homeomorphism f of the circle is said to be quasisymmetric if there are positive constants a and b such that

$$\displaystyle{{{|f(z_1)-f(z_2)|\over |f(z_1)-f(z_3)|} \le a\cdot {|z_1-z_2|^b\over|z_1-z_3|^b}}.}$$

If

$$\displaystyle{|z_1-z_2|=|z_1-z_3|,}$$

then the condition becomes

$$\displaystyle{a^{-1}\le {|f(z_1)-f(z_2)|\over |f(z_1)-f(z_3)|} \le a.}$$

Conversely if this condition is satisfied for all such triples of points, then f is quasisymmetric.

An apparently weaker condition on a homeomorphism f of the circle is that it be quasi-Möbius, that is there are constants c, d > 0 such that

$$\displaystyle{|(f(z_1),f(z_2);f(z_3),f(z_4))| \le c |(z_1,z_2;z_3,z_4)|^d,}$$

where

$$\displaystyle{ (z_1,z_2;z_3,z_4)={(z_1-z_3)(z_2-z_4)\over(z_2-z_3)(z_1-z_4)}}$$

denotes the cross-ratio. In fact if f is quasisymmetric then it is also quasi-Möbius, with c = a^{2} and d = b: this follows by multiplying the first inequality above for (z_{1},z_{3},z_{4}) and (z_{2},z_{4},z_{3}).

Conversely if f is a quasi-Möbius homeomorphism then it is also quasisymmetric. Indeed, it is immediate that if f is quasi-Möbius so is its inverse. It then follows that f (and hence f^{−1}) is Hölder continuous. To see this let S be the set of cube roots of unity, so that if a ≠ b in S, then |a − b| = 2 sin π/3 = √3. To prove a Hölder estimate, it can be assumed that x – y is uniformly small. Then both x and y are greater than a fixed distance away from a, b in S with a ≠ b, so the estimate follows by applying the quasi-Möbius inequality to x, a, y, b. To check that f is quasisymmetric, it suffices to find a uniform upper bound for |f(x) − f(y)| / |f(x) − f(z)| in the case of a triple with |x − z| = |x − y|, uniformly small. In this case there is a point w at a distance greater than 1 from x, y and z. Applying the quasi-Möbius inequality to x, w, y and z yields the required upper bound.

A homeomorphism f of the unit circle can be extended to a homeomorphism F of the closed unit disk which is diffeomorphism on its interior. Douady & Earle (1986), generalizing earlier results of Ahlfors and Beurling, produced such an extension with the additional properties that it commutes with the action of SU(1,1) by Möbius transformations and is quasiconformal if f is quasisymmetric. (A less elementary method was also found independently by Tukia (1985): Tukia's approach has the advantage of also applying in higher dimensions.) When f is a diffeomorphism of the circle, the Alexander extension provides another way of extending f:

$$\displaystyle{F(r,\theta)=r \exp [i\psi(r)g(\theta) + i(1-\psi(r))\theta] ,}$$

where ψ is a smooth function with values in [0,1], equal to 0 near 0 and 1 near 1, and

$$\displaystyle{f(e^{i\theta})=e^{ig(\theta)},}$$

with g(θ + 2π) = g(θ) + 2π. Partyka, Sakan & Zając (1999) give a survey of various methods of extension, including variants of the Ahlfors-Beurling extension which are smooth or analytic in the open unit disk.

In the case of a diffeomorphism, the Alexander extension F can be continued to any larger disk |z| < R with R > 1. Accordingly, in the unit disc

$$\displaystyle{\|\mu\|_\infty < 1, \,\,\, \mu(z)=F_{\overline{z}}/F_z.}$$

This is also true for the other extensions when f is only quasisymmetric.

Now extend μ to a Beltrami coefficient on the whole of C by setting it equal to 0 for |z| ≥ 1. Let G be the corresponding solution of the Beltrami equation. Let F_{1}(z) = G $\circ$ F^{−1}(z) for |z| ≤ 1 and F_{2}(z) = G (z) for |z| ≥ 1. Thus F_{1} and F_{2} are univalent holomorphic maps of |z| < 1 and |z| > 1 onto the inside and outside of a Jordan curve. They extend continuously to homeomorphisms f_{i} of the unit circle onto the Jordan curve on the boundary. By construction they satisfy the conformal welding condition:

$$\displaystyle{f=f_1^{-1}\circ f_2.}$$

== See also ==
- Quasiconformal mapping
- Measurable Riemann mapping theorem
- Isothermal coordinates
