= Measurable Riemann mapping theorem =

In mathematics, the measurable Riemann mapping theorem is a theorem proved in 1960 by Lars Ahlfors and Lipman Bers in complex analysis and geometric function theory. Contrary to its name, it is not a direct generalization of the Riemann mapping theorem, but instead a result concerning quasiconformal mappings and solutions of the Beltrami equation. The result was prefigured by earlier results of Charles Morrey from 1938 on quasi-linear elliptic partial differential equations.

== Theorem ==
The theorem of Ahlfors and Bers states that if μ is a bounded measurable function on C with $\|\mu\|_\infty < 1$, then there is a unique solution f of the Beltrami equation

$$\partial_{\overline{z}} f(z) = \mu(z) \partial_z f(z)$$

for which f is a quasiconformal homeomorphism of C fixing the points 0, 1 and ∞. A similar result is true with C replaced by the unit disk D. Their proof used the Beurling transform, a singular integral operator.
