= Quasiconformal mapping =

Homeomorphism between plane domains

In mathematical complex analysis, a quasiconformal mapping is a (weakly differentiable) homeomorphism between plane domains which to first order takes small circles to small ellipses of bounded eccentricity. Quasiconformal mappings are a generalization of conformal mappings that permit the bounded distortion of angles locally. Quasiconformal mappings were introduced by Grötzsch (1928) and named by Ahlfors (1935),

Intuitively, let f : D → D′ be an orientation-preserving homeomorphism between open sets in the plane. If f is continuously differentiable, it is K-quasiconformal if, at every point, its derivative maps circles to ellipses with the ratio of the major to minor axis bounded by K.

== Definition ==
Suppose f : D → D′ where D and D′ are two domains in C. There are a variety of equivalent definitions, depending on the required smoothness of f. If f is assumed to have continuous partial derivatives, then f is quasiconformal provided it satisfies the Beltrami equation

$\frac{\partial f}{\partial\bar{z}} = \mu(z)\frac{\partial f}{\partial z},$	1

for some complex valued Lebesgue measurable μ satisfying $\sup |\mu| < 1$ (Bers 1977). This equation admits a geometrical interpretation. Equip D with the metric tensor

$$ds^2 = \Omega(z)^2\left| dz + \mu(z) \, d\bar{z}\right|^2,$$

where Ω(z) > 0. Then f satisfies (1) precisely when it is a conformal transformation from D equipped with this metric to the domain D′ equipped with the standard Euclidean metric. The function f is then called μ-conformal. More generally, the continuous differentiability of f can be replaced by the weaker condition that f be in the Sobolev space W^{1,2}(D) of functions whose first-order distributional derivatives are in L^{2}(D). In this case, f is required to be a weak solution of (1). When μ is zero almost everywhere, any homeomorphism in W^{1,2}(D) that is a weak solution of (1) is conformal.

Without appeal to an auxiliary metric, consider the effect of the pullback under f of the usual Euclidean metric. The resulting metric is then given by

$$\left|\frac{\partial f}{\partial z}\right|^2\left|dz+\mu(z)\,d\bar{z}\right|^2$$

which, relative to the background Euclidean metric $dz \, d\bar{z}$, has eigenvalues

$$(1+|\mu|)^2\left|\frac{\partial f}{\partial z}\right|^2,\qquad (1-|\mu|)^2 \left|\frac{\partial f}{\partial z}\right|^2.$$

The eigenvalues represent, respectively, the squared length of the major and minor axes of the ellipse obtained by pulling back along f the unit circle in the tangent plane.

Accordingly, the dilatation of f at a point z is defined by

$$K(z) = \frac{1+|\mu(z)|}{1-|\mu(z)|}.$$

The (essential) supremum of K(z) is given by

$$K = \sup_{z\in D} |K(z)| = \frac{1+\|\mu\|_\infty}{1-\|\mu\|_\infty}$$

and is called the dilatation of f. If f is K-quasiconformal for some finite K, then f is quasiconformal.

A definition based on the notion of extremal length is as follows. If there is a finite K such that for every collection Γ of curves in D the extremal length of Γ is at most K times the extremal length of {f o γ : γ ∈ Γ}. Then f is K-quasiconformal.

== Properties ==
If K > 1 then the maps x + iy ↦ Kx + iy and x + iy ↦ x + iKy are both quasiconformal and have constant dilatation K.

If s > −1 then the map $z\mapsto z\,|z|^{s}$ is quasiconformal (here z is a complex number) and has constant dilatation $\max(1+s, \frac{1}{1+s})$. When s ≠ 0, this is an example of a quasiconformal homeomorphism that is not smooth. If s = 0, this is simply the identity map.

A homeomorphism is 1-quasiconformal if and only if it is conformal. If f : D → D′ is K-quasiconformal and g : D′ → D′′ is K′-quasiconformal, then g o f is KK′-quasiconformal. The inverse of a K-quasiconformal homeomorphism is K-quasiconformal. Since K-quasiconformal maps are preserved under composition with conformal maps, one can extend the notion of K-quasiconformal maps to general Riemann surfaces.

The space of K-quasiconformal mappings from the complex plane to itself mapping three distinct points to three given points is compact.

== Measurable Riemann mapping theorem ==
Of central importance in the theory of quasiconformal mappings in two dimensions is the measurable Riemann mapping theorem, proved by Lars Ahlfors and Lipman Bers. The theorem generalizes the Riemann mapping theorem from conformal to quasiconformal homeomorphisms, and is stated as follows. Suppose that D is a simply connected domain in C that is not equal to C, and suppose that μ : D → C is Lebesgue measurable and satisfies $\|\mu\|_\infty<1$. Then there is a quasiconformal homeomorphism f from D to the unit disk which is in the Sobolev space W^{1,2}(D) and satisfies the corresponding Beltrami equation (1) in the distributional sense. As with Riemann's mapping theorem, this f is unique up to 3 real parameters.

== Computational quasi-conformal geometry ==
Recently, quasi-conformal geometry has attracted attention from different fields, such as applied mathematics, computer vision and medical imaging. Computational quasi-conformal geometry has been developed, which extends the quasi-conformal theory into a discrete setting. It has found various important applications in medical image analysis, computer vision and graphics.

== See also ==
- Conformal map
- Isothermal coordinates
- Quasiregular map
- Pseudoanalytic function
- Teichmüller space
- Tissot's indicatrix
