= Riemann mapping theorem =

Mathematical theorem

In complex analysis, the Riemann mapping theorem states that if $U$ is a non-empty simply connected open subset of the complex number plane $\mathbb{C}$ which is not all of $\mathbb{C}$, then there exists a biholomorphic mapping $f$ (i.e. a bijective holomorphic mapping whose inverse is also holomorphic) from $U$ onto the open unit disk

$$D = \{z\in \mathbb{C} : |z| < 1\}.$$

This mapping is sometimes called the Riemann mapping from $U$ to the unit disk.

Intuitively, the condition that $U$ be simply connected means that $U$ does not contain any "holes". The fact that $f$ is biholomorphic implies that it is a conformal map and therefore angle-preserving. Such a map may be interpreted as preserving the shape of any sufficiently small figure, while possibly rotating and scaling (but not reflecting) it.

Henri Poincaré proved that the map $f$ is unique up to rotation and recentering: if $z_0$ is an element of $U$ and $\phi$ is an arbitrary angle, then there exists precisely one f as above such that $f(z_0)=0$ and such that the argument of the derivative of $f$ at the point $z_0$ is equal to $\phi$. This is an easy consequence of the Schwarz lemma.

As a corollary of the theorem, any two simply connected open subsets of the Riemann sphere which both lack at least two points of the sphere can be conformally mapped into each other.

== History ==
The theorem was stated (under the assumption that the boundary of $U$ is piecewise smooth) by Bernhard Riemann in 1851 in his PhD thesis. Lars Ahlfors wrote once, concerning the original formulation of the theorem, that it was "ultimately formulated in terms which would defy any attempt of proof, even with modern methods". Riemann's flawed proof depended on the Dirichlet principle (which was named by Riemann himself), which was considered sound at the time. However, Karl Weierstrass found that this principle was not universally valid. Later, David Hilbert was able to prove that, to a large extent, the Dirichlet principle is valid under the hypothesis that Riemann was working with. However, in order to be valid, the Dirichlet principle needs certain hypotheses concerning the boundary of $U$ (namely, that it is a Jordan curve) which are not valid for simply connected domains in general.

The first rigorous proof of the theorem was given by William Fogg Osgood in 1900. He proved the existence of Green's function on arbitrary simply connected domains other than $\mathbb{C}$ itself; this established the Riemann mapping theorem.

Constantin Carathéodory gave another proof of the theorem in 1912, which was the first to rely purely on the methods of function theory rather than potential theory. His proof used Montel's concept of normal families, which became the standard method of proof in textbooks. Carathéodory continued in 1913 by resolving the additional question of whether the Riemann mapping between the domains can be extended to a homeomorphism of the boundaries (see Carathéodory's theorem).

Carathéodory's proof used Riemann surfaces and it was simplified by Paul Koebe two years later in a way that did not require them. Another proof, due to Lipót Fejér and to Frigyes Riesz, was published in 1922 and it was rather shorter than the previous ones. In this proof, like in Riemann's proof, the desired mapping was obtained as the solution of an extremal problem. The Fejér–Riesz proof was further simplified by Alexander Ostrowski and by Carathéodory.

== Importance ==
The following points detail the uniqueness and power of the Riemann mapping theorem:

- Even relatively simple Riemann mappings (for example a map from the interior of a circle to the interior of a square) have no explicit formula using only elementary functions.
- Simply connected open sets in the plane can be highly complicated, for instance, the boundary can be a nowhere-differentiable fractal curve of infinite length, even if the set itself is bounded. One such example is the Koch curve. The fact that such a set can be mapped in an angle-preserving manner to the nice and regular unit disc seems counter-intuitive.
- The analog of the Riemann mapping theorem for more complicated domains is not true. The next simplest case is of doubly connected domains (domains with a single hole). Any doubly connected domain except for the punctured disk and the punctured plane is conformally equivalent to some annulus $\{z:r<|z|<1\}$ with $0<r<1$, however there are no conformal maps between annuli except inversion and multiplication by constants so the annulus $\{z:1<|z|<2\}$ is not conformally equivalent to the annulus $\{z:1<|z|<4\}$ (as can be proven using extremal length).
- The analogue of the Riemann mapping theorem in three or more real dimensions is not true. The family of conformal maps in three dimensions is very poor, and essentially contains only Möbius transformations (see Liouville's theorem).
- Even if arbitrary homeomorphisms in higher dimensions are permitted, contractible manifolds can be found that are not homeomorphic to the ball (e.g., the Whitehead continuum).
- The analogue of the Riemann mapping theorem in several complex variables is also not true. In $\mathbb{C}^n$ ($n \ge 2$), the ball and polydisk are both simply connected, but there is no biholomorphic map between them.

== Proof via normal families ==
=== Simple connectivity ===
Theorem. For an open domain $G\subset\mathbb{C}$ the following conditions are equivalent:

1. $G$ is simply connected;
2. the integral of every holomorphic function $f$ around a closed piecewise smooth curve in $G$ vanishes;
3. every holomorphic function in $G$ is the derivative of a holomorphic function;
4. every nowhere-vanishing holomorphic function $f$ on $G$ has a holomorphic logarithm;
5. every nowhere-vanishing holomorphic function $g$ on $G$ has a holomorphic square root;
6. for any $w\notin G$, the winding number of $w$ for any piecewise smooth closed curve in $G$ is $0$;
7. the complement of $G$ in the extended complex plane $\mathbb{C}\cup\{\infty\}$ is connected.

(1) ⇒ (2) because any continuous closed curve, with base point $a\in G$, can be continuously deformed to the constant curve $a$. So the line integral of $f\,\mathrm{d}z$ over the curve is $0$.

(2) ⇒ (3) because the integral over any piecewise smooth path $\gamma$ from $a$ to $z$ can be used to define a primitive.

(3) ⇒ (4) by integrating $f^{-1}\,\mathrm{d}f/\mathrm{d}z$ along $\gamma$ from $a$ to $x$ to give a branch of the logarithm.

(4) ⇒ (5) by taking the square root as $g(z)=\exp(f(x)/2)$ where $f$ is a holomorphic choice of logarithm.

(5) ⇒ (6) because if $\gamma$ is a piecewise closed curve and $f_n$ are successive square roots of $z-w$ for $w$ outside $G$, then the winding number of $\gamma$ about $w$ is $2^n$ times the winding number of $f_n\circ\gamma$ about $0$. Hence the winding number of $\gamma$ about $w$ must be divisible by $2^n$ for all $n$, so it must equal $0$.

(6) ⇒ (7) for otherwise the extended plane $\mathbb{C}\cup\{\infty\}\setminus G$ can be written as the disjoint union of two open and closed sets $A$ and $B$ with $\infty\in B$ and $A$ bounded. Let $\delta>0$ be the shortest Euclidean distance between $A$ and $B$ and build a square grid on $\mathbb{C}$ with length $\delta/4$ with a point $a$ of $A$ at the centre of a square. Let $C$ be the compact set of the union of all squares with distance $\leq\delta/4$ from $A$. Then $C\cap B=\varnothing$ and $\partial C$ does not meet $A$ or $B$: it consists of finitely many horizontal and vertical segments in $G$ forming a finite number of closed rectangular paths $\gamma_j\in G$. Taking $C_i$ to be all the squares covering $A$, then $\frac{1}{2\pi}\int_{\partial C}\mathrm{d}\mathrm{arg}(z-a)$ equals the sum of the winding numbers of $C_i$ over $a$, thus giving $1$. On the other hand the sum of the winding numbers of $\gamma_j$ about $a$ equals $1$. Hence the winding number of at least one of the $\gamma_j$ about $a$ is non-zero.

(7) ⇒ (1) This is a purely topological argument. Let $\gamma$ be a piecewise smooth closed curve based at $z_0\in G$. By approximation γ is in the same homotopy class as a rectangular path on the square grid of length $\delta>0$ based at $z_0$; such a rectangular path is determined by a succession of $N$ consecutive directed vertical and horizontal sides. By induction on $N$, such a path can be deformed to a constant path at a corner of the grid. If the path intersects at a point $z_1$, then it breaks up into two rectangular paths of length $<N$, and thus can be deformed to the constant path at $z_1$ by the induction hypothesis and elementary properties of the fundamental group. The reasoning follows a "northeast argument": in the non self-intersecting path there will be a corner $z_0$ with largest real part (easterly) and then amongst those one with largest imaginary part (northerly). Reversing direction if need be, the path go from $z_0-\delta$ to $z_0$ and then to $w_0=z_0-in\delta$ for $n\geq1$ and then goes leftwards to $w_0-\delta$. Let $R$ be the open rectangle with these vertices. The winding number of the path is $0$ for points to the right of the vertical segment from $z_0$ to $w_0$ and $-1$ for points to the right; and hence inside $R$. Since the winding number is $0$ off $G$, $R$ lies in $G$. If $z$ is a point of the path, it must lie in $G$; if $z$ is on $\partial R$ but not on the path, by continuity the winding number of the path about $z$ is $-1$, so $z$ must also lie in $G$. Hence $R\cup\partial R\subset G$. But in this case the path can be deformed by replacing the three sides of the rectangle by the fourth, resulting in two less sides (with self-intersections permitted).

=== Riemann mapping theorem ===
- Weierstrass' convergence theorem. The uniform limit on compacta of a sequence of holomorphic functions is holomorphic; similarly for derivatives.

This is an immediate consequence of Morera's theorem for the first statement. Cauchy's integral formula gives a formula for the derivatives which can be used to check that the derivatives also converge uniformly on compacta.

- Hurwitz's theorem. If a sequence of nowhere-vanishing holomorphic functions on an open domain has a uniform limit on compacta, then either the limit is identically zero or the limit is nowhere-vanishing. If a sequence of univalent holomorphic functions on an open domain has a uniform limit on compacta, then either the limit is constant or the limit is univalent.

If the limit function is non-zero, then its zeros have to be isolated. Zeros with multiplicities can be counted by the winding number $\frac{1}{2\pi i}\int_C\left(g(z)\right)^{-1}g'(z)\mathrm{d}z$ for a holomorphic function $g$. Hence winding numbers are continuous under uniform limits, so that if each function in the sequence has no zeros nor can the limit. For the second statement suppose that $f(a)=f(b)$ and set $g_n(z)=f_n(z)-f_n(a)$. These are nowhere-vanishing on a disk but $g(z)=f(z)-f(a)$ vanishes at $b$, so $g$ must vanish identically.

Definitions. A family ${\cal F}$ of holomorphic functions on an open domain is said to be normal if any sequence of functions in ${\cal F}$ has a subsequence that converges to a holomorphic function uniformly on compacta. A family ${\cal F}$ is compact if whenever a sequence $f_n$ lies in ${\cal F}$ and converges uniformly to $f$ on compacta, then $f$ also lies in ${\cal F}$. A family ${\cal F}$ is said to be locally bounded if their functions are uniformly bounded on each compact disk. Differentiating the Cauchy integral formula, it follows that the derivatives of a locally bounded family are also locally bounded.

- Montel's theorem. Every locally bounded family of holomorphic functions in a domain $G$ is normal.

Let $f_n$ be a totally bounded sequence and chose a countable dense subset $w_m$ of $G$. By locally boundedness and a "diagonal argument", a subsequence can be chosen so that $g_n$ is convergent at each point $w_m$. It must be verified that this sequence of holomorphic functions converges on $G$ uniformly on each compactum $K$. Take $E$ open with $K\subset E$ such that the closure of $E$ is compact and contains $G$. Since the sequence $\{g_n'\}$ is locally bounded, $|g_n'|\leq M$ on $E$. By compactness, if $\delta>0$ is taken small enough, finitely many open disks $D_k$ of radius $\delta>0$ are required to cover $K$ while remaining in $E$. Since

$$g_n(b) - g_n(a)= \int_a^b g_n^\prime(z)\, dz$$,

we have that $|g_n(a)-g_n(b)|\leq M|a-b|\leq2\delta M$. Now for each $k$ choose some $w_i$ in $D_k$ where $g_n(w_i)$ converges, take $n$ and $m$ so large to be within $\delta$ of its limit. Then for $z\in D_k$,

$$|g_n(z) - g_m(z)| \leq |g_n(z) - g_n(w_i)| + |g_n(w_i) - g_m(w_i)| + |g_m(w_1) - g_m(z)|\leq  4M\delta + 2\delta.$$

Hence the sequence $\{g_n\}$ forms a Cauchy sequence in the uniform norm on $K$ as required.

- Riemann mapping theorem. If $G\neq\mathbb{C}$ is a simply connected domain and $a\in G$, there is a unique conformal mapping $f$ of $G$ onto the unit disk $D$ normalized such that $f(a)=0$ and $f'(a)>0$.

Uniqueness follows because if $f$ and $g$ satisfied the same conditions, $h=f\circ g^{-1}$ would be a univalent holomorphic map of the unit disk with $h(0)=0$ and $h'(0)>0$. But by the Schwarz lemma, the univalent holomorphic maps of the unit disk onto itself are given by the Möbius transformations

$$k(z)=e^{i\theta}(z-\alpha)/(1-\overline{\alpha} z)$$

with $|\alpha|<1$. So $h$ must be the identity map and $f=g$.
To prove existence, take ${\cal F}$ to be the family of holomorphic univalent mappings $f$ of $G$ into the open unit disk $D$ with $f(a)=0$ and $f'(a)>0$. It is a normal family by Montel's theorem. By the characterization of simple-connectivity, for $b\in\mathbb{C}\setminus G$ there is a holomorphic branch of the square root $h(z)=\sqrt{z -b}$ in $G$. It is univalent and $h(z_1)\neq-h(z_2)$ for $z_1,z_2\in G$. By the open mapping theorem, $h(G)$ contains a closed disk $\Delta$; say with centre $h(a)$ and radius $r>0$. Thus no points of $-\Delta$ can lie in $h(G)$. Let $F$ be the unique Möbius transformation taking $\mathbb{C}\setminus-\Delta$ onto $D$ with the normalization $F(h(a))=0$ and $(F \circ h)'(a)=F'(h(a))\cdot h'(a)>0$. By construction $F\circ h$ is in ${\cal F}$, so that ${\cal F}$ is non-empty. The method of Koebe is to use an extremal function to produce a conformal mapping solving the problem: in this situation it is often called the Ahlfors function of G, after Ahlfors. Let $0<M\leq\infty$ be the supremum of $f'(a)$ for $f\in{\cal F}$. Pick $f_n\in{\cal F}$ with $f_n'(a)$ tending to $M$. By Montel's theorem, passing to a subsequence if necessary, $f_n$ tends to a holomorphic function $f$ uniformly on compacta. By Hurwitz's theorem, $f$ is either univalent or constant. But $f$ has $f(a)=0$ and $f'(a)>0$. So $M$ is finite, equal to $f'(a)>0$ and ${f\in\cal F}$. It remains to check that the conformal mapping $f$ takes $G$ onto $D$. If not, take $c\neq0$ in $D\setminus f(G)$ and let $H$ be a holomorphic square root of $(f(z)-c)/(1-\overline{c}f(z))$ on $G$. The function $H$ is univalent and maps $G$ into $D$. Let

$$F(z)=\frac{e^{i\theta}(H(z)-H(a))}{1-\overline{H(a)}H(z)},$$

where $H'(a)/|H'(a)|=e^{-i\theta}$. Then $F\in{\cal F}$ and a routine computation shows that

$$F'(a)=e^{i\theta} H'(a)/(1-|H(a)|^2)=f'(a)\left(\sqrt{|c|}+\sqrt{|c|^{-1}}\right)/2>f'(a)=M.$$

This contradicts the maximality of $M$, so that $f$ must take all values in $D$.

Remark. As a consequence of the Riemann mapping theorem, every simply connected domain in the plane is homeomorphic to the unit disk. If points are omitted, this follows from the theorem. For the whole plane, the homeomorphism $\phi(z)=z/(1+|z|)$ gives a homeomorphism of $\mathbb{C}$ onto $D$.

=== Parallel slit mappings ===
Koebe's uniformization theorem for normal families also generalizes to yield uniformizers $f$ for multiply-connected domains to finite parallel slit domains, where the slits have angle $\theta$ to the x-axis. Thus if $G$ is a domain in $\mathbb{C}\cup\{\infty\}$ containing $\infty$ and bounded by finitely many Jordan contours, there is a unique univalent function $f$ on $G$ with

$$f(z)=z^{-1}+a_1z+a_2z^2+\cdots$$

near $\infty$, maximizing $\mathrm{Re}(e^{-2i\theta}a_1)$ and having image $f(G)$ a parallel slit domain with angle $\theta$ to the x-axis.

The first proof that parallel slit domains were canonical domains for in the multiply connected case was given by David Hilbert in 1909. Jenkins (1958), on his book on univalent functions and conformal mappings, gave a treatment based on the work of Herbert Grötzsch and René de Possel from the early 1930s; it was the precursor of quasiconformal mappings and quadratic differentials, later developed as the technique of extremal metric due to Oswald Teichmüller. Menahem Schiffer gave a treatment based on very general variational principles, summarised in addresses he gave to the International Congress of Mathematicians in 1950 and 1958. In a theorem on "boundary variation" (to distinguish it from "interior variation"), he derived a differential equation and inequality, that relied on a measure-theoretic characterisation of straight-line segments due to Ughtred Shuttleworth Haslam-Jones from 1936. Haslam-Jones' proof was regarded as difficult and was only given a satisfactory proof in the mid-1970s by Schober and Campbell–Lamoureux.

Schiff (1993) gave a proof of uniformization for parallel slit domains which was similar to the Riemann mapping theorem. To simplify notation, horizontal slits will be taken. Firstly, by Bieberbach's inequality, any univalent function

$$g(z)=z+cz^2+\cdots$$

with $z$ in the open unit disk must satisfy $|c|\leq2$. As a consequence, if

$$f(z)=z+a_0+a_1z^{-1}+\cdots$$

is univalent in $|z|>R$, then $|f(z)-a_0|\leq2|z|$. To see this, take $S>R$ and set

$$g(z)=S(f(S/z)-b)^{-1}$$

for $z$ in the unit disk, choosing $b$ so the denominator is nowhere-vanishing, and apply the Schwarz lemma. Next the function $f_R(z)=z+R^2/z$ is characterized by an "extremal condition" as the unique univalent function in $z>R$ of the form $z+a_1z^{-1}+\cdots$ that maximises $\mathrm{Re}(a_1)$: this is an immediate consequence of Grönwall's area theorem, applied to the family of univalent functions $f(zR)/R$ in $z>1$.

To prove now that the multiply connected domain $G\subset\mathbb{C}\cup\{\infty\}$ can be uniformized by a horizontal parallel slit conformal mapping

$$f(z)=z+a_1z^{-1}+\cdots$$,

take $R$ large enough that $\partial G$ lies in the open disk $|z|<R$. For $S>R$, univalency and the estimate $|f(z)|\leq2|z|$ imply that, if $z$ lies in $G$ with $|z|\leq S$, then $|f(z)|\leq2S$. Since the family of univalent $f$ are locally bounded in $G\setminus\{\infty\}$, by Montel's theorem they form a normal family. Furthermore if $f_n$ is in the family and tends to $f$ uniformly on compacta, then $f$ is also in the family and each coefficient of the Laurent expansion at $\infty$ of the $f_n$ tends to the corresponding coefficient of $f$. This applies in particular to the coefficient: so by compactness there is a univalent $f$ which maximizes $\mathrm{Re}(a_1)$. To check that

$$f(z)=z+a_1+\cdots$$

is the required parallel slit transformation, suppose reductio ad absurdum that $f(G)=G_1$ has a compact and connected component $K$ of its boundary which is not a horizontal slit. Then the complement $G_2$ of $K$ in $\mathbb{C}\cup\{\infty\}$ is simply connected with $G_2\supset G_1$. By the Riemann mapping theorem there is a conformal mapping

$$h(w)=w+b_1w^{-1}+\cdots,$$

such that $h(G_2)$ is $\mathbb{C}$ with a horizontal slit removed. So we have that

$$h(f(z))=z+(a_1+b_1)z^{-1}+\cdots,$$

and thus $\mathrm{Re}(a_1+b_1)\leq\mathrm{Re}(a_1)$ by the extremality of $f$. Therefore, $\mathrm{Re}(b_1)\leq0$. On the other hand by the Riemann mapping theorem there is a conformal mapping

$$k(w)=w+c_0+c_1w^{-1}+\cdots,$$

mapping from $|w|>S$ onto $G_2$. Then

$$f(k(w))-c_0=w+(a_1+c_1)w^{-1}+\cdots.$$

By the strict maximality for the slit mapping in the previous paragraph, we can see that $\mathrm{Re}(c_1)<\mathrm{Re}(b_1+c_1)$, so that $\mathrm{Re}(b_1)>0$. The two inequalities for $\mathrm{Re}(b_1)$ are contradictory.

The proof of the uniqueness of the conformal parallel slit transformation is given in Goluzin (1969) and Grunsky (1978). Applying the inverse of the Joukowsky transform $h$ to the horizontal slit domain, it can be assumed that $G$ is a domain bounded by the unit circle $C_0$ and contains analytic arcs $C_i$ and isolated points (the images of other the inverse of the Joukowsky transform under the other parallel horizontal slits). Thus, taking a fixed $a\in G$, there is a univalent mapping

$$F_0(w)=h\circ f(w)=(w-a)^{-1}+a_1(w-a)+a_2(w-a)^2+\cdots,$$

with its image a horizontal slit domain. Suppose that $F_1(w)$ is another uniformizer with

$$F_1(w)=(w-a)^{-1}+b_1(w-a)+b_2(w-a)^2+\cdots.$$

The images under $F_0$ or $F_1$ of each $C_i$ have a fixed y-coordinate so are horizontal segments. On the other hand, $F_2(w)=F_0(w)-F_1(w)$ is holomorphic in $G$. If it is constant, then it must be identically zero since $F_2(a)=0$. Suppose $F_2$ is non-constant, then by assumption $F_2(C_i)$ are all horizontal lines. If $t$ is not in one of these lines, Cauchy's argument principle shows that the number of solutions of $F_2(w)=t$ in $G$ is zero (any $t$ will eventually be encircled by contours in $G$ close to the $C_i$'s). This contradicts the fact that the non-constant holomorphic function $F_2$ is an open mapping.

== Sketch proof via Dirichlet problem ==
Given $U$ and a point $z_0\in U$, we want to construct a function $f$ which maps $U$ to the unit disk and $z_0$ to $0$. For this sketch, we will assume that U is bounded and its boundary is smooth, much like Riemann did. Write

$$f(z) = (z - z_0)e^{g(z)},$$

where $g=u+iv$ is some (to be determined) holomorphic function with real part $u$ and imaginary part $v$. It is then clear that $z_0$ is the only zero of $f$. We require $|f(z)|=1$ for $z\in\partial U$, so we need

$$u(z) = -\log|z - z_0|$$

on the boundary. Since $u$ is the real part of a holomorphic function, we know that $u$ is necessarily a harmonic function; i.e., it satisfies Laplace's equation.

The question then becomes: does a real-valued harmonic function $u$ exist that is defined on all of $U$ and has the given boundary condition? The positive answer is provided by the Dirichlet principle. Once the existence of $u$ has been established, the Cauchy–Riemann equations for the holomorphic function $g$ allow us to find $v$ (this argument depends on the assumption that $U$ be simply connected). Once $u$ and $v$ have been constructed, one has to check that the resulting function $f$ does indeed have all the required properties.

== Uniformization theorem ==
The Riemann mapping theorem can be generalized to the context of Riemann surfaces: If $U$ is a non-empty simply-connected open subset of a Riemann surface, then $U$ is biholomorphic to one of the following: the Riemann sphere, the complex plane $\mathbb{C}$, or the unit disk $D$. This is known as the uniformization theorem.

== Smooth Riemann mapping theorem ==
In the case of a simply connected bounded domain with smooth boundary, the Riemann mapping function and all its derivatives extend by continuity to the closure of the domain. This can be proved using regularity properties of solutions of the Dirichlet boundary value problem, which follow either from the theory of Sobolev spaces for planar domains or from classical potential theory. Other methods for proving the smooth Riemann mapping theorem include the theory of kernel functions or the Beltrami equation.

== Algorithms ==
Computational conformal mapping is prominently featured in problems of applied analysis and mathematical physics, as well as in engineering disciplines, such as image processing.

In the early 1980s an elementary algorithm for computing conformal maps was discovered. Given points $z_0, \ldots, z_n$ in the plane, the algorithm computes an explicit conformal map of the unit disk onto a region bounded by a Jordan curve $\gamma$ with $z_0, \ldots, z_n \in \gamma.$ This algorithm converges for Jordan regions in the sense of uniformly close boundaries. There are corresponding uniform estimates on the closed region and the closed disc for the mapping functions and their inverses. Improved estimates are obtained if the data points lie on a $C^1$ curve or a K-quasicircle. The algorithm was discovered as an approximate method for conformal welding; however, it can also be viewed as a discretization of the Loewner differential equation.

The following is known about numerically approximating the conformal mapping between two planar domains.

Positive results:

- There is an algorithm A that computes the uniformizing map in the following sense. Let $\Omega$ be a bounded simply-connected domain, and $w_0\in\Omega$. $\partial\Omega$ is provided to A by an oracle representing it in a pixelated sense (i.e., if the screen is divided to $2^n \times 2^n$ pixels, the oracle can say whether each pixel belongs to the boundary or not). Then A computes the absolute values of the uniformizing map $\phi:(\Omega, w_0) \to (D, 0)$ with precision $2^{-n}$ in space bounded by $Cn^2$ and time $2^{O(n)}$, where $C$ depends only on the diameter of $\Omega$ and $d(w_0, \partial\Omega).$ Furthermore, the algorithm computes the value of $\phi(w)$ with precision $2^{-n}$ as long as $|\phi(w)| < 1-2^{-n}.$ Moreover, A queries $\partial\Omega$ with precision of at most $2^{-O(n)}.$ In particular, if $\partial\Omega$ is polynomial space computable in space $n^a$ for some constant $a\geq 1$ and time $T(n) < 2^{O(n^a)},$ then A can be used to compute the uniformizing map in space $C\cdot n^{\max(a,2)}$ and time $2^{O(n^a)}.$
- There is an algorithm A′ that computes the uniformizing map in the following sense. Let $\Omega$ be a bounded simply-connected domain, and $w_0 \in \Omega.$ Suppose that for some $n=2^k,$ $\partial\Omega$ is given to A′ with precision $\tfrac{1}{n}$ by $O(n^2)$ pixels. Then A′ computes the absolute values of the uniformizing map $\phi:(\Omega, w_0) \to (D, 0)$ within an error of $O(1/n)$ in randomized space bounded by $O(k)$ and time polynomial in $n=2^k$ (that is, by a BPL(n)-machine). Furthermore, the algorithm computes the value of $\phi(w)$ with precision $\tfrac{1}{n}$ as long as $|\phi(w)|< 1 -\tfrac{1}{n}.$

Negative results:

- Suppose there is an algorithm A that given a simply-connected domain $\Omega$ with a linear-time computable boundary and an inner radius $>1/2$ and a number $n$ computes the first $20 n$ digits of the conformal radius $r(\Omega, 0),$ then we can use one call to A to solve any instance of a #SAT(n) with a linear time overhead. In other words, #P is poly-time reducible to computing the conformal radius of a set.
- Consider the problem of computing the conformal radius of a simply-connected domain $\Omega,$ where the boundary of $\Omega$ is given with precision $1/n$ by an explicit collection of $O(n^2)$ pixels. Denote the problem of computing the conformal radius with precision $1/n^c$ by $\texttt{CONF}(n,n^c).$ Then, $\texttt{MAJ}_n$ is AC0 reducible to $\texttt{CONF}(n,n^c)$ for any $0 < c < \tfrac{1}{2}.$

== See also ==
- Measurable Riemann mapping theorem
- Schwarz–Christoffel mapping – a conformal transformation of the upper half-plane onto the interior of a simple polygon.
- Conformal radius
