= Lebesgue point =

In mathematics, given a locally Lebesgue integrable function $f$ on $\mathbb{R}^k$, a point $x$ in the domain of $f$ is a Lebesgue point if

$$\lim_{r\rightarrow 0^+}\frac{1}{\lambda (B(x,r))}\int_{B(x,r)} \!|f(y)-f(x)|\,\mathrm{d}y=0.$$

Here, $B(x,r)$ is a ball centered at $x$ with radius $r > 0$, and $\lambda (B(x,r))$ is its Lebesgue measure. The Lebesgue points of $f$ are thus points where $f$ does not oscillate too much, in an average sense.

The Lebesgue differentiation theorem states that, given any $f\in L^1(\mathbb{R}^k)$, almost every $x$ is a Lebesgue point of $f$.
