= Singular integral operators of convolution type =

Mathematical concept

In mathematics, singular integral operators of convolution type are the singular integral operators that arise on R^{n} and T^{n} through convolution by distributions; equivalently, they are the singular integral operators that commute with translations. The classical examples in harmonic analysis are the harmonic conjugation operator on the circle, the Hilbert transform on the circle and the real line, the Beurling transform in the complex plane and the Riesz transforms in Euclidean space. The continuity of these operators on L^{2} is evident because the Fourier transform converts them into multiplication operators. Continuity on L^{p} spaces was first established by Marcel Riesz. The classical techniques include the use of Poisson integrals, interpolation theory and the Hardy–Littlewood maximal function. For more general operators, fundamental new techniques, introduced by Alberto Calderón and Antoni Zygmund in 1952, were developed by a number of authors to give general criteria for continuity on L^{p} spaces. This article explains the theory for the classical operators and sketches the subsequent general theory.

== L^{2} theory ==
=== Hilbert transform on the circle ===
The theory for L^{2} functions is particularly simple on the circle. If f ∈ L^{2}(T), then it has a Fourier series expansion
$$f(\theta)=\sum_{n \in \mathbf{Z}} a_n e^{in\theta}.$$

Hardy space H^{2}(T) consists of the functions for which the negative coefficients vanish, a_{n} = 0 for n < 0. These are precisely the square-integrable functions that arise as boundary values of holomorphic functions in the open unit disk. Indeed, f is the boundary value of the function

$$F(z)=\sum_{n\ge 0} a_n z^n,$$

in the sense that the functions

$$f_r(\theta)=F(re^{i\theta}),$$

defined by the restriction of F to the concentric circles |z| = r, satisfy

$$\|f_r-f\|_2 \rightarrow 0.$$

The orthogonal projection P of L^{2}(T) onto H^{2}(T) is called the Szegő projection. It is a bounded operator on L^{2}(T) with operator norm 1. By Cauchy's integral formula,

$$F(z)= {1\over 2\pi i} \int_{|\zeta|=1}  \frac{f(\zeta)}{ \zeta -z} \,d\zeta={1\over 2\pi} \int_{-\pi}^{\pi} {f(\theta) \over 1-e^{-i\theta}z} \, d\theta.$$

Thus

$$F(re^{i\varphi})={1\over 2\pi} \int_{-\pi}^{\pi} {f(\varphi-\theta) \over 1-re^{i\theta}} \, d\theta.$$

When r = 1, the integrand on the right-hand side has a singularity at θ = 0. The truncated Hilbert transform is defined by

$$H_\varepsilon f(\varphi) = {i\over \pi} \int_{\varepsilon\le |\theta| \le  \pi} {f(\varphi-\theta) \over 1-e^{i\theta}} \, d\theta={1\over \pi} \int_{|\zeta-e^{i\varphi}|\ge \delta} {f(\zeta)\over \zeta-e^{i\varphi}}\, d\zeta,$$

where δ = |1 – e^{iε}|. Since it is defined as convolution with a bounded function, it is a bounded operator on L^{2}(T). Now

$$H_\varepsilon{1}={i\over\pi}\int_\varepsilon^\pi 2 \Re (1-e^{i\theta})^{-1} \,  d\theta ={i\over\pi}\int_\varepsilon^\pi 1 \, d\theta = i - {i \varepsilon\over \pi}.$$

If f is a polynomial in z then

$$H_\varepsilon f(z) - {i(1-\varepsilon)\over \pi} f(z)={1\over \pi i} \int_{|\zeta -z|\ge \delta} {f(\zeta)-f(z)\over \zeta -z} \, d\zeta.$$

By Cauchy's theorem the right-hand side tends to 0 uniformly as ε, and hence δ, tends to 0. So

$$H_\varepsilon f \rightarrow if$$

uniformly for polynomials. On the other hand, if u(z) = z it is immediate that

$$\overline{H_\varepsilon f} = - u^{-1} H_\varepsilon( u \overline{f}).$$

Thus if f is a polynomial in z^{−1} without constant term

$H_\varepsilon f \rightarrow -i f$ uniformly.

Define the Hilbert transform on the circle by
$$H = i(2P-I).$$

Thus if f is a trigonometric polynomial

$H_\varepsilon f \rightarrow Hf$ uniformly.

It follows that if f is any L^{2} function

$H_\varepsilon f \rightarrow Hf$ in the L^{2} norm.

This is an immediate consequence of the result for trigonometric polynomials once it is established that the operators H_{ε} are uniformly bounded in operator norm. But on [–π,π]

$$(1-e^{i\theta})^{-1}= [(1-e^{i\theta})^{-1} -i\theta^{-1}] +i\theta^{-1}.$$

The first term is bounded on the whole of [–π,π], so it suffices to show that the convolution operators S_{ε} defined by

$$S_\varepsilon f(\varphi) = \int_{\varepsilon \le |\theta|\le \pi} f(\varphi-\theta)\theta^{-1}\,d\theta$$

are uniformly bounded. With respect to the orthonormal basis e^{inθ} convolution operators are diagonal and their operator norms are given by taking the supremum of the moduli of the Fourier coefficients. Direct computation shows that these all have the form

$$\frac{1}{\pi}\left |\int_a^b {\sin t \over t}\, dt\right|$$

with 0 < a < b. These integrals are well known to be uniformly bounded.

It also follows that, for a continuous function f on the circle, H_{ε}f converges uniformly to Hf, so in particular pointwise. The pointwise limit is a Cauchy principal value, written

$$Hf= \mathrm{P.V.}\,{1\over \pi} \int {f(\zeta)\over \zeta-e^{i\varphi}}\, d\zeta.$$

If f is just in L^{2} then H_{ε}f converges to Hf pointwise almost everywhere. In fact define the Poisson operators on L^{2} functions by

$$T_r \left (\sum a_n e^{in\theta} \right )=\sum r^{|n|} a_n e^{in\theta},$$

for r < 1. Since these operators are diagonal, it is easy to see that T_{r}f tends to f in L^{2} as r increases to 1. Moreover, as Lebesgue proved, T_{r}f also tends pointwise to f at each Lebesgue point of f. On the other hand, it is also known that T_{r}Hf − H_{1 − r} f tends to zero at each Lebesgue point of f. Hence H_{1 – r} f tends pointwise to f on the common Lebesgue points of f and Hf and therefore almost everywhere.

Results of this kind on pointwise convergence are proved more generally below for L^{p} functions using the Poisson operators and the Hardy–Littlewood maximal function of f.

The Hilbert transform has a natural compatibility with orientation-preserving diffeomorphisms of the circle. Thus if H is a diffeomorphism of the circle with

$$H(e^{i\theta})=e^{ih(\theta)},\,\,\, h(\theta+2\pi)=h(\theta)+2\pi,$$

then the operators

$$H_\varepsilon^h f(e^{i\varphi})=\frac{1}{\pi}\int_{|e^{ih(\theta)} -e^{ih(\varphi)}|\ge \varepsilon} \frac{f(e^{i\theta})}{e^{i\theta}-e^{i\varphi}}e^{i\theta}\, d\theta,$$

are uniformly bounded and tend in the strong operator topology to H. Moreover, if Vf(z) = f(H(z)), then VHV^{−1} − H is an operator with smooth kernel, so a Hilbert–Schmidt operator.

In fact if G is the inverse of H with corresponding function g(θ), then

$$(VH^h_\varepsilon V^{-1}- H_\varepsilon) f(e^{i\varphi}) = {1\over \pi}\int_{|e^{i\theta}-e^{i\varphi}| \ge \varepsilon}\left[{g^\prime(\theta) e^{ig(\theta)} \over e^{ig(\theta)} - e^{ig(\varphi)}} - {e^{i\theta} \over e^{i\theta} - e^{i\varphi} }\right]\,f(e^{i\theta})\, d\theta.$$

Since the kernel on the right hand side is smooth on T × T, it follows that the operators on the right hand side are uniformly bounded and hence so too are the operators H_{ε}^{h}. To see that they tend strongly to H, it suffices to check this on trigonometric polynomials. In that case

$$H^h_\varepsilon f(\zeta)={1\over \pi i} \int_{|H(z)-H(\zeta)|\ge \varepsilon} \frac{f(z)}{z -\zeta} dz= {1\over \pi i} \int_{|H(z)-H(\zeta)|\ge \varepsilon} {f(z)-f(\zeta)\over z -\zeta}\, dz + \frac{f(\zeta)}{\pi i} \int_{|H(z)-H(\zeta)|\ge \varepsilon} {dz\over z -\zeta}.$$

In the first integral the integrand is a trigonometric polynomial in z and ζ and so the integral is a trigonometric polynomial in ζ. It tends in L^{2} to the trigonometric polynomial
$${1\over \pi i} \int {f(z)-f(\zeta)\over z -\zeta}\, dz.$$

The integral in the second term can be calculated by the argument principle. It tends in L^{2} to the constant function 1, so that

$$\lim_{\varepsilon\to 0} H_\varepsilon^h f(\zeta) = f(\zeta) + {1\over \pi i} \int {f(z)-f(\zeta)\over z -\zeta}\, dz,$$

where the limit is in L^{2}. On the other hand, the right hand side is independent of the diffeomorphism. Since for the identity diffeomorphism, the left hand side equals Hf, it too equals Hf (this can also be checked directly if f is a trigonometric polynomial). Finally, letting ε → 0,

$$(VH V^{-1}- H) f(e^{i\varphi}) = \frac{1}{\pi} \int \left[{g^\prime(\theta) e^{ig(\theta)} \over e^{ig(\theta)} - e^{ig(\varphi)}} - {e^{i\theta} \over e^{i\theta} - e^{i\varphi}}\right]\,f(e^{i\theta})\, d\theta.$$

The direct method of evaluating Fourier coefficients to prove the uniform boundedness of the operator H^{ε} does not generalize directly to L^{p} spaces with 1 < p < ∞. Instead a direct comparison of H^{ε}f with the Poisson integral of the Hilbert transform is used classically to prove this. If f has Fourier series

$$f(e^{i\theta})=\sum_{n\in \mathbf{Z}} a_n e^{in\theta},$$

its Poisson integral is defined by

$$P_rf(e^{i\theta})=\sum_{n\in \mathbf{Z}} a_n r^{|n|} e^{in\theta}={1\over 2\pi}\int_0^{2\pi} {(1-r^2)f(e^{i\theta})\over 1-2r\cos\theta + r^2}\,d\theta =K_r\star f(e^{i\theta}),$$

where the Poisson kernel K_{r} is given by
$$K_r(e^{i\theta})=\sum_{n\in \mathbf{Z}} r^{|n|}e^{in\theta} ={1-r^2\over 1 - 2r\cos\theta + r^2}.$$

In f is in L^{p}(T) then the operators P_{r} satisfy
$$\|P_rf - f\|_p\rightarrow 0.$$

In fact the K_{r} are positive so
$$\|K_r\|_1 ={1\over 2\pi} \int_0^{2\pi} K_r(e^{i\theta})\, d\theta = 1.$$

Thus the operators P_{r} have operator norm bounded by 1 on L^{p}. The convergence statement above follows by continuity from the result for trigonometric polynomials, where it is an immediate consequence of the formula for the Fourier coefficients of K_{r}.

The uniform boundedness of the operator norm of H_{ε} follows because HP_{r} − H_{1−r} is given as convolution by the function ψ_{r}, where
$$\begin{align}
\psi_r(e^{i\theta}) &=1+\frac{1-r}{1+ r} \cot \left(\tfrac{\theta}{2} \right ) K_r(e^{i\theta}) \\
&\le 1+ \frac{1-r}{1+r} \cot \left (\tfrac{1-r}{2} \right ) K_r(e^{i\theta})
\end{align}$$
for 1 − r ≤ |θ| ≤ π, and, for |θ| < 1 − r,
$$\psi_r(e^{i\theta})=1+ {2r\sin \theta\over 1-2r\cos\theta +r^2}.$$

These estimates show that the L^{1} norms ∫ |ψ_{r}| are uniformly bounded. Since H is a bounded operator, it follows that the operators H_{ε} are uniformly bounded in operator norm on L^{2}(T). The same argument can be used on L^{p}(T) once it is known that the Hilbert transform H is bounded in operator norm on L^{p}(T).

=== Hilbert transform on the real line ===
As in the case of the circle, the theory for L^{2} functions is particularly easy to develop. In fact, as observed by Rosenblum and Devinatz, the two Hilbert transforms can be related using the Cayley transform.

The Hilbert transform H_{R} on L^{2}(R) is defined by
$$\widehat{H_{\mathbf{R}} f} = \left (i\chi_{[0,\infty)} -i\chi_{(-\infty,0]} \right ) \widehat{f},$$
where the Fourier transform is given by
$$\widehat{f}(t)={1\over \sqrt{2\pi}}\int_{-\infty}^\infty f(x) e^{-itx} \, dx.$$

Define the Hardy space H^{2}(R) to be the closed subspace of L^{2}(R) consisting of functions for which the Fourier transform vanishes on the negative part of the real axis. Its orthogonal complement is given by functions for which the Fourier transform vanishes on the positive part of the real axis. It is the complex conjugate of H^{2}(R). If P_{R} is the orthogonal projection onto H^{2}(R), then

$$H_{\mathbf{R}}=i(2P_{\mathbf{R}}-I).$$

The Cayley transform
$$C(x)={x-i\over x+i}$$
carries the extended real line onto the circle, sending the point at ∞ to 1, and the upper halfplane onto the unit disk.

Define the unitary operator from L^{2}(T) onto L^{2}(R) by
$$Uf(x)=\pi^{-1/2} (x+i)^{-1} f(C(x)).$$

This operator carries the Hardy space of the circle H^{2}(T) onto H^{2}(R). In fact for |w| < 1, the linear span of the functions
$$f_w(z)= \frac{1}{1-w z}$$
is dense in H^{2}(T). Moreover,
$$Uf_w(x) = \frac{1}{\sqrt{\pi}} \frac{1}{(1-w)(x-\overline{z})}$$
where
$$z=C^{-1}(\overline{w}).$$

On the other hand, for z ∈ H, the linear span of the functions
$$g_z(t)=e^{itz}\chi_{[0,\infty)}(t)$$
is dense in L^{2}((0,∞)). By the Fourier inversion formula, they are the Fourier transforms of
$$h_z(x)=\widehat{g_z}(-x)={i\over \sqrt{2\pi}} (x + z)^{-1},$$
so the linear span of these functions is dense in H^{2}(R). Since U carries the f_{w}'s onto multiples of the h_{z}'s, it follows that U carries H^{2}(T) onto H^{2}(R). Thus
$$UH_{\mathbf{T}} U^* = H_{\mathbf{R}}.$$

In Nikolski (1986), part of the L^{2} theory on the real line and the upper halfplane is developed by transferring the results from the circle and the unit disk. The natural replacements for concentric circles in the disk are lines parallel to the real axis in H. Under the Cayley transform, these correspond to circles in the disk that are tangent to the unit circle at the point one. The behaviour of functions in H^{2}(T) on these circles is part of the theory of Carleson measures. However, the theory of singular integrals can be developed more easily by working directly on R.

H^{2}(R) consists exactly of L^{2} functions f that arise of boundary values of holomorphic functions on H in the following sense: f is in H^{2} provided that there is a holomorphic function F(z) on H such that the functions f_{y}(x) = f(x + iy) for y > 0 are in L^{2} and f_{y} tends to f in L^{2} as y → 0. In this case F is necessarily unique and given by Cauchy's integral formula:

$$F(z)={1\over 2\pi i}  \int_{-\infty}^\infty {f(s)\over s-z}\, ds.$$

In fact, identifying H^{2} with L^{2}(0,∞) via the Fourier transform, for y > 0 multiplication by e^{−yt} on L^{2}(0,∞) induces a contraction semigroup V_{y} on H^{2}. Hence for f in L^{2}

$${1\over 2\pi i} \int_{-\infty}^\infty {f(s)\over s-z}\, ds ={1\over \sqrt{2\pi}} \int_{-\infty}^\infty f(s) \widehat{g_z}(s) \, ds  = {1\over \sqrt{2\pi}} \int_{-\infty}^\infty \widehat{f}(s) g_z(s) \, ds= V_yPf(x).$$

If f is in H^{2}, F(z) is holomorphic for Im z > 0, since the family of L^{2} functions g_{z} depends holomorphically on z. Moreover, f_{y} = V_{y}f tends to f in H^{2} since this is true for the Fourier transforms. Conversely if such an F exists, by Cauchy's integral theorem and the above identity applied to f_{y}

$$f_{y+t} = V_t Pf_y$$

for t > 0. Letting t tend to 0, it follows that Pf_{y} = f_{y}, so that f_{y} lies in H^{2}. But then so too does the limit f. Since
$$V_t f_y=f_{y+t}=V_y f_t,$$
uniqueness of F follows from
$$f_t=\lim_{y\to 0} f_{y+t}=\lim_{y\to 0} V_t f_y = V_t f.$$

For f in L^{2}, the truncated Hilbert transforms are defined by
$$\begin{align}
H_{\varepsilon,R} f(x) &={1\over \pi}\int_{\varepsilon \le |y-x|\le R} {f(y)\over x-y} \, dy ={1\over \pi}\int_{\varepsilon \le |y|\le R} {f(x-y)\over y}\, dy \\
H_{\varepsilon} f(x) &={1\over \pi}\int_{ |y-x|\ge \varepsilon} {f(y)\over x-y} \, dy ={1\over \pi} \int_{ |y|\ge \varepsilon} {f(x-y)\over y}\, dy.
\end{align}$$

The operators H_{ε,R} are convolutions by bounded functions of compact support, so their operator norms are given by the uniform norm of their Fourier transforms. As before the absolute values have the form

$${1\over \sqrt{2\pi}}\left|\int_a^b { 2 \sin t \over t} \, dt\right|.$$

with 0 < a < b, so the operators H_{ε,R} are uniformly bounded in operator norm. Since H_{ε,R}f tends to H_{ε}f in L^{2} for f with compact support, and hence for arbitrary f, the operators H_{ε} are also uniformly bounded in operator norm.

To prove that H_{ε} f tends to Hf as ε tends to zero, it suffices to check this on a dense set of functions. On the other hand,

$$\overline{H_\varepsilon f} = -  H_\varepsilon( \overline{f}),$$

so it suffices to prove that H_{ε}f tends to if for a dense set of functions in H^{2}(R), for example the Fourier transforms of smooth functions g with compact support in (0,∞). But the Fourier transform f extends to an entire function F on C, which is bounded on Im(z) ≥ 0. The same is true of the derivatives of g. Up to a scalar these correspond to multiplying F(z) by powers of z. Thus F satisfies a Paley-Wiener estimate for Im(z) ≥ 0:

$$|F^{(m)}(z)| \le K_{N,m} (1+|z|)^{-N}$$

for any m, N ≥ 0. In particular, the integral defining H_{ε}f(x) can be computed by taking a standard semicircle contour centered on x. It consists of a large semicircle with radius R and a small circle radius ε with the two portions of the real axis between them. By Cauchy's theorem, the integral round the contour is zero. The integral round the large contour tends to zero by the Paley-Wiener estimate. The integral on the real axis is the limit sought. It is therefore given as minus the limit on the small semicircular contour. But this is the limit of

$${1\over \pi} \int_{\Gamma} {F(z)\over z-x} \, dz.$$

Where Γ is the small semicircular contour, oriented anticlockwise. By the usual techniques of contour integration, this limit equals if(x). In this case, it is easy to check that the convergence is dominated in L^{2} since

$$H_\varepsilon f(x)=\frac{1}{\pi}\int_{|y-x|\ge \varepsilon} \frac{f(y)-f(x)}{y-x}\,dy = \frac{1}{\pi} \int_{|y-x|\ge \varepsilon} \int_0^1 f^\prime(x+t(y-x))\,dt\, dy$$

so that convergence is dominated by
$$G(x)=\frac{1}{2\pi} \int_0^1\int_{-\infty}^\infty |f^\prime(x+ty)|\,dy$$
which is in L^{2} by the Paley-Wiener estimate.

It follows that for f on L^{2}(R)
$$H_\varepsilon f \rightarrow H f.$$

This can also be deduced directly because, after passing to Fourier transforms, H_{ε} and H become multiplication operators by uniformly bounded functions. The multipliers for H_{ε} tend pointwise almost everywhere to the multiplier for H, so the statement above follows from the dominated convergence theorem applied to the Fourier transforms.

As for the Hilbert transform on the circle, H_{ε}f tends to Hf pointwise almost everywhere if f is an L^{2} function. In fact, define the Poisson operators on L^{2} functions by

$$T_y f(x)=\int_{-\infty}^\infty P_y(x-t)f(t)\, dt,$$

where the Poisson kernel is given by

$$P_y(x)=\frac{y}{\pi( x^2 +y^2)}.$$

for y > 0. Its Fourier transform is
$$\widehat{P_y}(t)=e^{-y|t|},$$

from which it is easy to see that T_{y}f tends to f in L^{2} as y increases to 0. Moreover, as Lebesgue proved, T_{y}f also tends pointwise to f at each Lebesgue point of f. On the other hand, it is also known that T_{y}Hf – H_{y}f tends to zero at each Lebesgue point of f. Hence H_{ε}f tends pointwise to f on the common Lebesgue points of f and Hf and therefore almost everywhere. The absolute values of the functions T_{y}f − f and T_{y}Hf – H_{y}f can be bounded pointwise by multiples of the maximal function of f.

As for the Hilbert transform on the circle, the uniform boundedness of the operator norms of H_{ε} follows from that of the T_{ε} if H is known to be bounded, since HT_{ε} − H_{ε} is the convolution operator by the function

$$g_\varepsilon(x) = \begin{cases}
\frac{x}{\pi( x^2 +\varepsilon^2)} & |x|\le \varepsilon \\
\frac{x}{\pi( x^2 +\varepsilon^2)} -\frac{1}{\pi x} & |x| >\varepsilon
\end{cases}$$

The L^{1} norms of these functions are uniformly bounded.

=== Riesz transforms in the complex plane ===
The complex Riesz transforms R and R* in the complex plane are the unitary operators on L^{2}(C) defined as multiplication by z/|z| and its conjugate on the Fourier transform of an L^{2} function f:

$$\widehat{Rf}(z)={\overline{z}\over |z|} \widehat{f}(z),\,\,\, \widehat{R^*f}(z)={z\over |z|} \widehat{f}(z).$$

Identifying C with R^{2}, R and R* are given by

$$R=-iR_1 + R_2,\,\,\, R^*=-iR_1 - R_2,$$

where R_{1} and R_{2} are the Riesz transforms on R^{2} defined below.

On L^{2}(C), the operator R and its integer powers are unitary. They can also be expressed as singular integral operators:

$${R^kf(w)=\lim_{\varepsilon\to 0} \int_{|z-w|\ge \varepsilon} M_k(w-z)f(z)\,dx\, dy,}$$

where
$$M_k(z)={k\over 2\pi i^k} {z^k \over |z|^{k+2}} \,\,\,\, (k\ge 1), \,\,\,\, M_{-k}(z) =\overline{M_k(z)}.$$

Defining the truncated higher Riesz transforms as
$${R^{(k)}_\varepsilon f(w)=\int_{|z-w|\ge \varepsilon} M_k(w-z)f(z)\,dx\, dy,}$$
these operators can be shown to be uniformly bounded in operator norm. For odd powers this can be deduced by the method of rotation of Calderón and Zygmund, described below. If the operators are known to be bounded in operator norm it can also be deduced using the Poisson operators.

The Poisson operators T_{s} on R^{2} are defined for s > 0 by

$${T_sf(x) ={1\over 2\pi}\int_{\mathbf{R}^2} {s f(x)\over (|x-t|^2 + s^2)^{3/2}}\, dt.}$$

They are given by convolution with the functions

$${P_s(x)= {s\over 2\pi(|x|^2 + s^2)^{3/2} }.}$$

P_{s} is the Fourier transform of the function e^{− s|x|}, so under the Fourier transform they correspond to multiplication by these functions and form a contraction semigroup on L^{2}(R^{2}). Since P_{y} is positive and integrable with integral 1, the operators T_{s} also define a contraction semigroup on each L^{p} space with 1 < p < ∞.

The higher Riesz transforms of the Poisson kernel can be computed:

$${R^kP_s(z)={k\over 2\pi i^k} {z^k \over (|z|^2 +s^2)^{k/2+1}}}$$

for k ≥ 1 and the complex conjugate for − k. Indeed, the right hand side is a harmonic function F(x,y,s) of three variable and for such functions

$${T_{s_1} F(x,y,s_2) = F(x,y,s_1+s_2).}$$

As before the operators

$${T_\varepsilon R^k - R^{(k)}_\varepsilon}$$

are given by convolution with integrable functions and have uniformly bounded operator norms. Since the Riesz transforms are unitary on L^{2}(C), the uniform boundedness of the truncated Riesz transforms implies that they converge in the strong operator topology to the corresponding Riesz transforms.

The uniform boundedness of the difference between the transform and the truncated transform can also be seen for odd k using the Calderón-Zygmund method of rotation. The group T acts by rotation on functions on C via
$${U_\theta f(z)=f(e^{i\theta}z).}$$

This defines a unitary representation on L^{2}(C) and the unitary operators R_{θ} commute with the Fourier transform. If A is a bounded operator on L^{2}(R) then it defines a bounded operator A^{(1)} on L^{2}(C) simply by making A act on the first coordinate. With the identification L^{2}(R^{2}) = L^{2}(R) ⊗ L^{2}(R), A^{(1)} = A ⊗ I. If φ is a continuous function on the circle then a new operator can be defined by
$${B ={1\over 2\pi} \int_0^{2\pi} \varphi(\theta) U_\theta A^{(1)} U_\theta^* \, d\theta.}$$

This definition is understood in the sense that
$${(Bf,g) ={1\over 2\pi} \int_0^{2\pi} \varphi(\theta) (U_\theta A^{(1)} U_\theta^*f,g) \, d\theta}$$

for any f, g in L^{2}(C). It follows that
$${\| B \| \le {1\over 2\pi} \int_0^{2\pi} |\varphi(\theta)| \cdot\|A\|\, d\theta.}$$

Taking A to be the Hilbert transform H on L^{2}(R) or its truncation H_{ε}, it follows that
$$\begin{align}
R &={1\over 2\pi} \int_0^{2\pi} e^{-i\theta} U_\theta H^{(1)} U_\theta^* \, d\theta,\\
R_\varepsilon &={1\over 2\pi} \int_0^{2\pi} e^{-i\theta} U_\theta H^{(1)}_\varepsilon U_\theta^* \, d\theta.
\end{align}$$

Taking adjoints gives a similar formula for R* and its truncation. This gives a second way to verify estimates of the norms of R, R* and their truncations. It has the advantage of being applicable also for L^{p} spaces.

The Poisson operators can also be used to show that the truncated higher Riesz transforms of a function tend to the higher Riesz transform at the common Lebesgue points of the function and its transform. Indeed, (R^{k}T_{ε} − R^{(k)}_{ε})f → 0 at each Lebesgue point of f; while (R^{k} − R^{k}T_{ε})f → 0 at each Lebesgue point of R^{k}f.

=== Beurling transform in the complex plane ===
Since

$${\overline{z}\over z}= \left({\overline{z}\over |z|}\right)^2,$$

the Beurling transform T on L^{2} is the unitary operator equal to R^{2}. This relation has been used classically in Vekua (1962) and Ahlfors (1966) to establish the continuity properties of T on L^{p} spaces. The results on the Riesz transform and its powers show that T is the limit in the strong operator topology of the truncated operators
$$T_\varepsilon f(w)=-\frac{1}{\pi}\iint_{|z-w|\ge \varepsilon} \frac{f(z)}{(w-z)^2} dxdy.$$

Accordingly, Tf can be written as a Cauchy principal value integral:

$$Tf(w)=-\frac{1}{\pi} P.V. \iint \frac{f(z)}{(w-z)^2} dxdy=-\frac{1}{\pi}\lim_{\varepsilon \to 0}\iint_{|z-w|\ge \varepsilon} \frac{f(z)}{(w-z)^2} dx \, dy.$$

From the description of T and T* on Fourier transforms, it follows that if f is smooth of compact support

$$\begin{align}
T(\partial_z f) &=\partial_z T(f), \\
T(\partial_{\overline{z}}f) &=\partial_{\overline{z}} T(f).
\end{align}$$

Like the Hilbert transform in one dimension, the Beurling transform has a compatibility with conformal changes of coordinate. Let Ω be a bounded region in C with smooth boundary ∂Ω and let φ be a univalent holomorphic map of the unit disk D onto Ω extending to a smooth diffeomorphism of the circle onto ∂Ω. If χ_{Ω} is the characteristic function of Ω, the operator can χ_{Ω}Tχ_{Ω} defines an operator T(Ω) on L^{2}(Ω). Through the conformal map φ, it induces an operator, also denoted T(Ω), on L^{2}(D) which can be compared with T(D). The same is true of the truncations T_{ε}(Ω) and T_{ε}(D).

Let U_{ε} be the disk |z − w| < ε and V^{ε} the region |φ(z) − φ(w)| < ε. On L^{2}(D)
$$\begin{align}
T_\varepsilon(\Omega)f(w) &= -\frac{1}{\pi} \iint_{D\backslash V_\varepsilon} \left [{\varphi^\prime(w)\varphi^\prime(z) \over (\varphi(z)-\varphi(w))^2}f(z)\right ] dx\,dy,\\
T_\varepsilon(D)f(w) &=-{1\over \pi} \iint_{D\backslash U_\varepsilon} {f(z) \over (z-w)^2} \,dx \, dy,
\end{align}$$

and the operator norms of these truncated operators are uniformly bounded. On the other hand, if

$$T^\prime_\varepsilon(D)f(w) = -{1\over \pi} \iint_{D\backslash V_\varepsilon} \frac{f(z)}{(z-w)^2} dx \, dy,$$

then the difference between this operator and T_{ε}(Ω) is a truncated operator with smooth kernel K(w,z):

$$K(w,z)=-{1\over \pi} \left[{\varphi'(w)\varphi'(z)\over (\varphi(z)-\varphi(w))^2} -{1\over (z-w)^2}\right].$$

So the operators T′_{ε}(D) must also have uniformly bounded operator norms. To see that their difference tends to 0 in the strong operator topology, it is enough to check this for f smooth of compact support in D. By Green's theorem

$$\left (T_\varepsilon(D)-T^\prime_\varepsilon(D) \right )f(w)= \frac{1}{\pi}\iint_{U_\varepsilon} {\partial_zf(z)\over z-w }dx \, dy-{1\over \pi}\iint_{V_\varepsilon} {\partial_zf(z)\over z-w} dx \, dy+{1\over 2\pi i}\int_{\partial U_\varepsilon} \frac{f(z)}{z-w}d\overline{z}-\frac{1}{2\pi i}\int_{\partial V_\varepsilon} {f(z)\over z-w}\, d\overline{z}.$$

All four terms on the right hand side tend to 0. Hence the difference T(Ω) − T(D) is the Hilbert–Schmidt operator with kernel K.

For pointwise convergence there is simple argument due to Mateu & Verdera (2006) showing that the truncated integrals converge to Tf precisely at its Lebesgue points, that is almost everywhere. In fact T has the following symmetry property for f, g ∈ L^{2}(C)

$$\iint (Tf) g = -{1\over \pi}\lim \int_{|z-w|\ge \varepsilon} \frac{f(w)g(z)}{(w-z)^2} =\iint f (Tg).$$

On the other hand, if χ is the characteristic function of the disk D(z,ε) with centre z and radius ε, then

$$T\chi(w) = -\varepsilon^2 \frac{1-\chi(w)}{(w-z)^2}.$$

Hence
$$T_\varepsilon(f)(z)={1\over \pi\varepsilon^2}\iint f (T\chi)= {1\over \pi\varepsilon^2}\iint (Tf)\chi = \mathbf{Av}_{D(z,\varepsilon)}\, Tf.$$

By the Lebesgue differentiation theorem, the right-hand side converges to Tf at the Lebesgue points of Tf.

=== Riesz transforms in higher dimensions ===
For f in the Schwartz space of R^{n}, the jth Riesz transform is defined by

$$R_j f(x) =c_n\lim_{\varepsilon \to 0} \int_{|y|\ge \varepsilon} f(x-y){y_j\over |y|^{n+1}}dy= \frac{c_n}{n-1}\int \partial_j f(x-y){1\over |y|^{n-1}} dy,$$

where
$$c_n=\Gamma\left(\tfrac{n+1}{2}\right)\pi^{-\frac{n+1}{2}}.$$

Under the Fourier transform:

$$\widehat{R_j f}(t)={it_j\over |t|}\widehat{f}(t).$$

Thus R_{j} corresponds to the operator ∂_{j}Δ^{−1/2}, where Δ = −∂_{1}^{2} − ⋯ −∂_{n}^{2} denotes the Laplacian on R^{n}. By definition R_{j} is a bounded and skew-adjoint operator for the L^{2} norm and

$$R_1^2 + \cdots + R_n^2 = -I.$$

The corresponding truncated operators
$$R_{j,\varepsilon} f(x) =c_n\int_{|y|\ge \varepsilon} f(x-y){y_j\over |y|^{n+1}} dy$$
are uniformly bounded in the operator norm. This can either be proved directly or can be established by the Calderón−Zygmund method of rotations for the group SO(n). This expresses the operators R_{j} and their truncations in terms of the Hilbert transforms in one dimension and its truncations. In fact if G = SO(n) with normalised Haar measure and H^{(1)} is the Hilbert transform in the first coordinate, then

$$\begin{align}
R_j &=\int_G \varphi(g) gH^{(1)}g^{-1} \, dg, \\
R_{j,\varepsilon} &=\int_G \varphi(g) gH_\varepsilon^{(1)} g^{-1} \, dg, \\
R_{j,\varepsilon,R} &=\int_G \varphi(g) gH_{\varepsilon,R}^{(1)} g^{-1} \, dg.
\end{align}$$

where φ(g) is the (1,j) matrix coefficient of g.

In particular for f ∈ L^{2}, R_{j,ε}f → R_{j}f in L^{2}. Moreover, R_{j,ε}f tends to R_{j} almost everywhere. This can be proved exactly as for the Hilbert transform by using the Poisson operators defined on L^{2}(R^{n}) when R^{n} is regarded as the boundary of a halfspace in R^{n+1}. Alternatively it can be proved directly from the result for the Hilbert transform on R using the expression of R_{j} as an integral over G.

The Poisson operators T_{y} on R^{n} are defined for y > 0 by

$$T_yf(x) =c_n\int_{\mathbf{R}^n} \frac{y f(x)}{\left (|x-t|^2 + y^2 \right )^{\frac{n+1}{2}}} dt.$$

They are given by convolution with the functions
$$P_y(x)=c_n \frac{y}{\left (|x|^2 + y^2 \right )^{\frac{n+1}{2}}}.$$

P_{y} is the Fourier transform of the function e^{−y|x|}, so under the Fourier transform they correspond to multiplication by these functions and form a contraction semigroup on L^{2}(R^{n}). Since P_{y} is positive and integrable with integral 1, the operators T_{y} also define a contraction semigroup on each L^{p} space with 1 < p < ∞.

The Riesz transforms of the Poisson kernel can be computed

$$R_j P_\varepsilon(x)= c_n \frac{x_j}{\left(|x|^2 + \varepsilon^2 \right)^{\frac{n+1}{2}}}.$$

The operator R_{j}T_{ε} is given by convolution with this function. It can be checked directly that the operators R_{j}T_{ε} − R_{j,ε} are given by convolution with functions uniformly bounded in L^{1} norm. The operator norm of the difference is therefore uniformly bounded. We have (R_{j}T_{ε} − R_{j,ε})f → 0 at each Lebesgue point of f; while (R_{j} − R_{j}T_{ε})f → 0 at each Lebesgue point of R_{j}f. So R_{j,ε}f → R_{j}f on the common Lebesgue points of f and R_{j}f.

== L^{p} theory ==
=== Elementary proofs of M. Riesz theorem ===
The theorem of Marcel Riesz asserts that singular integral operators that are continuous for the L^{2} norm are also continuous in the L^{p} norm for 1 < p < ∞ and that the operator norms vary continuously with p.

==== Bochner's proof for Hilbert transform on the circle ====
Once it is established that the operator norms of the Hilbert transform on L^{p}(T) are bounded for even integers, it follows from the Riesz–Thorin interpolation theorem and duality that they are bounded for all p with 1 < p < ∞ and that the norms vary continuously with p. Moreover, the arguments with the Poisson integral can be applied to show that the truncated Hilbert transforms H_{ε} are uniformly bounded in operator norm and converge in the strong operator topology to H.

It is enough to prove the bound for real trigonometric polynomials without constant term:

$$f \left (e^{i\theta} \right ) = \sum_{m=1}^N a_m e^{im\theta} + a_{-m} e^{-im\theta}, \qquad a_{-m}=\overline{a_m}.$$

Since f + iHf is a polynomial in e^{iθ} without constant term

$$\frac{1}{2\pi}\int_0^{2\pi} (f+iHf)^{2n} \, d\theta = 0.$$

Hence, taking the real part and using Hölder's inequality:

$$\|Hf\|_{2n}^{2n} \le \sum_{k=0}^{n-1} {2n\choose 2k} \left | \left ((Hf)^{2k},f^{2n-2k} \right ) \right |\le \sum_{k=0}^{n-1} {2n\choose 2k} \|Hf\|_{2n}^{2k}\cdot\|f\|_{2n}^{2n-2k}.$$

So the M. Riesz theorem follows by induction for p an even integer and hence for all p with 1 < p < ∞.

==== Cotlar's proof for Hilbert transform on the line ====
Once it is established that the operator norms of the Hilbert transform on L^{p}(R) are bounded when p is a power of 2, it follows from the Riesz–Thorin interpolation theorem and duality that they are bounded for all p with 1 < p < ∞ and that the norms vary continuously with p. Moreover, the arguments with the Poisson integral can be applied to show that the truncated Hilbert transforms H_{ε} are uniformly bounded in operator norm and converge in the strong operator topology to H.

It is enough to prove the bound when f is a Schwartz function. In that case the following identity of Cotlar holds:

$$(Hf)^2= f^2 + 2H(fH(f)).$$

In fact, write f = f_{+} + f_{−} according to the ±i eigenspaces of H. Since f ± iHf extend to holomorphic functions in the upper and lower half plane, so too do their squares. Hence

$$f^2 -(Hf)^2= \left (f_+ + f_- \right )^2 + \left (f_+-f_- \right )^2 =2 \left (f_+^2 + f_-^2 \right )=-2iH \left (f_+^2 -f_-^2 \right )=-2H(f(Hf)).$$

(Cotlar's identity can also be verified directly by taking Fourier transforms.)

Hence, assuming the M. Riesz theorem for p = 2^{n},

$$\|Hf\|^2_{2^{n+1}} = \left \|(Hf)^2 \right \|_{2^n} \le \left \|f^2 \right \|_{2^n} + 2 \|H(fH(f))\|_{2^n} \le \|f\|_{2^{n+1}}^2 + 2 \|H\|_{2^n} \|f\|_{2^{n+1}} \|Hf\|_{2^{n+1}}.$$

Since

$$R^2 > 1 + 2 \|H\|_{2^n} R$$

for R sufficiently large, the M. Riesz theorem must also hold for p = 2^{n+1}.

Exactly the same method works for the Hilbert transform on the circle. The same identity of Cotlar is easily verified on trigonometric polynomials f by writing them as the sum of the terms with non-negative and negative exponents, i.e. the ±i eigenfunctions of H. The L^{p} bounds can therefore be established when p is a power of 2 and follow in general by interpolation and duality.

==== Calderón–Zygmund method of rotation ====
The method of rotation for Riesz transforms and their truncations applies equally well on L^{p} spaces for 1 < p < ∞. Thus these operators can be expressed in terms of the Hilbert transform on R and its truncations. The integration of the functions Φ from the group T or SO(n) into the space of operators on L^{p} is taken in the weak sense:

$$\left (\int_G \Phi(x)\, dx\, f,g \right ) =\int_G (\Phi(x)f,g)\, dx$$

where f lies in L^{p} and g lies in the dual space L^{q} with 1/p + 1/q = 1. It follows that Riesz transforms are bounded on L^{p} and that the differences with their truncations are also uniformly bounded. The continuity of the L^{p} norms of a fixed Riesz transform is a consequence of the Riesz–Thorin interpolation theorem.

=== Pointwise convergence ===
The proofs of pointwise convergence for Hilbert and Riesz transforms rely on the Lebesgue differentiation theorem, which can be proved using the Hardy-Littlewood maximal function. The techniques for the simplest and best-known case, namely the Hilbert transform on the circle, are a prototype for all the other transforms. This case is explained in detail here.

Let f be in L^{p}(T) for p > 1. The Lebesgue differentiation theorem states that

$${A(\varepsilon)= {1\over 2\varepsilon}\int_{x-\varepsilon}^{x+\varepsilon} |f(t)-f(x)| \, dt \to 0}$$

for almost all x in T. The points at which this holds are called the Lebesgue points of f. Using this theorem it follows that if f is an integrable function on the circle, the Poisson integral T_{r}f tends pointwise to f at each Lebesgue point of f. In fact, for x fixed, A(ε) is a continuous function on [0,π]. Continuity at 0 follows because x is a Lebesgue point and elsewhere because, if h is an integrable function, the integral of |h| on intervals of decreasing length tends to 0 by Hölder's inequality.

Letting r = 1 − ε, the difference can be estimated by two integrals:

$$2\pi|T_{r}f(x) - f(x)|=\int_{0}^{2\pi} |(f(x-y)-f(x))P_r(y)|\, dy\le \int_{|y|\le \varepsilon} + \int_{|y|\ge \varepsilon}.$$

The Poisson kernel has two important properties for ε small

$$\begin{align}
\sup_{y\in [-\varepsilon,\varepsilon]} |P_{1-\varepsilon}(y)| &\le \varepsilon^{-1}. \\
\sup_{y\notin (-\varepsilon,\varepsilon)} |P_{1-\varepsilon}(y)| &\to 0.
\end{align}$$

The first integral is bounded by A(ε) by the first inequality so tends to zero as ε goes to 0; the second integral tends to 0 by the second inequality.

The same reasoning can be used to show that T_{1 − ε}Hf – H_{ε}f tends to zero at each Lebesgue point of f. In fact the operator T_{1 − ε}Hf has kernel Q_{r} + i, where the conjugate Poisson kernel Q_{r} is defined by
$${Q_r(\theta)={2r\sin \theta\over 1 -2r \cos\theta + r^2}.}$$

Hence
$${2\pi|T_{1-\varepsilon} H f(x) - H_\varepsilon f(x)|\le \int_{|y|\le \varepsilon} | f(x-y)-f(x)|\cdot|Q_r(y)|\, dy + \int_{|y|\ge \varepsilon} |f(x-y)-f(x)|\cdot |Q_1(y)-Q_r(y)|\,dy.}$$

The conjugate Poisson kernel has two important properties for ε small
$$\begin{align}
\sup_{y\in [-\varepsilon,\varepsilon]} |Q_{1-\varepsilon}(y)| &\le \varepsilon^{-1}.\\
\sup_{y\notin (-\varepsilon,\varepsilon)} |Q_1(y)-Q_{1-\varepsilon}(y)| &\to 0.
\end{align}$$

Exactly the same reasoning as before shows that the two integrals tend to 0 as ε → 0.

Combining these two limit formulas it follows that H_{ε}f tends pointwise to Hf on the common Lebesgue points of f and Hf and therefore almost everywhere.

=== Maximal functions ===
Much of the L^{p} theory has been developed using maximal functions and maximal transforms. This approach has the advantage that it also extends to L^{1} spaces in an appropriate "weak" sense and gives refined estimates in L^{p} spaces for p > 1. These finer estimates form an important part of the techniques involved in Lennart Carleson's solution in 1966 of Lusin's conjecture that the Fourier series of L^{2} functions converge almost everywhere. In the more rudimentary forms of this approach, the L^{2} theory is given less precedence: instead there is more emphasis on the L^{1} theory, in particular its measure-theoretic and probabilistic aspects; results for other L^{p} spaces are deduced by a form of interpolation between L^{1} and L^{∞} spaces. The approach is described in numerous textbooks, including the classics Zygmund (1977) and Katznelson (1968). Katznelson's account is followed here for the particular case of the Hilbert transform of functions in L^{1}(T), the case not covered by the development above. F. Riesz's proof of convexity, originally established by Hardy, is established directly without resorting to Riesz−Thorin interpolation.

If f is an L^{1} function on the circle its maximal function is defined by

$${f^*(t)=\sup_{0<h\le \pi}  {1\over 2h} \int_{t-h}^{t+h} |f(s)|\, ds.}$$

f* is finite almost everywhere and is of weak L^{1} type. In fact for λ > 0 if

$${E_f(\lambda)=\{x:\,|f(x)| > \lambda\}, \,\, f_\lambda =\chi_{E(\lambda)} f,}$$

then

$$m(E_{f^*}(\lambda))\le {8\over \lambda}\int_{E_f(\lambda)} |f|\le {8\|f\|_1\over \lambda},$$

where m denotes Lebesgue measure.

The Hardy−Littlewood inequality above leads to a proof that almost every point x of T is a Lebesgue point of an integrable function f, so that

$$\lim_{h\to 0} \frac{\int^{x+h}_{x-h}|f(t)-f(x)|\, dt}{2h} \to 0.$$

In fact, let

$$\omega(f)(x)=\limsup_{h\to 0} \frac{\int^{x+h}_{x-h}|f(t)-f(x)|\, dt}{2h} \le f^*(x) +|f(x)|.$$

If g is continuous, then the ω(g) =0, so that ω(f − g) = ω(f). On the other hand, f can be approximated arbitrarily closely in L^{1} by continuous g. Then, using Chebychev's inequality,

$$m\{x: \, \omega(f)(x)> \lambda\} =m\{x: \, \omega(f-g)(x)> \lambda\} \le m\{x: \, (f-g)^*(x)> \lambda\} + m\{x: \, |f(x)-g(x)|> \lambda\} \le C\lambda^{-1}\|f-g\|_1.$$

The right-hand side can be made arbitrarily small, so that ω(f) = 0 almost everywhere.

The Poisson integrals of an L^{1} function f satisfy

$${|T_rf|\le f^*.}$$

It follows that T_{r} f tends to f pointwise almost everywhere. In fact let

$${\Omega(f)=\limsup_{r\to 1} |T_rf -f|.}$$

If g is continuous, then the difference tends to zero everywhere, so Ω(f − g) = Ω(f). On the other hand, f can be approximated arbitrarily closely in L^{1} by continuous g. Then, using Chebychev's inequality,

$$m\{x: \, \Omega(f)(x)> \lambda\} = m\{x: \, \Omega(f-g)(x)> \lambda\} \le m\{x: \, (f-g)^*(x)> \lambda\} + m\{x: \, |f(x)-g(x)|> \lambda\} \le C\lambda^{-1}\|f-g\|_1.$$

The right-hand side can be made arbitrarily small, so that Ω(f) = 0 almost everywhere. A more refined argument shows that convergence occurs at each Lebesgue point of f.

If f is integrable the conjugate Poisson integrals are defined and given by convolution by the kernel Q_{r}. This defines Hf inside |z| < 1. To show that Hf has a radial limit for almost all angles, consider

$${F(z)=\exp (-f(z) -iHf(z)),}$$

where f(z) denotes the extension of f by Poisson integral. F is holomorphic in the unit disk with |F(z)| ≤ 1. The restriction of F to a countable family of concentric circles gives a sequence of functions in L^{∞}(T) which has a weak g limit in L^{∞}(T) with Poisson integral F. By the L^{2} results, g is the radial limit for almost all angles of F. It follows that Hf(z) has a radial limit almost everywhere. This is taken as the definition of Hf on T, so that T_{r}H f tends pointwise to H almost everywhere. The function Hf is of weak L^{1} type.

The inequality used above to prove pointwise convergence for L^{p} function with 1 < p < ∞ make sense for L^{1} functions by invoking the maximal function. The inequality becomes

$${|H_\varepsilon f - T_{1-\varepsilon}Hf|\le 4f^*.}$$

Let

$${\omega(f)=\limsup_{\varepsilon\to 0} |H_\varepsilon f - T_{1-\varepsilon}Hf|.}$$

If g is smooth, then the difference tends to zero everywhere, so ω(f − g) = ω(f). On the other hand, f can be approximated arbitrarily closely in L^{1} by smooth g. Then

$$m\{x: \, \omega(f)(x)> \lambda\} =m\{x: \, \omega(f-g)(x)> \lambda\} \le m\{x: \, 4(f-g)^*(x)> \lambda\} \le C\lambda^{-1}\|f-g\|_1.$$

The right hand side can be made arbitrarily small, so that ω(f) = 0 almost everywhere. Thus the difference for f tends to zero almost everywhere. A more refined argument can be given to show that, as in case of L^{p}, the difference tends to zero at all Lebesgue points of f. In combination with the result for the conjugate Poisson integral, it follows that, if f is in L^{1}(T), then H_{ε}f converges to Hf almost everywhere, a theorem originally proved by Privalov in 1919.

== General theory ==
Calderón & Zygmund (1952) introduced general techniques for studying singular integral operators of convolution type. In Fourier transform the operators are given by multiplication operators. These will yield bounded operators on L^{2} if the corresponding multiplier function is bounded. To prove boundedness on L^{p} spaces, Calderón and Zygmund introduced a method of decomposing L^{1} functions, generalising the rising sun lemma of F. Riesz. This method showed that the operator defined a continuous operator from L^{1} to the space of functions of weak L^{1}. The Marcinkiewicz interpolation theorem and duality then implies that the singular integral operator is bounded on all L^{p} for 1 < p < ∞. A simple version of this theory is described below for operators on R. As de Leeuw (1965) showed, results on R can be deduced from corresponding results for T by restricting the multiplier to the integers, or equivalently periodizing the kernel of the operator. Corresponding results for the circle were originally established by Marcinkiewicz in 1939. These results generalize to R^{n} and T^{n}. They provide an alternative method for showing that the Riesz transforms, the higher Riesz transforms and in particular the Beurling transform define bounded operators on L^{p} spaces.

=== Calderón-Zygmund decomposition ===
Let f be a non-negative integrable or continuous function on [a,b]. Let I = (a,b). For any open subinterval J of [a,b], let f_{J} denote the average of |f| over J. Let α be a positive constant greater than f_{I}. Divide I into two equal intervals (omitting the midpoint). One of these intervals must satisfy f_{J} < α since their sum is 2f_{I} so less than 2α. Otherwise the interval will satisfy α ≤ f_{J} < 2α. Discard such intervals and repeat the halving process with the remaining interval, discarding intervals using the same criterion. This can be continued indefinitely. The discarded intervals are disjoint and their union is an open set Ω. For points x in the complement, they lie in a nested set of intervals with lengths decreasing to 0 and on each of which the average of f is bounded by α. If f is continuous these averages tend to |f(x)|. If f is only integrable this is only true almost everywhere, for it is true at the Lebesgue points of f by the Lebesgue differentiation theorem. Thus f satisfies |f(x)| ≤ α almost everywhere on Ω^{c}, the complement of Ω. Let J_{n} be the set of discarded intervals and define the "good" function g by

$${g(x)= \chi_{J_n}(f)\,\,\, (x\in J_n), \,\,\,\,\,g(x) = f(x)\,\,\, (x\in \Omega^c).}$$

By construction |g(x)| ≤ 2α almost everywhere and
$${\|g\|_1 \le \|f\|_1.}$$

Combining these two inequalities gives
$${\|g\|_p^p \le (2\alpha)^{p-1}\|f\|_1.}$$

Define the "bad" function b by b = f − g. Thus b is 0 off Ω and equal to f minus its average on J_{n}. So the average of b on J_{n} is zero and
$${\|b\|_1 \le 2\|f\|_1.}$$

Moreover, since |b| ≥ α on Ω
$${m(\Omega)\le \alpha^{-1} \|f\|_1.}$$

The decomposition
$$\displaystyle{f(x) =g(x) + b(x)}$$

is called the Calderón–Zygmund decomposition.

=== Multiplier theorem ===
Let K(x) be a kernel defined on R\{0} such that

$$W(f)=\lim_{\varepsilon\to 0}\int_{|x|\ge \varepsilon} K(x)f(x)\,dx$$

exists as a tempered distribution for f a Schwartz function. Suppose that the Fourier transform of T is bounded, so that convolution by W defines a bounded operator T on L^{2}(R). Then if K satisfies Hörmander's condition

$$A=\sup_{y\ne 0} \int_{|x|\ge 2|y|}|K(x-y) - K(x)|\, dx <\infty,$$

then T defines a bounded operator on L^{p} for 1 < p < ∞ and a continuous operator from L^{1} into functions of weak type L^{1}.

In fact by the Marcinkiewicz interpolation argument and duality, it suffices to check that if f is smooth of compact support then

$$m\{x:\, |Tf(x)| \ge 2\lambda\} \le (2A+4\|T\|)\cdot \lambda^{-1} \|f\|_1.$$

Take a Calderón−Zygmund decomposition of f as above
$$f(x)=g(x)+b(x)$$
with intervals J_{n} and with α = λμ, where μ > 0. Then

$$m\{x:\, |Tf(x)| \ge 2\lambda\} \le m\{x:\, |Tg(x)| \ge \lambda\} + m\{x:\, |Tb(x)| \ge \lambda\}.$$

The term for g can be estimated using Chebychev's inequality:

$$m\{x:\, |Tg(x)| \ge 2\lambda\} \le \lambda^{-2} \|Tg\|_2^2 \le \lambda^{-2}\|T\|^2 \|g\|_2^2 \le 2\lambda^{-1}\mu \|T\|^2 \|f\|_1.$$

If J* is defined to be the interval with the same centre as J but twice the length, the term for b can be broken up into two parts:

$$m\{x:\, |Tb(x)| \ge \lambda\}\le m\{x:\, x\notin \cup J_n^*,\,\,\, |Tb(x)| \ge \lambda\} +m(\cup J_n^*).$$

The second term is easy to estimate:

$$m(\cup J_n^*)\le \sum m(J_n^*)=2\sum m(J_n) \le 2\lambda^{-1} \mu^{-1} \|f\|_1.$$

To estimate the first term note that

$$b=\sum b_n, \qquad b_n =(f - \mathbf{Av}_{J_n}(f))\chi_{J_n}.$$

Thus by Chebychev's inequality:

$$m\{x:\, x\notin \cup J_m^*,\,\,\, |Tb(x)| \ge \lambda\}\le \lambda^{-1}\int_{(\cup J_m^*)^c} |Tb(x)|\, dx \le \lambda^{-1} \sum_n\int_{( J_n^*)^c} |Tb_n(x)|\, dx.$$

By construction the integral of b_{n} over J_{n} is zero. Thus, if y_{n} is the midpoint of J_{n}, then by Hörmander's condition:

$$\int_{( J_n^*)^c} |Tb_n(x)|\, dx= \int_{( J_n^*)^c} \left|\int_{J_n} (K(x-y)-K(x-y_n))b_n(y)\, dy\right|\, dx \le \int_{J_n} |b_n(y)| \int_{( J_n^*)^c} |K(x-y)-K(x-y_n)|\, dxdy \le A\|b_n\|_1.$$

Hence
$$m \left \{x:\, x\notin \cup J_m^*, |Tb(x)| \ge \lambda \right \} \le \lambda^{-1} A \|b\|_1 \le 2 A\lambda^{-1}\|f\|_1.$$

Combining the three estimates gives

$$m\{x:\, |Tf(x)| \ge \lambda\} \le \left (2\mu\|T\|^2 +2\mu^{-1} + 2A \right )\lambda^{-1}\|f\|_1.$$

The constant is minimized by taking
$$\mu=\|T\|^{-1}.$$

The Markinciewicz interpolation argument extends the bounds to any L^{p} with 1 < p < 2 as follows. Given a > 0, write

$$f=f_a + f^a,$$

where f_{a} = f if |f| < a and 0 otherwise and f^{a} = f if |f| ≥ a and 0 otherwise. Then by Chebychev's inequality and the weak type L^{1} inequality above

$$m\{x:\, |Tf(x)| > a\} \le m \left \{x:\, |Tf_a(x)| > \tfrac{a}{2} \right \}+ m \left \{x:\, |Tf^a(x)| > \tfrac{a}{2} \right \}\le 4a^{-2}\|T\|^2 \|f_a\|_2^2 +C a^{-1}\|f^a\|_1.$$

Hence

$$\begin{align}
\|Tf\|_p^p &= p\int_0^\infty a^{p-1} m\{x:\, |Tf(x)|> a\} \, da \\
&\le p \int_0^\infty a^{p-1} \left ( 4a^{-2}\|T\|^2 \|f_a\|_2^2 +C a^{-1}\|f^a\|_1 \right ) da \\
&=4\|T\|^2 \iint_{|f(x)|<a} |f(x)|^2 a^{p-3}\,dx\, da + 2C\iint_{|f(x)|\ge a} |f(x)| a^{p-2}\,dx\, da \\
&\le \left (4\|T\|^2(2-p)^{-1} + C (p-1)^{-1} \right ) \int |f|^p \\
&=C_p \|f\|_p^p.
\end{align}$$

By duality

$$\|Tf\|_q \le C_p \|f\|_q.$$

Continuity of the norms can be shown by a more refined argument or follows from the Riesz–Thorin interpolation theorem.
