= Paul Koebe =

German mathematician (1882–1945)

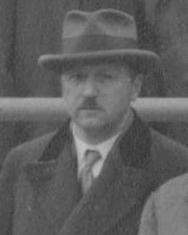
- Paul Koebe (1930)
- Born: 15 February 1882; Luckenwalde, German Empire
- Died: 6 August 1945 (aged 63); Leipzig, Germany
- Education: University of Berlin
- Known for: Koebe function Koebe 1/4 theorem Koebe–Andreev–Thurston theorem Planar Riemann surface Uniformization theorem
- Awards: Ackermann–Teubner Memorial Award (1922)
- Scientific career
- Fields: Mathematics
- Workplaces: University of Leipzig; University of Jena
- Academic advisors: Hermann Schwarz; Friedrich Schottky
- Notable students: Walter Brödel; Wei-Liang Chow; Georg Feigl; Herbert Grötzsch; Heinz Prüfer; Hans Richter; Hans Schubert; Jaroslav Tagamlitski

Paul Koebe (15 February 1882 – 6 August 1945) was a German mathematician. His work dealt primarily with complex analysis, his best known results being on the uniformization of Riemann surfaces.

== Biography ==
Paul Koebe was born 15 February 1882 in Luckenwalde to Otto Hermann Koebe (1852–1932), a successful firefighting equipment manufacturer, and Karoline Emma Krämer. After elementary school in Luckenwalde, he attended the Joachimsthal Gymnasium. He studied mathematics at Kiel University and Charlottenburg Technische Hochschule before completing his doctorate in mathematics at Berlin under Hermann Schwarz in 1904.

Koebe completed his habilitation and was subsequently a lecturer at Göttingen from 1907 to 1910. While there he obtained his famous results on the uniformization of Riemann surfaces in a series of papers, representing major progress on the Twenty Second of Hilbert's Problems.

Koebe was an extraordinary professor at Leipzig from 1910 to 1914, then an ordinary professor at the University of Jena before returning to Leipzig in 1926 as an ordinary professor.

Koebe's relationships with his colleagues were contentious. In one incident he publicly trivialized the results of Ludwig Bieberbach as simple corollaries to his own work. In another incident he stole and published results from the thesis of Richard Courant as his own. In a similar incident with L. E. J. Brouwer, Koebe supposedly went as far as to interfere with the printing of Brouwer's paper.

In November 1933, Koebe signed the Vow of Allegiance to Hitler and the Nazi party.

Koebe never married. He died from stomach cancer, 6 August 1945 in Leipzig, and is buried in Luckenwalde.

He conjectured the Koebe quarter theorem on the radii of disks in the images of injective functions, in 1907. His conjecture became a theorem when it was proven by Ludwig Bieberbach in 1916, and the function $f(z)=z/(1-z)^2$ providing a tight example for this theorem became known as the Koebe function.

Koebe was a member of several German scientific societies including Göttingen, Leipzig, and Heidelberg, as well as the Royal Prussian Academy of Sciences and the Finnish Academy of Science and Letters. Koebe received several mathematical prizes for his work on uniformization: In 1910, he was awarded the Berlin Academy prize; in 1922, the Ackermann–Teubner Memorial Award; and in 1927, Koebe received the international mathematics prize of the King of Sweden.

== Publications ==
- Koebe, Paul (1906). "Über die konforme Abbildung mehrfach zusammenhängender ebener Bereiche, insbesondere solcher Bereiche, deren Begrenzung durch Kreise gebildet wird". Jahresbericht DMV.
- Koebe, Paul (1907a). "Über die Uniformisierung reeller analytischer Kurven" [On the uniformization of Real algebraic curves]. Göttinger Nachrichten (in German): 177–190. JFM 38.0453.01.
- Koebe, Paul (1907b), "Über die Uniformisierung beliebiger analytischer Kurven" [On the uniformization of arbitrary analytical curves], Göttinger Nachrichten (in German): 191–210, JFM 38.0454.01
- Koebe, Paul (1907c). "Über die Uniformisierung beliebiger analytischer Kurven (Zweite Mitteilung)" [On the uniformization of arbitrary analytical curves]. Göttinger Nachrichten (in German): 633–669. JFM 38.0455.02.
- Koebe, Paul (1910a). "Über die Uniformisierung beliebiger analytischer Kurven" [On the uniformization of arbitrary analytical curves]. Journal für die Reine und Angewandte Mathematik (in German). 138: 192–253. doi:10.1515/crll.1910.138.192. S2CID 120198686.
- Koebe, Paul (1910b). "Über die Hilbertsche Uniformlsierungsmethode" (PDF). Göttinger Nachrichten: 61–65.
- Koebe, Paul (1910c). "Über die konforme Abbildung mehrfach zusammenhängender Bereiche". Jahresbericht DMV.

== See also ==
- Koebe groups
- Midsphere
- Riemann mapping theorem
