= Differential forms on a Riemann surface =

Conformal structure admits a Hodge dual of 1-forms without even specifying a metric

In mathematics, differential forms on a Riemann surface are an important special case of the general theory of differential forms on smooth manifolds, distinguished by the fact that the conformal structure on the Riemann surface intrinsically defines a Hodge star operator on 1-forms (or differentials) without specifying a Riemannian metric. This allows the use of Hilbert space techniques for studying function theory on the Riemann surface and in particular for the construction of harmonic and holomorphic differentials with prescribed singularities. These methods were first used by Hilbert (1909) in his variational approach to the Dirichlet principle, making rigorous the arguments proposed by Riemann. Later Weyl (1940) found a direct approach using his method of orthogonal projection, a precursor of the modern theory of elliptic differential operators and Sobolev spaces. These techniques were originally applied to prove the uniformization theorem and its generalization to planar Riemann surfaces. Later they supplied the analytic foundations for the harmonic integrals of Hodge (1941). This article covers general results on differential forms on a Riemann surface that do not rely on any choice of Riemannian structure.

== Hodge star on 1-forms ==
On a Riemann surface the Hodge star is defined on 1-forms by the local formula

$$\displaystyle{ \star(p\,dx + q\, dy) =  -q\,dx + p\, dy.}$$

It is well-defined because it is invariant under holomorphic changes of coordinate.

Indeed, if z = x + iy is holomorphic as a function of w = u + iv, then by the Cauchy–Riemann equations x_{u} = y_{v} and y_{u} = −x_{v}. In the new coordinates

$$\displaystyle{p\,dx + q\, dy = (px_u + q y_u)du + (px_v+qy_v)dv=p_1 du + q_1 dv,}$$

so that

$$-q_1 \,du + p_1 \,dv= -(px_v+qy_v)du + (px_u + q y_u)dv = -q(x_u du + x_v dv) + p(y_u du + y_vdv) = -q\,dx + p\, dy,$$

proving the claimed invariance.

Note that for 1-forms ω_{1} = p_{1} dx + q_{1} dy and ω_{2} = p_{2} dx + q_{2} dy

$$\displaystyle{\omega_1 \wedge \star \omega_2 = (p_1p_2 + q_1q_2)\, dx\wedge dy =  \omega_2 \wedge \star \omega_1.}$$

In particular if ω = p dx + q dy then

$$\displaystyle{\omega \wedge \star \omega =(p^2+q^2) \, dx\wedge dy.}$$

Note that in standard coordinates

$$\star dz = -i dz,\,\, \star d\overline{z} = i d\overline{z}.$$

Recall also that

$${\partial\over \partial z} = {1\over 2}\left({\partial \over \partial x} - i {\partial \over \partial y}\right),\,\,\, {\partial \over\partial \overline{z}} =
{1\over 2} \left({\partial \over\partial x} +i {\partial \over\partial y}\right),$$

so that

$$df= f_z \, dz + f_{\overline{z}}\, d\overline{z} = \partial f + \bar{\partial}f.$$

The decomposition $d = \partial + \bar{\partial}$ is independent of the choice of local coordinate. The 1-forms with only a $dz$ component are called (1,0) forms; those with only a $d\overline{z}$ component are called (0,1) forms. The operators $\partial$ and $\overline{\partial}$ are called the Dolbeault operators.

It follows that

$$\star df=  -i\partial f + i\bar{\partial}f.$$

The Dolbeault operators can similarly be defined on 1-forms and as zero on 2-forms. They have the properties

$$d=\partial+\bar{\partial}$$
$$\partial^2=\bar{\partial}^2=\partial\bar{\partial}+\bar{\partial}\partial=0.$$

== Poincaré lemma ==
On a Riemann surface the Poincaré lemma states that every closed 1-form or 2-form is locally exact. Thus if ω is a smooth 1-form with dω = 0 then in some open neighbourhood of a given point there is a smooth function f such that ω = df in that neighbourhood; and for any smooth 2-form Ω there is a smooth 1-form ω defined in some open neighbourhood of a given point such that Ω = dω in that neighbourhood.

If ω = p dx + q dy is a closed 1-form on (a,b) × (c,d), then p_{y} = q_{x}. If ω = df then p = f_{x} and q = f_{y}. Set

$$\displaystyle{g(x,y)=\int_a^x p(t,y)\, dt,}$$

so that g_{x} = p. Then h = f − g must satisfy h_{x} = 0 and h_{y} = q − g_{y}. The right hand side here is independent of x since its partial derivative with respect to x is 0. So

$$\displaystyle{h(x,y)=\int_c^y q(a,s)\, ds - g(a,y)=\int_c^y q(a,s)\, ds,}$$

and hence

$$\displaystyle{f(x,y)=\int_a^x p(t,y)\, dt + \int_c^y q(a,s)\, ds.}$$

Similarly, if Ω = r dx ∧ dy then Ω = d(f dx + g dy) with g_{x} − f_{y} = r. Thus a solution is given by f = 0 and

$$\displaystyle{g(x,y)=\int_a^x r(t,y) \, dt.}$$

Comment on differential forms with compact support. Note that if ω has compact support, so vanishes outside some smaller rectangle (a_{1},b_{1}) × (c_{1},d_{1}) with a < a_{1} < b_{1} <b and c < c_{1} < d_{1} < d, then the same is true for the solution f(x,y). So the Poincaré lemma for 1-forms holds with this additional conditions of compact support.

A similar statement is true for 2-forms; but, since there is some choices for the solution, a little more care has to be taken in making those choices.

In fact if Ω has compact support on (a,b) × (c,d) and if furthermore ∬ Ω = 0, then Ω = dω with ω a 1-form of compact support on (a,b) × (c,d). Indeed, Ω must have support in some smaller rectangle (a_{1},b_{1}) × (c_{1},d_{1}) with a < a_{1} < b_{1} <b and c < c_{1} < d_{1} < d. So r(x, y) vanishes for x ≤ a_{1} or x ≥ b_{1} and for y ≤ c_{1} or y ≥ d_{1}. Let h(y) be a smooth function supported in (c_{1},d_{1}) with ∫^{d}_{c} h(t) dt = 1. Set k(x) = ∫^{d}_{c} r(x,y) dy: it is a smooth function supported in (a_{1},b_{1}). Hence R(x,y) = r(x,y) − k(x)h(y) is smooth and supported in (a_{1},b_{1}) × (c_{1},d_{1}). It now satisfies ∫^{d}_{c} R(x,y) dy ≡ 0. Finally set

$$P(x,y)=\int_c^y R(x,y) dy,\,\,\, Q(x,y)=h(y)\int_a^x k(s) \, ds.$$

Both P and Q are smooth and supported in (a_{1},b_{1}) × (c_{1},d_{1}) with P_{y} = R and Q_{x}(x,y) = k(x)h(y). Hence ω = −P dx + Q dy is a smooth 1-form supported in (a_{1},b_{1}) × (c_{1},d_{1}) with

$$d\omega = (Q_x + P_y)\,dx \wedge dy = r \,dx \wedge dy =\Omega.$$

== Integration of 2-forms ==
If Ω is a continuous 2-form of compact support on a Riemann surface X, its support K can be covered by finitely many coordinate charts U_{i} and there is a partition of unity χ_{i} of smooth non-negative functions with compact support such that Σ χ_{i} = 1 on a neighbourhood of K. Then the integral of Ω is defined by

$$\displaystyle{\int_X \Omega = \sum \int_{X} \chi_i\Omega= \sum \int_{U_i} \chi_i \Omega,}$$

where the integral over U_{i} has its usual definition in local coordinates. The integral is independent of the choices here.

If Ω has the local representation f(x,y) dx ∧ dy, then |Ω| is the density |f(x,y)| dx ∧ dy, which is well defined and satisfies |∫_{X} Ω| ≤ ∫_{X} |Ω|. If Ω is a non-negative continuous density, not necessarily of compact support, its integral is defined by

$$\displaystyle{\int_X \Omega =\sup_{0\le \psi \le 1,\, \psi\in C_c(X)} \int_X \psi \Omega.}$$

If Ω is any continuous 2-form it is integrable if ∫_{X} |Ω| < ∞. In this case, if ∫_{X} |Ω| = lim ∫_{X} ψ_{n} |Ω|, then ∫_{X} Ω can be defined as lim ∫_{X} ψ_{n} Ω. The integrable continuous 2-forms form a complex normed space with norm ||Ω||_{1} = ∫_{X} |Ω|.

== Integration of 1-forms along paths ==
If ω is a 1-form on a Riemann surface X and γ(t) for a ≤ t ≤ b is a smooth path in X, then the mapping γ induces a 1-form γ∗ω on [a,b]. The integral of ω along γ is defined by

$$\displaystyle{\int_\gamma \omega = \int_a^b \gamma^{*} \omega.}$$

This definition extends to piecewise smooth paths γ by dividing the path up into the finitely many segments on which it is smooth. In local coordinates if ω = p dx + q dy and γ(t) = (x(t),y(t)) then

$$\displaystyle{\gamma^* \omega= p(\gamma(t)) \dot{x}(t) \, dt + q(\gamma(t))\dot{y}(t)\, dt,}$$

so that

$$\displaystyle{\int_\gamma \omega= \int_a^b p(\gamma(t)) \dot{x}(t) \, dt + q(\gamma(t))\dot{y}(t)\, dt.}$$

Note that if the 1-form ω is exact on some connected open set U, so that ω = df for some smooth function f on U (unique up to a constant), and γ(t), a ≤ t ≤ b, is a smooth path in U, then

$$\displaystyle{\int_\gamma \omega =\int_a^b d(f(\gamma(t)) = f(\gamma(b)) - f(\gamma(a)).}$$

This depends only on the difference of the values of f at the endpoints of the curve, so is independent of the choice of f. By the Poincaré lemma, every closed 1-form is locally exact, so this allows ∫_{γ} ω to be computed as a sum of differences of this kind and for the integral of closed 1-forms to be extended to continuous paths:

Monodromy theorem. If ω is a closed 1-form, the integral ∫_{γ} ω can be extended to any continuous path γ(t), a ≤ t ≤ b so that it is invariant under any homotopy of paths keeping the end points fixed.

In fact, the image of γ is compact, so can be covered by finitely many connected open sets U_{i} on each of which ω can be written df_{i} for some smooth function f_{i} on U_{i}, unique up to a constant. It may be assumed that [a,b] is broken up into finitely many closed intervals K_{i} = [t_{i−1},t_{i}] with t_{0} = a and t_{n} = b so that γ(K_{i}) ⊂ U_{i}. From the above if γ is piecewise smooth,

$$\displaystyle{\int_\gamma \omega = \sum \int_{\gamma|_{K_i}} \omega= \sum \int_{K_i} d(f_i\circ \gamma) =\sum_{i=1}^n f_i(\gamma(t_i)) - f_i(\gamma(t_{i-1}))=
f_n(\gamma(b)) - f_1(\gamma(b)) + \sum_{i=1}^{n-1} [f_i(\gamma(t_i)) - f_{i+1}(\gamma(t_i))].}$$

Now γ(t_{i}) lies in the open set U_{i} ∩ U_{i+1}, hence in a connected open component V_{i}. The difference g_{i} = f_{i} − f_{i−1} satisfies dg_{i} = 0, so is a constant c_{i} independent of γ. Hence

$$\displaystyle{\int_\gamma \omega = f_n(\gamma(b)) - f_1(\gamma(a)) + \sum_{i=1}^{n-1} c_i.}$$

The formula on the right hand side also makes sense if γ is just continuous on [a,b] and can be used to define ∫_{γ} ω. The definition is independent of choices: for the curve γ can be uniformly approximated by piecewise smooth curves δ so close that δ(K_{i}) ⊂ U_{i} for all i; the formula above then equals ∫_{δ} ω and shows the integral is independent of the choice of δ. The same argument shows that the definition is also invariant under small homotopies fixing endpoints; by compactness, it is therefore invariant under any homotopy fixing endpoints.

The same argument shows that a homotopy between closed continuous loops does not change their integrals over closed 1-forms. Since ∫_{γ} df = f(γ(b)) − f(γ(a)), the integral of an exact form over a closed loop vanishes. Conversely if the integral of a closed 1-form ω over any closed loop vanishes, then the 1-form must be exact.

Indeed a function f(z) can be defined on X by fixing a point w, taking any path δ from w to z and setting f(z) = ∫_{δ} ω. The assumption implies that f is independent of the path. To check that df = ω, it suffices to check this locally. Fix z_{0} and take a path δ_{1} from w to z_{0}. Near z_{0} the Poincaré lemma implies that ω = dg for some smooth function g defined in a neighbourhood of z_{0}. If δ_{2} is a path from z_{0} to z, then f(z) = ∫_{δ_{1}} ω + ∫_{δ_{2}} ω = ∫_{δ_{1}} ω + g(z) − g(z_{0}), so f differs from g by a constant near z_{0}. Hence df = dg = ω near z_{0}.

A closed 1-form is exact if and only if its integral around any piecewise smooth or continuous Jordan curve vanishes.

In fact the integral is already known to vanish for an exact form, so it suffices to show that if ∫_{_{γ}} ω = 0 for all piecewise smooth closed Jordan curves γ then ∫_{_{γ}} ω = 0 for all closed continuous curves γ. Let γ be a closed continuous curve. The image of γ can be covered by finitely many opens on which ω is exact and this data can be used to define the integral on γ. Now recursively replace γ by smooth segments between successive division points on the curve so that the resulting curve δ has only finitely many intersection points and passes through each of these only twice. This curve can be broken up as a superposition of finitely many piecewise smooth Jordan curves. The integral over each of these is zero, so their sum, the integral over δ, is also zero. By construction the integral over δ equals the integral over γ, which therefore vanishes.

The above argument also shows that given a continuous Jordan curve γ(t), there is a finite set of simple smooth Jordan curves γ_{i}(t) with nowhere zero derivatives such that

$$\int_\gamma \omega = \sum_i \int_{\gamma_i} \omega$$

for any closed 1-form ω. Thus to check exactness of a closed form it suffices to show that the vanishing of the integral around any regular closed curve, i.e. a simple smooth Jordan curve with nowhere vanishing derivative.

The same methods show that any continuous loop on a Riemann surface is homotopic to a smooth loop with nowhere zero derivative.

== Green–Stokes formula ==
If U is a bounded region in the complex plane with boundary consisting of piecewise smooth curves and ω is a 1-form defined on a neighbourhood of the closure of U, then the Green–Stokes formula states that

$$\int_{\partial U} \omega = \int_U d\omega .$$

In particular if ω is a 1-form of compact support on C then

$$\int_{\bf C} d\omega = 0 ,$$

since the formula may be applied to a large disk containing the support of ω.

Similar formulas hold on a Riemann surface X and can be deduced from the classical formulas using partitions of unity. Thus if U ⊂ X is a connected region with compact closure and piecewise smooth boundary ∂U and ω is a 1-form defined on a neighbourhood of the closure of U, then the Green–Stokes formula states that

$$\displaystyle{\int_{\partial U} \omega = \int_U d\omega.}$$

Moreover, if ω is a 1-form of compact support on X then

$$\int_{X} d\omega = 0 .$$

To prove the second formula take a partition of unity ψ_{i} supported in coordinate charts covering the support of ω. Then ∫_{X} dω = Σ ∫_{X} d(ψ_{i} ω) = 0, by the planar result. Similarly to prove the first formula it suffices to show that

$$\displaystyle{\int_{\partial U} \psi\omega = \int_U d(\psi\omega)}$$

when ψ is a smooth function compactly supported in some coordinate patch. If the coordinate patch avoids the boundary curves, both sides vanish by the second formula above. Otherwise it can be assumed that the coordinate patch is a disk, the boundary of which cuts the curve transversely at two points. The same will be true for a slightly smaller disk containing the support of ψ. Completing the curve to a Jordan curve by adding part of the boundary of the smaller disk, the formula reduces to the planar Green-Stokes formula.

The Green–Stokes formula implies an adjoint relation for the Laplacian on functions defined as Δf = −d∗df. This gives a 2-form, given in local coordinates by the formula

$$\Delta f =\left( -{\partial^2 f \over \partial x^2} - {\partial^2 f \over \partial y^2}\right) \, dx \wedge dy .$$

Then if f and g are smooth and the closure of U is compact

$$\int_U f\Delta g - g \Delta f = \int_{\partial U} g {\star d f} - f{\star d g} .$$

Moreover, if f or g has compact support then

$$\int_X f \Delta g = \int_X g \Delta f .$$

== Duality between 1-forms and closed curves ==
Theorem. If γ is a continuous Jordan curve on a Riemann surface X, there is a smooth closed 1-form α of compact support such that ∫_{γ} ω = ∫_{X} ω ∧ α for any closed smooth 1-form ω on X.

It suffices to prove this when γ is a regular closed curve. By the inverse function theorem, there is a tubular neighbourhood of the image of γ, i.e. a smooth diffeomorphism Γ(t, s) of the annulus S^{1} × (−1, 1) into X such that Γ(t, 0) = γ(t). Using a bump function on the second factor, a non-negative function g with compact support can be constructed such that g is smooth off γ, has support in a small neighbourhood of γ, and in a sufficiently small neighbourhood of γ is equal to 0 for s < 0 and 1 for s ≥ 0. Thus g has a jump discontinuity across γ, although its differential dg is smooth with compact support. But then, setting α = −dg, it follows from Green's formula applied to the annulus γ × [0, ε] that

$$\int_X \omega \wedge \alpha = \int_X dg \wedge \omega =  \int_{\gamma\times (0,\varepsilon)} dg \wedge \omega = \int_{\gamma\times (0,\varepsilon)}d(g\omega) = \int_\gamma \omega.$$

Corollary 1. A closed smooth 1-form ω is exact if and only if ∫_{X} ω ∧ α = 0 for all smooth 1-forms α of compact support.

In fact if ω is exact, it has the form df for f smooth, so that ∫_{X} ω ∧ α = ∫_{X} df ∧ α = ∫_{X} d(f α) = 0 by Green's theorem. Conversely, if ∫_{X} ω ∧ α = 0 for all smooth 1-forms α of compact support, the duality between Jordan curves and 1-forms implies that the integral of ω around any closed Jordan curve is zero and hence that ω is exact.

Corollary 2. If γ is a continuous closed curve on a Riemann surface X, there is a smooth closed 1-form α of compact support such that ∫_{γ} ω = ∫_{X} ω ∧ α for any closed smooth 1-form ω on X. The form α is unique up to adding an exact form and can be taken to have support in any open neighbourhood of the image of γ.

In fact γ is homotopic to a piecewise smooth closed curve δ, so that ∫_{γ} ω = ∫_{δ} ω. On the other hand there are finitely many piecewise smooth Jordan curves δ_{i} such that ∫_{δ} ω = Σ ∫_{δ_{i}} ω. The result for δ_{i} thus implies the result for γ. If β is another form with the same property, the difference α − β satisfies ∫_{X} ω ∧ (α − β) = 0 for all closed smooth 1-forms ω. So the difference is exact by Corollary 1. Finally, if U is any neighbourhood of the image of γ, then the last result follows by applying first assertion to γ and U in place of γ and X.

== Intersection number of closed curves ==
The intersection number of two closed curves γ_{1}, γ_{2} in a Riemann surface X can be defined analytically by the formula

$$I(\gamma_1 , \gamma_2) = \int_X \alpha_1 \wedge \alpha_2,$$

where α_{1} and α_{2} are smooth 1-forms of compact support corresponding to γ_{1} and γ_{2}. From the definition it follows that I(γ_{1}, γ_{2}) = −I(γ_{2}, γ_{1}). Since α_{i} can be taken to have its support in a neighbourhood of the image of γ_{i}, it follows that I(γ_{1} , γ_{2}) = 0 if γ_{1} and γ_{2} are disjoint. By definition it depends only on the homotopy classes of γ_{1} and γ_{2}.

More generally the intersection number is always an integer and counts the number of times with signs that the two curves intersect. A crossing at a point is a positive or negative crossing according to whether dγ_{1} ∧ dγ_{2} has the same or opposite sign to dx ∧ dy = −i/2 dz ∧ dz̅, for a local holomorphic parameter z = x + iy.

Indeed, by homotopy invariance, it suffices to check this for smooth Jordan curves with nowhere vanishing derivatives. The α_{1} can be defined by taking α_{1}df with f of compact support in a neighbourhood of the image of γ_{1} equal to 0 near the left hand side of γ_{1}, 1 near the right hand side of γ_{1} and smooth off the image of γ_{1}. Then if the points of intersection of γ_{2}(t) with γ_{1} occur at t = t_{1}, ..., t_{m}, then

$$I(\gamma_1,\gamma_2) = \int_{\gamma_2} \alpha_1 = \int_{\gamma_2} df = \sum f\circ \gamma_2(t_i+) - f\circ\gamma_2(t_i-).$$

This gives the required result since the jump f∘γ_{2}(t_{i}+) − f∘γ_{2}(t_{i}−) is + 1 for a positive crossing and −1 for a negative crossing.

== Holomorphic and harmonic 1-forms ==
A holomorphic 1-form ω is one that in local coordinates is given by an expression f(z) dz with f holomorphic. Since $dg=\partial_z g \, dz + \partial_{\overline{z}} g\, d\overline{z},$ it follows that dω = 0, so any holomorphic 1-form is closed. Moreover, since ∗dz = −i dz, ω must satisfy ∗ω = −iω. These two conditions characterize holomorphic 1-forms. For if ω is closed, locally it can be written as dg for some g, The condition ∗dg = i dg forces $\partial_{\overline{z}} g = 0$, so that g is holomorphic and dg = g '(z) dz, so that ω is holomorphic.

Let ω = f dz be a holomorphic 1-form. Write ω = ω_{1} + iω_{2} with ω_{1} and ω_{2} real. Then dω_{1} = 0 and dω_{2} = 0; and since ∗ω = −iω, ∗ω_{1} = ω_{2}. Hence d∗ω_{1} = 0. This process can clearly be reversed, so that there is a one-one correspondence between holomorphic 1-forms and real 1-forms ω_{1} satisfying dω_{1} = 0 and d∗ω_{1} = 0. Under this correspondence, ω_{1} is the real part of ω while ω is given by ω = ω_{1} + i∗ω_{1}. Such forms ω_{1} are called harmonic 1-forms. By definition ω_{1} is harmonic if and only if ∗ω_{1} is harmonic.

Since holomorphic 1-forms locally have the form df with f a holomorphic function and since the real part of a holomorphic function is harmonic, harmonic 1-forms locally have the form dh with h a harmonic function. Conversely if ω_{1} can be written in this way locally, d∗ω_{1} = d∗dh = (h_{xx} + h_{yy}) dx∧dy so that h is harmonic.

Remark. The definition of harmonic functions and 1-forms is intrinsic and only relies on the underlying Riemann surface structure. If, however, a conformal metric is chosen on the Riemann surface, the adjoint d* of d can be defined and the Hodge star operation extended to functions and 2-forms. The Hodge Laplacian can be defined on k-forms as ∆_{k} = dd* +d*d and then a function f or a 1-form ω is harmonic if and only if it is annihilated by the Hodge Laplacian, i.e. ∆_{0}f = 0 or ∆_{1}ω = 0. The metric structure, however, is not required for the application to the uniformization of simply connected or planar Riemann surfaces.

== Sobolev spaces on T^{2} ==
The theory of Sobolev spaces on T^{2} can be found in Bers, John & Schechter (1979), an account which is followed in several later textbooks such as Warner (1983) and Griffiths & Harris (1994). It provides an analytic framework for studying function theory on the torus C/Z+i Z = R^{2} / Z^{2} using Fourier series, which are just eigenfunction expansions for the Laplacian –∂^{2}/∂x^{2} –∂^{2}/∂y^{2}. The theory developed here essentially covers tori C / Λ where Λ is a lattice in C. Although there is a corresponding theory of Sobolev spaces on any compact Riemann surface, it is elementary in this case, because it reduces to harmonic analysis on the compact Abelian group T^{2}. Classical approaches to Weyl's lemma use harmonic analysis on the non-compact Abelian group C = R^{2}, i.e. the methods of Fourier analysis, in particular convolution operators and the fundamental solution of the Laplacian.

Let T^{2} = {(e^{ix},e^{iy}: x, y ∊ [0,2π)} = R^{2}/Z^{2} = C/Λ where Λ = Z + i Z. For λ = m + i n ≅ (m,n) in Λ, set e_{λ} (x,y) = e^{i(mx + ny)}. Furthermore, set D_{x} = −i∂/∂x and D_{y} = −i∂/∂y. For α = (p,q) set D^{α} =(D_{x})^{p} (D_{y})^{q}, a differential operator of total degree |α| = p + q. Thus D^{α}e_{λ} = λ^{α} e_{λ}, where λ^{α} =m^{p}n^{q}. The (e_{λ}) form an orthonormal basis in C(T^{2}) for the inner product (f,g) = (2π)^{−2}∬ f(x,y) g̅(x̅,y̅) dx dy, so that (Σ a_{λ} e_{λ}, Σ b_{μ} e_{μ}) = Σ a_{λ}b̅_{λ̅}.

For f in C^{∞}(T'^{2}) and k an integer, define the kth Sobolev norm by

$$\|f\|_{(k)} = \left(\sum |\widehat{f}(\lambda)|^2 (1 + |\lambda|^2)^k\right)^{1/2}.$$

The associated inner product

$$\displaystyle{(f,g)_{(k)} = \sum \widehat{f}(\lambda)\overline{\widehat{g}(\lambda)} (1 +|\lambda|^2)^k}$$

makes C^{∞}(T^{2}) into an inner product space. Let H_{k}(T^{2}) be its Hilbert space completion. It can be described equivalently as the Hilbert space completion of the space of trigonometric polynomials—that is finite sums (Σ a_{λ} e_{λ}—with respect to the kth Sobolev norm, so that H_{k}(T^{2}) = {Σ a_{λ} e_{λ} : Σ |a_{λ}|^{2}(1 + |λ|^{2})^{k} < ∞} with inner product

(Σ a_{λ} e_{λ}, Σ b_{μ} e_{μ})_{(k)} = Σ a_{λ}b̅_{λ̅} (1 + |λ|^{2})^{k}.

As explained below, the elements in the intersection H_{∞}(T^{2}) = $\cap$ H_{k}(T^{2}) are exactly the smooth functions on T^{2}; elements in the union H_{−∞}(T^{2}) = $\cup$ H_{k}(T^{2}) are just distributions on T^{2} (sometimes referred to as "periodic distributions" on R^{2}).

The following is a (non-exhaustive) list of properties of the Sobolev spaces.

- Differentiability and Sobolev spaces. C^{k}(T^{2}) ⊂ H_{k}(T^{2}) for k ≥ 0 since, using the binomial theorem to expand (1 + |λ|^{2})^{k},

$$\displaystyle{\|f\|_{(k)}^2 = \sum_{|\alpha|\le k} {k\choose \alpha} \|D^\alpha f\|^2  \le C \cdot \sup_{|\alpha|\le k} |D^\alpha f|^2.}$$

- Differential operators. D^{α} H_{k}(T^{2}) ⊂ H_{k−|α|}(T^{2}) and D^{α} defines a bounded linear map from H_{k}(T^{2}) to H_{k−|α|}(T^{2}). The operator I + Δ defines a unitary map of H_{k+2}(T^{2}) onto H_{k}(T^{2}); in particular (I + Δ)^{k} defines a unitary map of H_{k}(T^{2}) onto H_{−k}(T^{2}) for k ≥ 0.

The first assertions follow because D^{α} e_{λ} = λ^{α} e_{λ} and |λ^{α}| ≤ |λ|^{|α|} ≤ (1 + |λ|^{2})^{|α|/2}. The second assertions follow because I + Δ acts as multiplication by 1 + |λ|^{2} on e_{λ}.

- Duality. For k ≥ 0, the pairing sending f, g to (f,g) establishes a duality between H_{k}(T^{2}) and H_{−k}(T^{2}).

This is a restatement of the fact that (I + Δ)^{k} establishes a unitary map between these two spaces, because (f,g) = ((I + Δ)^{k}f,g)_{(−k)}.

- Multiplication operators. If h is a smooth function then multiplication by h defines a continuous operator on H_{k}(T^{2}).

For k ≥ 0, this follows from the formula for ||f||^{2}_{(k)} above and the Leibniz rule. Continuity for H_{−k}(T^{2}) follows by duality, since (f,hg) = (h̅f,g).

- Sobolev spaces and differentiability (Sobolev's embedding theorem). For k ≥ 0, H_{k+2}(T^{2}) ⊂ C^{k}(T^{2}) and sup_{|α|≤k} |D^{α}f| ≤ C_{k} ⋅ ||f||_{(k+2)}.

The inequalities for trigonometric polynomials imply the containments. The inequality for k = 0 follows from

$$\sup \left|\sum a_\lambda e_\lambda\right| \le \left(\sum (1+|\lambda|^2)^{-2}\right)^{1/2} \cdot \sum |a_\lambda| \le \left(\sum |a_\lambda|^2 (1+|\lambda|^2)^2\right)^{1/2}
= \left(\sum (1+|\lambda|^2)^{-2}\right)^{1/2} \cdot \left\|\sum a_\lambda e_\lambda \right\|_{(2)},$$

by the Cauchy–Schwarz inequality. The first term is finite by the integral test, since ∬_{C} (1 + |z|^{2})^{−2} dx dy = 2π ∫^{∞}_{0} (1 + r^{2})^{−2} r dr < ∞ using polar coordinates. In general if |α| ≤ k, then |sup D^{α}f| ≤ C_{0} ||D^{α}f||_{2} ≤ C_{0} ⋅ C_{α} ⋅ ||f||_{k+2} by the continuity properties of D^{α}.

- Smooth functions. C^{∞}(T^{2}) = $\cap$ H_{k}(T^{2}) consists of Fourier series Σ a_{λ} e_{λ} such that for all k > 0, (1 + |λ|^{2})^{k} |a_{λ}| tends to 0 as |λ| tends to ∞, i.e. the Fourier coefficients a_{λ} are of "rapid decay".

This is an immediate consequence of the Sobolev embedding theorem.

- Inclusion maps (Rellich's compactness theorem). If k > j, the space H_{k}(T^{2}) is a subspace of H_{j}(T^{2}) and the inclusion H_{k}(T^{2}) $\rightarrow$ H_{j}(T^{2}) is compact.

With respect to the natural orthonormal bases, the inclusion map becomes multiplication by (1 + |λ|^{2})^{−(k−j)/2}. It is therefore compact because it is given by a diagonal matrix with diagonal entries tending to zero.

- Elliptic regularity (Weyl's lemma). Suppose that f and u in H_{−∞}(T^{2}) = $\cup$ H_{k}(T^{2}) satisfy ∆u = f. Suppose also that ψ f is a smooth function for every smooth function ψ vanishing off a fixed open set U in T^{2}; then the same is true for u. (Thus if f is smooth off U, so is u.)

By the Leibniz rule Δ(ψu) = (Δψ) u + 2(ψ_{x}u_{x} + ψ_{y}u_{y}) + ψ Δu, so ψu = (I + Δ)^{−1}[ψu + (Δψ) u + 2(ψ_{x}u_{x} + ψ_{y}u_{y}) + ψf]. If it is known that φu lies in H_{k}(T^{2}) for some k and all φ vanishing off U, then differentiating shows that φu_{x} and φu_{y} lie in H_{k−1}(T^{2}). The square-bracketed expression therefore also lies in H_{k−1}(T^{2}). The operator (I + Δ)^{−1} carries this space onto H_{k+1}(T^{2}), so that ψu must lie in H_{k+1}(T^{2}). Continuing in this way, it follows that ψu lies in $\cap$ H_{k}(T^{2}) = C^{∞}(T^{2}).

- Hodge decomposition on functions. H_{0}(T^{2}) = ∆ H_{2}(T^{2}) $\oplus$ ker ∆ and C^{∞}(T^{2}) = ∆ C^{∞}(T^{2}) $\oplus$ ker ∆.

Identifying H_{2}(T^{2}) with L^{2}(T^{2}) = H_{0}(T^{2}) using the unitary operator I + Δ, the first statement reduces to proving that the operator T = ∆(I + Δ)^{−1} satisfies L^{2}(T^{2}) = im T $\oplus$ ker T. This operator is bounded, self-adjoint and diagonalized by the orthonormal basis e_{λ} with eigenvalue |λ|^{2}(1 + |λ|^{2})^{−1}. The operator T has kernel C e_{0} (the constant functions) and on (ker T)^{⊥} = i̅m̅ T̅ it has a bounded inverse given by S e_{λ} = |λ|^{−2}(1 + |λ|^{2}) e_{λ} for λ ≠ 0. So im T must be closed and hence L^{2}(T^{2}) = (ker T)^{⊥} $\oplus$ ker T = im T $\oplus$ ker T. Finally if f = ∆g + h with f in C^{∞}(T^{2}), g in H_{2}(T^{2}) and h constant, g must be smooth by Weyl's lemma.

- Hodge theory on T^{2}. Let Ω^{k}(T^{2}) be the space of smooth k-forms for 0 ≤ k ≤ 2. Thus Ω^{0}(T^{2}) = C^{∞}(T^{2}), Ω^{1}(T^{2}) = C^{∞}(T^{2}) dx $\oplus$ C^{∞}(T^{2}) dy and Ω^{2}(T^{2}) = C^{∞}(T^{2}) dx ∧ dy. The Hodge star operation is defined on 1-forms by ∗(p dx + q dy) = −q dx + p dy. This definition is extended to 0-forms and 2-forms by *f = f dx ∧ dy and *(g dx ∧ dy) = g. Thus ** = (−1)^{k} on k-forms. There is a natural complex inner product on Ω^{k}(T^{2}) defined by

$$\displaystyle{(\alpha,\beta) = \int_{{\mathbf T}^2} \alpha \wedge \star \overline{\beta}.}$$

Define δ = −∗d∗. Thus δ takes Ω^{k}(T^{2}) to Ω^{k−1}(T^{2}), annihilating functions; it is the adjoint of d for the above inner products, so that δ = d*. Indeed by the Green-Stokes formula

$$\displaystyle{(d\alpha,\beta) = \int d\alpha \wedge \star \overline{\beta} = \int d\alpha \wedge \star \overline{\beta} -\int d(\alpha\wedge \star\overline{\beta}) = (-1)^{\partial\alpha} \int \alpha\wedge d\star\overline{\beta} = \int\alpha \wedge \star\overline{\delta\beta} = (\alpha,\delta\beta).}$$

The operators d and δ = d* satisfy d^{2} = 0 and δ^{2} = 0. The Hodge Laplacian on k-forms is defined by ∆_{k} = (d + d*)^{2} = dd* + d*d. From the definition ∆_{0} f = ∆f. Moreover ∆_{1}(p dx+ q dy) = (∆p) dx + (∆q) dy and ∆_{2}(f dx∧dy) = (∆f)dx∧dy. This allows the Hodge decomposition to be generalised to include 1-forms and 2-forms:

- Hodge theorem. Ω^{k}(T^{2}) = ker d $\cap$ ker d∗ $\oplus$ im d $\oplus$ im ∗d = ker d $\cap$ ker d* $\oplus$ im d $\oplus$ im d*. In the Hilbert space completion of Ω^{k}(T^{2}) the orthogonal complement of im d $\oplus$ im ∗d is ker d $\cap$ ker d∗, the finite-dimensional space of harmonic k-forms, i.e. the constant k-forms. In particular in Ω^{k}(T^{2}) , ker d / im d = ker d $\cap$ ker d*, the space of harmonic k-forms. Thus the de Rham cohomology of T^{2} is given by harmonic (i.e. constant) k-forms.

From the Hodge decomposition on functions, Ω^{k}(T^{2}) = ker ∆_{k} $\oplus$ im ∆_{k}. Since ∆_{k} = dd* + d*d, ker ∆_{k} = ker d $\cap$ ker d*. Moreover im (dd* + d*d) ⊊ im d $\oplus$ im d*. Since ker d $\cap$ ker d* is orthogonal to this direct sum, it follows that Ω^{k}(T^{2}) = ker d $\cap$ ker d* $\oplus$ im d $\oplus$ im d*. The last assertion follows because ker d contains ker d $\cap$ ker d* $\oplus$ im d and is orthogonal to im d* = im ∗d.

== Hilbert space of 1-forms ==
In the case of the compact Riemann surface C / Λ, the theory of Sobolev spaces shows that the Hilbert space completion of smooth 1-forms can be decomposed as the sum of three pairwise orthogonal spaces, the closure of exact 1-forms df, the closure of coexact 1-forms ∗df and the harmonic 1-forms (the 2-dimensional space of constant 1-forms). The method of orthogonal projection of Weyl (1940) puts Riemann's approach to the Dirichlet principle on sound footing by generalizing this decomposition to arbitrary Riemann surfaces.

If X is a Riemann surface Ω^{1}_{c}(X) denote the space of continuous 1-forms with compact support. It admits the complex inner product

$$\displaystyle{(\alpha,\beta) = \int_{X} \alpha \wedge \star\overline{\beta},}$$

for α and β in Ω^{1}_{c}(X). Let H denote the Hilbert space completion of Ω^{1}_{c}(X). Although H can be interpreted in terms of measurable functions, like Sobolev spaces on tori it can be studied directly using only elementary functional analytic techniques involving Hilbert spaces and bounded linear operators.

Let H_{1} denote the closure of d C^{∞}_{c}(X) and H_{2} denote the closure of ∗d C^{∞}_{c}(X). Since (df,∗dg) = ∫_{X} df ∧ dg̅ = ∫_{X} d (f dg̅) = 0, these are orthogonal subspaces. Let H_{0} denote the orthogonal complement (H_{1} $\oplus$ H_{2})^{⊥} = H^{⊥}_{1} $\cap$ H^{⊥}_{2}.

Theorem (Hodge−Weyl decomposition). H = H_{0} $\oplus$ H_{1} $\oplus$ H_{2}. The subspace H_{0} consists of square integrable harmonic 1-forms on X, i.e. 1-forms ω such that dω = 0, d∗ω = 0 and ||ω||^{2} = ∫_{X} ω ∧ ∗ω̅ < ∞.

- Every square integrable continuous 1-form lies in H.

The space of continuous 1-forms of compact support is contained in the space of square integrable continuous 1-forms. They are both inner product spaces for the above inner product. So it suffices to show that any square integrable continuous 1-form can be approximated by continuous 1-forms of compact support. Let ω be a continuous square integrable 1-form, Thus the positive density Ω = ω ∧ ∗ω̅ is integrable and there are continuous functions of compact support ψ_{n} with 0 ≤ ψ_{n} ≤ 1 such that ∫_{X} ψ_{n} Ω tends to ∫_{X} Ω = ||ω||^{2}. Let φ_{n} = 1 − (1 − ψ_{n})^{1/2}, a continuous function of compact support with 0 ≤ φ_{n} ≤ 1. Then ω_{n} = φ_{n} ⋅ ω tends to ω in H, since ||ω − ω_{n}||^{2} = ∫_{X} (1 − ψ_{n}) Ω tends to 0.

- If ω in H is such that ψ ⋅ ω is continuous for every ψ in C_{c}(X), then ω is a square integrable continuous 1-form.

Note that the multiplication operator m(φ) given by m(φ)α = φ ⋅ α for φ in C_{c}(X) and α in Ω^{1}_{c}(X) satisfies ||m(φ)α|| ≤ ||φ||_{∞} ||α||, where ||φ||_{∞} = sup |φ|. Thus m(φ) defines a bounded linear operator with operator norm ||m(φ)|| ≤ ||φ||_{∞}. It extends continuously to a bounded linear operator on H with the same operator norm. For every open set U with compact closure, there is a continuous function φ of compact support with 0 ≤ φ ≤ 1 with φ ≅ 1 on U. Then φ ⋅ ω is continuous on U so defines a unique continuous form ω_{U} on U. If V is another open set intersecting U, then ω_{U} = ω_{V} on U $\cap$ V: in fact if z lies in U $\cap$ V and ψ in C_{c}(U $\cap$ V) ⊂ C_{c}(X) with ψ = 1 near z, then ψ ⋅ ω_{U} = ψ ⋅ ω = ψ ⋅ ω_{V}, so that ω_{U} = ω_{V} near z. Thus the ω_{U}'s patch together to give a continuous 1-form ω_{0} on X. By construction, ψ ⋅ ω = ψ ⋅ ω_{0} for every ψ in C_{c}(X). In particular for φ in C_{c}(X) with 0 ≤ φ ≤ 1, ∫ φ ⋅ ω_{0} ∧ ∗ω̅_{0̅} = ||φ^{1/2} ⋅ ω_{0}||^{2} = ||φ^{1/2} ⋅ ω||^{2} ≤ ||ω||^{2}. So ω_{0} ∧ ∗ω̅_{0̅} is integrable and hence ω_{0} is square integrable, so an element of H. On the other hand ω can be approximated by ω_{n} in Ω^{1}_{c}(X). Take ψ_{n} in C_{c}(X) with 0 ≤ ψ_{n} ≤ 1 with ψ_{n} ⋅ ω_{n} = ω_{n}. Since real-valued continuous functions are closed under lattice operations. it can further be assumed that ∫ ψ^{2}_{n} ω_{0} ∧ ∗ω̅_{0̅}, and hence ∫ ψ_{n} ω_{0} ∧ ∗ω̅_{0̅}, increase to ||ω_{0}||^{2}. But then ||ψ_{n} ⋅ ω − ω|| and ||ψ_{n} ⋅ ω_{0} − ω_{0}|| tend to 0. Since ψ_{n} ⋅ ω = ψ_{n} ⋅ ω_{0}, this shows that ω = ω_{0}.

- Every square integrable harmonic 1-form ω lies in H_{0}.

This is immediate because ω lies in H and, for f a smooth function of compact support, (df,ω) = ∫_{X} df ∧ ∗ω = −∫_{X} f d∗ω = 0 and (∗df,ω) = ∫_{X} df ∧ ω = − ∫_{X} f dω = 0.

- Every element of H_{0} is given by a square integrable harmonic 1-form.

Let ω be an element of H_{0} and for fixed p in X fix a chart U in X containing p which is conformally equivalent by a map f to a disc D ⊂ T^{2} with f(0) = p. The identification map from Ω^{1}_{c}(U) onto Ω^{1}_{c}(D) and hence into Ω^{1}(T^{2}) preserves norms (up to a constant factor). Let K be the closure of Ω^{1}_{c}(U) in H. Then the above map extends uniquely to an isometry T of K into H_{0}(T^{2})dx $\oplus$ H_{0}(T^{2})dy. Moreover if ψ is in C^{∞}_{c}(U) then T m(ψ) = m(ψ ∘ f) T. The identification map T is also compatible with d and the Hodge star operator. Let D_{1} be a smaller concentric disk in T^{2} and set V = f(V). Take φ in C^{∞}_{c}(U) with φ ≡ 1 on V. Then (m(φ) ω,dh) = 0 = (m(φ) ω,∗dh) for h in C^{∞}_{c}(V). Hence, if ω_{1} = m(φ)ω and ω_{2} = T(ω_{1}), then (ω_{2}, dg) = 0 = (ω_{2}, ∗dg) for g in C^{∞}_{c}(D_{1}).

Write ω_{2} = a dx + b dy with a and b in H_{0}(T^{2}). The conditions above imply (dω_{1}, ∗g) = 0 = (d∗ ω_{1}, ∗g). Replacing ∗g by dω_{3} with ω_{3} a smooth 1-form supported in D_{1}, it follows that ∆_{1} ω_{2} = 0 on D_{1}. Thus ∆a = 0 = ∆b on D_{1}. Hence by Weyl's lemma, a and b are harmonic on D_{1}. In particular both of them, and hence ω_{2}, are smooth on D_{1}; and dω_{2} = 0 = d∗ω_{2} on D_{1}. Transporting these equations back to X, it follows that ω_{1} is smooth on V and dω_{1} = 0 = d∗ω_{1} on V. Since ω_{1} = m(φ)ω and p was an arbitrary point, this implies in particular that m(ψ)ω is continuous for every ψ in C_{c}(X). So ω is continuous and square integrable.

But then ω is smooth on V and dω = 0 = d∗ω on V. Again since p was arbitrary, this implies ω is smooth on X and dω = 0 = d∗ω on X, so that ω is a harmonic 1-form on X.

From the formulas for the Dolbeault operators $\partial$ and $\bar{\partial}$, it follows that

$$\displaystyle{d C^\infty_c(X) \oplus * d C^\infty_c(X) = \partial C^\infty_c(X) \oplus  \overline{\partial}C^\infty_c(X),}$$

where both sums are orthogonal. The two subspaces in the second sum correspond to the ±i eigenspaces of the Hodge ∗ operator. Denoting their closures by H_{3} and H_{4}, it follows that H^{⊥}_{0} = H_{3} ⊕ H_{4} and that these subspaces are interchanged by complex conjugation. The smooth 1-forms in H_{1}, H_{2}, H_{3} or H_{4} have a simple description.

- A smooth 1-form in H_{1} has the form df for f smooth.
- A smooth 1-form in H_{2} has the form ∗df for f smooth.
- A smooth 1-form in H_{3} has the form $\partial$f for f smooth.
- A smooth 1-form in H_{3} has the form $\bar{\partial}$f for f smooth.

In fact, in view of the decompositions of H^{⊥}_{0} and its invariance under the Hodge star operation, it suffices to prove the first of these assertions. Since H_{1} is invariant under complex conjugation, it may be assumed that α is a smooth real 1-form in H_{1}. It is therefore a limit in H_{1} of forms df_{n} with f_{n} smooth of compact support. The 1-form α must be closed since, for any real-valued f in C^{∞}_{c}(X),

$$\int_X f \, d\alpha = -\int_X df \wedge \alpha=  (\alpha,*df)=0,$$

so that dα = 0. To prove that α is exact it suffices to prove that ∫_{X} α ∧ ∗β = 0 for any smooth closed real 1-form β of compact support. But by Green's formula

$$\int_X \alpha \wedge \star \beta = (\alpha,\beta) = \lim (df_n,\beta)= \lim \int_X df_n \wedge \beta=\lim \int_X d(f_n\beta)=0.$$

The above characterisations have an immediate corollary:

- A smooth 1-form α in H^{⊥}_{0} can be decomposed uniquely as α = da + ∗db = ∂f + ∂g, with a, b, f and g smooth and all the summands square integrable.

Combined with the previous Hodge–Weyl decomposition and the fact that an element of H_{0} is automatically smooth, this immediately implies:

Theorem (smooth Hodge–Weyl decomposition). If α is a smooth square integrable 1-form then α can be written uniquely as α = ω + da + *db = ω + ∂f + ∂g with ω harmonic, square integrable and a, b, f, g smooth with square integrable differentials.

== Holomorphic 1-forms with a double pole ==
The following result—reinterpreted in the next section in terms of harmonic functions and the Dirichlet principle—is the key tool for proving the uniformization theorem for simply connected, or more generally planar, Riemann surfaces.

Theorem. If X is a Riemann surface and P is a point on X with local coordinate z, there is a unique holomorphic differential 1-form ω with a double pole at P, so that the singular part of ω is z^{−2}dz near P, and regular everywhere else, such that ω is square integrable on the complement of a neighbourhood of P and the real part of ω is exact on X \ {P}.

The double pole condition is invariant under holomorphic coordinate change z $\mapsto$ z + az^{2} + ⋯. There is an analogous result for poles of order greater than 2 where the singular part of ω has the form z^{–k}dz with k > 2, although this condition is not invariant under holomorphic coordinate change.

To prove uniqueness, note that if ω_{1} and ω_{2} are two solutions then their difference ω = ω_{1} − ω_{2} is a square integrable holomorphic 1-form which is exact on X \ {P}. Thus near P, ω = f(z) dz with f holomorphic near z = 0. There is a holomorphic function g on X \ {P} such that ω = dg there. But then g must coincide with a primitive of f near z = 0, so that ω = dg everywhere. But then ω lies in H_{0} ∩ H_{1} = (0), i.e. ω = 0.

To prove existence, take a bump function 0 ≤ ψ ≤ 1 in C^{∞}_{c}(X) with support in a neighbourhood of P of the form |z| < ε and such that ψ ≡ 1 near P. Set

$$\alpha =-d \left({\psi(z)\over z}\right),$$

so that α equals z^{–2}dz near P, vanishes off a neighbourhood of P and is exact on X \ {P}. Let β = α − i∗α, a smooth (0,1) form on X, vanishing near z = 0, since it is a (1,0) form there, and vanishing off a larger neighbourhood of P. By the smooth Hodge−Weyl decomposition, β can be decomposed as β = ω_{0} + da – i∗da with ω_{0} a harmonic and square integrable (0,1) form and a smooth with square integrable differential. Now set γ = α – da = ω_{0} + i∗α − i∗da and ω = Re γ + i∗ Re γ. Then α is exact on X \ {P}; hence so is γ, as well as its real part, which is also the real part of ω. Near P, the 1-form ω differs from z^{–2}dz by a smooth (1,0) form. It remains to prove that $\bar{\partial}$ω = 0 on X \ {P}; or equivalently that Re γ is harmonic on X \ {P}. In fact γ is harmonic on X \ {P}; for dγ = dα − d(da) = 0 on X \ {P} because α is exact there; and similarly d∗γ = 0 using the formula γ = ω_{0} + i∗α − i∗da and the fact that ω_{0} is harmonic.

Corollary of proof. If X is a Riemann surface and P is a point on X with local coordinate z, there is a unique real-valued 1-form δ which is harmonic on X \ {P} such that δ – Re z^{−2}dz is harmonic near z = 0 (the point P) such that δ is square integrable on the complement of a neighbourhood of P. Moreover, if h is any real-valued smooth function on X with dh square integrable and h vanishing near P, then (δ,dh) = 0.

Existence follows by taking δ = Re γ = Re ω above. Since ω = δ + i∗δ, the uniqueness of ω implies the uniqueness of δ. Alternatively if δ_{1} and δ_{2} are two solutions, their difference η = δ_{1} – δ_{2} has no singularity at P and is harmonic on X \ {P}. It is therefore harmonic in a neighbourhood of P and therefore everywhere. So η lies in H_{0}. But also η is exact on X \ P and hence on the whole of X, so it also lies in H_{1}. But then it must lie in H_{0} ∩ H_{1} = (0), so that η = 0. Finally, if N is the closure of a neighbourhood of P disjoint from the support of h and Y = X \ N, then δ|_{Y} lies in H_{0}(Y) and dh lies in the space H_{1}(Y) so that

$$(\delta,dh) =\int_X \delta \wedge \star dh = \int_Y \delta \wedge \star dh = (\delta|_Y,dh)_Y = 0.$$

== Dirichlet's principle on a Riemann surface ==
Theorem. If X is a Riemann surface and P is a point on X with local coordinate z, there is a unique real-valued harmonic function u on X \ {P} such that u(z) – Re z^{−1} is harmonic near z = 0 (the point P) such that du is square integrable on the complement of a neighbourhood of P. Moreover, if h is any real-valued smooth function on X with dh square integrable and h vanishing near P, then (du,dh)=0.

In fact this result is immediate from the theorem and corollary in the previous section. The harmonic form δ constructed there is the real part of a holomorphic form ω = dg where g is holomorphic function on X with a simple pole at P with residue -1, i.e. g(z) = –z^{−1} + a_{0} + a_{1}z + a_{2} z^{2} + ⋯ near z = 0. So u = - Re g gives a solution with the claimed properties since δ = −du and hence (du,dh) = −(δ,dh) = 0.

This result can be interpreted in terms of Dirichlet's principle. Let D_{R} be a parametric disk |z| < R about P (the point z = 0) with R > 1. Let α = −d(ψz^{−1}), where 0 ≤ ψ ≤ 1 is a bump function supported in D = D_{1}, identically 1 near z = 0. Let α_{1} = −χ_{D}(z) Re d(z^{−1}) where χ_{D} is the characteristic function of D. Let γ= Re α and γ_{1} = Re α_{1}. Since χ_{D} can be approximated by bump functions in L^{2}, γ_{1} − γ lies in the real Hilbert space of 1-forms Re H; similarly α_{1} − α lies in H. Dirichlet's principle states that the distance function

F(ξ) = ||γ_{1} − γ – ξ||

on Re H_{1} is minimised by a smooth 1-form ξ_{0} in Re H_{1}. In fact −du coincides with the minimising 1-form: γ + ξ_{0} = −du.

This version of Dirichlet's principle is easy to deduce from the previous construction of du. By definition ξ_{0} is the orthogonal projection of γ_{1} – γ onto Re H_{1} for the real inner product Re (η_{1},η_{2}) on H, regarded as a real inner product space. It coincides with the real part of the orthogonal projection ω_{1} of α_{1} – α onto H_{1} for the complex inner product on H. Since the Hodge star operator is a unitary map on H swapping H_{1} and H_{2}, ω_{2} = ∗ω_{1} is the orthogonal projection of ∗(α_{1} – α) onto H_{2}. On the other hand, ∗α_{1} = −i α_{1}, since α is a (1,0) form. Hence

(α_{1} – α) − i∗(α_{1} – α) = ω_{0} + ω_{1} + ω_{2},

with ω_{k} in H_{k}. But the left hand side equals –α + i∗α = −β, with β defined exactly as in the preceding section, so this coincides with the previous construction.

Further discussion of Dirichlet's principle on a Riemann surface can be found in Hurwitz & Courant (1929), Ahlfors (1947), Courant (1950), Schiffer & Spencer (1954), Pfluger (1957) and Ahlfors & Sario (1960).

Historical note. Weyl (1913) proved the existence of the harmonic function u by giving a direct proof of Dirichlet's principle. In Weyl (1940), he presented his method of orthogonal projection which has been adopted in the presentation above, following Springer (1957), but with the theory of Sobolev spaces on T^{2} used to prove elliptic regularity without using measure theory. In the expository texts Weyl (1955) and Kodaira (2007), both authors avoid invoking results on measure theory: they follow Weyl's original approach for constructing harmonic functions with singularities via Dirichlet's principle. In Weyl's method of orthogonal projection, Lebesgue's theory of integration had been used to realise Hilbert spaces of 1-forms in terms of measurable 1-forms, although the 1-forms to be constructed were smooth or even analytic away from their singularity. In the preface to Weyl (1955), referring to the extension of his method of orthogonal projection to higher dimensions by Kodaira (1949), Weyl writes:

"Influenced by Kodaira's work, I have hesitated a moment as to whether I should not replace the Dirichlet principle by the essentially equivalent "method of orthogonal projection" which is treated in a paper of mine. But for reasons the explication of which would lead too far afield here, I have stuck to the old approach."

In Kodaira (2007), after giving a brief exposition of the method of orthogonal projection and making reference to Weyl's writings, Kodaira explains:

"I first planned to prove Dirichlet's Principle using the method of orthogonal projection in this book. However, I did not like to have to use the concept of Lebesgue measurability only for the proof of Dirichlet's Principle and therefore I rewrote it in such a way that I did not have to."

The methods of Hilbert spaces, L^{p} spaces and measure theory appear in the non-classical theory of Riemann surfaces (the study of moduli spaces of Riemann surfaces) through the Beltrami equation and Teichmüller theory.

== Holomorphic 1-forms with two single poles ==
Theorem. Given a Riemann surface X and two distinct points A and B on X, there is a holomorphic 1-form on X with simple poles at the two points with non-zero residues having sum zero such that the 1-form is square integrable on the complement of any open neighbourhoods of the two points.

The proof is similar to the proof of the result on holomorphic 1-forms with a single double pole. The result is first proved when A and B are close and lie in a parametric disk. Indeed, once this is proved, a sum of 1-forms for a chain of sufficiently close points between A and B will provide the required 1-form, since the intermediate singular terms will cancel. To construct the 1-form for points corresponding to a and b in a parametric disk, the previous construction can be used starting with the 1-form

$$\alpha = d\left (\psi(z) \log{z-a\over z-b}\right),$$

which locally has the form

$${dz\over z-a} - {dz\over z-b}.$$

== Poisson equation ==
Theorem (Poisson equation). If Ω is a smooth 2-form of compact support on a Riemann surface X, then Ω can be written as Ω = ∆f where f is a smooth function with df square integrable if and only if ∫_{X} Ω = 0.

In fact, Ω can be written as Ω = dα with α a smooth 1-form of compact support: indeed, using partitions of unity, this reduces to the case of a smooth 2-form of compact support on a rectangle. Indeed Ω can be written as a finite sum of 2-forms each supported in a parametric rectangle and having integral zero. For each of these 2-forms the result follows from Poincaré's lemma with compact support. Writing α = ω + da + *db, it follows that Ω = d*db = ∆b.

In the case of the simply connected Riemann surfaces C, D and S= C ∪ ∞, the Riemann surfaces are symmetric spaces G / K for the groups G = R^{2}, SL(2,R) and SU(2). The methods of group representation theory imply the operator ∆ is G-invariant, so that its fundamental solution is given by right convolution by a function on K \ G / K. Thus in these cases Poisson's equation can be solved by an explicit integral formula. It is easy to verify that this explicit solution tends to 0 at ∞, so that in the case of these surfaces there is a solution f tending to 0 at ∞. Donaldson (2011) proves this directly for simply connected surfaces and uses it to deduce the uniformization theorem.

== See also ==
- Differentials of the first kind
- Abelian differential
- Dolbeault complex
