= Hilbert's twenty-fourth problem =

Criteria of simplicity for mathematical proofs

Hilbert's twenty-fourth problem is a mathematical problem that was not published as part of the list of 23 problems (known as Hilbert's problems) but was included in David Hilbert's original notes. The problem asks for a criterion of simplicity in mathematical proofs and the development of a proof theory with the power to prove that a given proof is the simplest possible.

The 24th problem was rediscovered by German historian Rüdiger Thiele in 2000, noting that Hilbert did not include the 24th problem in the lecture presenting Hilbert's problems or any published texts. Hilbert's friends and fellow mathematicians Adolf Hurwitz and Hermann Minkowski were closely involved in the project but did not have any knowledge of this problem.

This is the full text from Hilbert's notes given in Rüdiger Thiele's paper. The section was translated by Rüdiger Thiele.

The 24th problem in my Paris lecture was to be: Criteria of simplicity, or proof of the greatest simplicity of certain proofs. Develop a theory of the method of proof in mathematics in general. Under a given set of conditions there can be but one simplest proof. Quite generally, if there are two proofs for a theorem, you must keep going until you have derived each from the other, or until it becomes quite evident what variant conditions (and aids) have been used in the two proofs. Given two routes, it is not right to take either of these two or to look for a third; it is necessary to investigate the area lying between the two routes. Attempts at judging the simplicity of a proof are in my examination of syzygies and syzygies [Hilbert misspelled the word syzygies] between syzygies (see Hilbert 42, lectures XXXII–XXXIX). The use or the knowledge of a syzygy simplifies in an essential way a proof that a certain identity is true. Because any process of addition [is] an application of the commutative law of addition etc. [and because] this always corresponds to geometric theorems or logical conclusions, one can count these [processes], and, for instance, in proving certain theorems of elementary geometry (the Pythagoras theorem, [theorems] on remarkable points of triangles), one can very well decide which of the proofs is the simplest. [Author's note: Part of the last sentence is not only barely legible in Hilbert's notebook but also grammatically incorrect. Corrections and insertions that Hilbert made in this entry show that he wrote down the problem in haste.]

— David Hilbert, Mathematische Notizbücher

In 2002, Thiele and Larry Wos published an article on Hilbert's twenty-fourth problem with a discussion about its relation to various issues in automated reasoning, logic, and mathematics.
