= Georg Feigl =

German mathematician

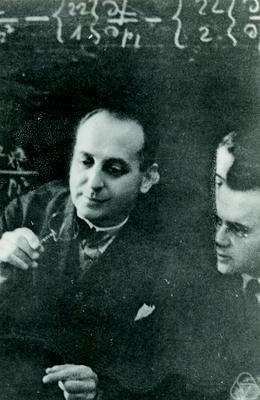
- Born: 13 October 1890; Hamburg, German Empire
- Died: 20 April 1945 (aged 54); Wechselburg, Germany
- Citizenship: German
- Education: University of Jena
- Known for: Authoring Mathematisches Wörterbuch ("Mathematical dictionary")
- Spouse: Maria (m. 1925)
- Scientific career
- Fields: Foundations of geometry, topology
- Workplaces: University of Breslau
- Doctoral advisor: Paul Koebe

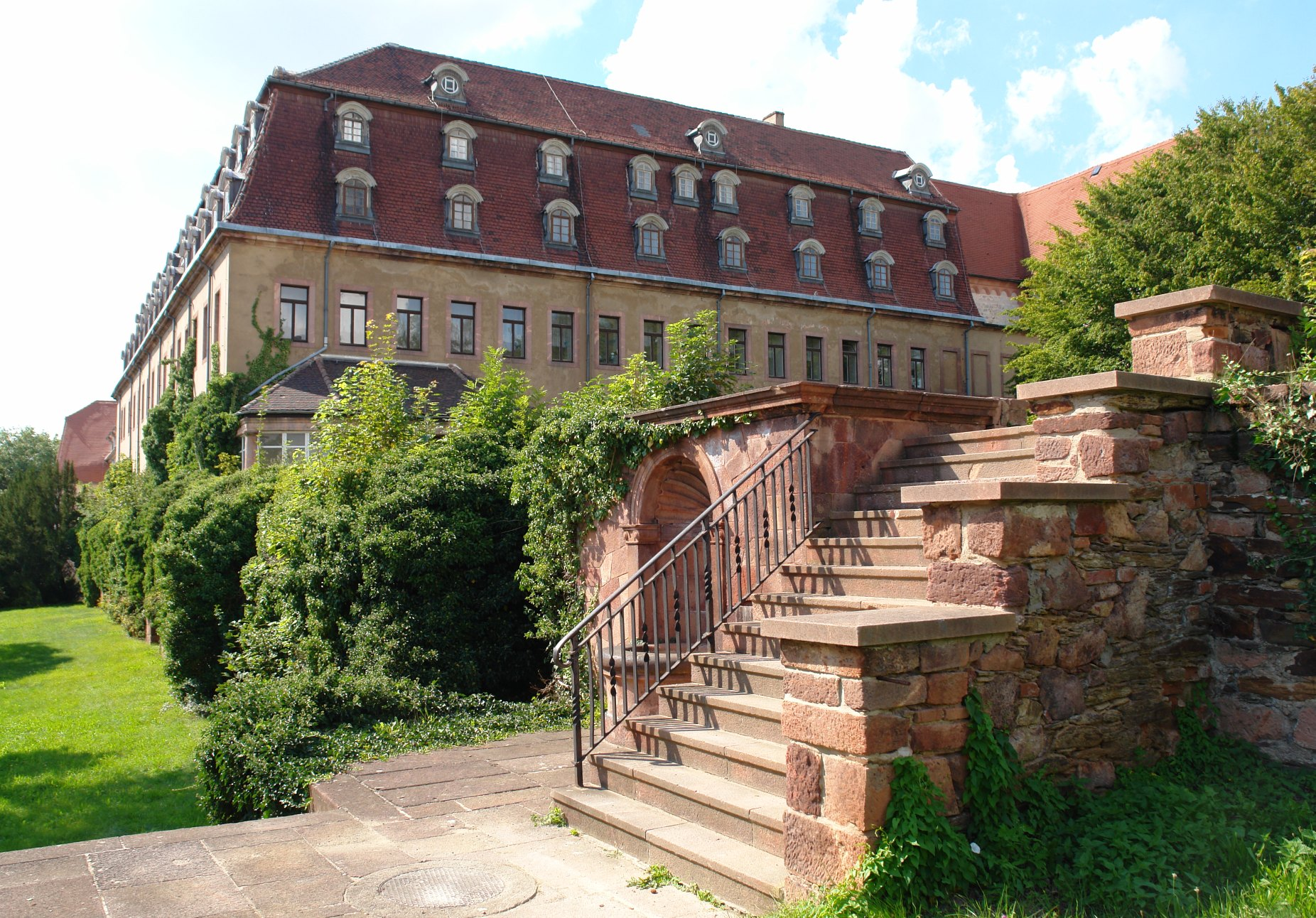
Baroque castle, Wechselburg (2007)

Georg Feigl (13 October 1890 – 20 April 1945) was a German mathematician.

== Life and work ==
Georg Feigl started studying mathematics and physics at the University of Jena in 1909. In 1918, he obtained his doctorate under Paul Koebe. From 1928 he was editor of the Jahrbuch über die Fortschritte der Mathematik ("Yearbook on the progress of mathematics"). In 1935 he became a full professor at the University of Breslau. In 1937—1941, he was an editor of the journal Deutsche Mathematik.

Feigl's main areas of work were the foundations of geometry and topology, where he studied fixed point theorems for n-dimensional manifolds.

Feigl was one of the initial authors of the Mathematisches Wörterbuch ("Mathematical dictionary"). Because of the impending siege by the Red Army he was forced to leave Breslau in January 1945 with his family and other members of the Mathematical Institute. His wife Maria was distantly related to the lord of the manor of Wechselburg castle and prepared the castle to receive the mathematicians. Feigl brought his previously developed materials for the Mathematisches Wörterbuch and asked his students to further refine it in the castle. They did not have access to books, lecture notes, calculators, or typewriters in the castle. Johann Radon (1887–1956) and Feigl were willing and able to continue lectures started in Breslau for one hour a day at Wechselburg castle, without any documents. Feigl had a severe stomach ailment and died after a few months without medication in Wechselburg. The Mathematisches Wörterbuch did not appear until 1961, when Hermann Ludwig Schmid (1908–1956) and Joseph Naas (1906–1993) published it.
