= Rüdiger Thiele =

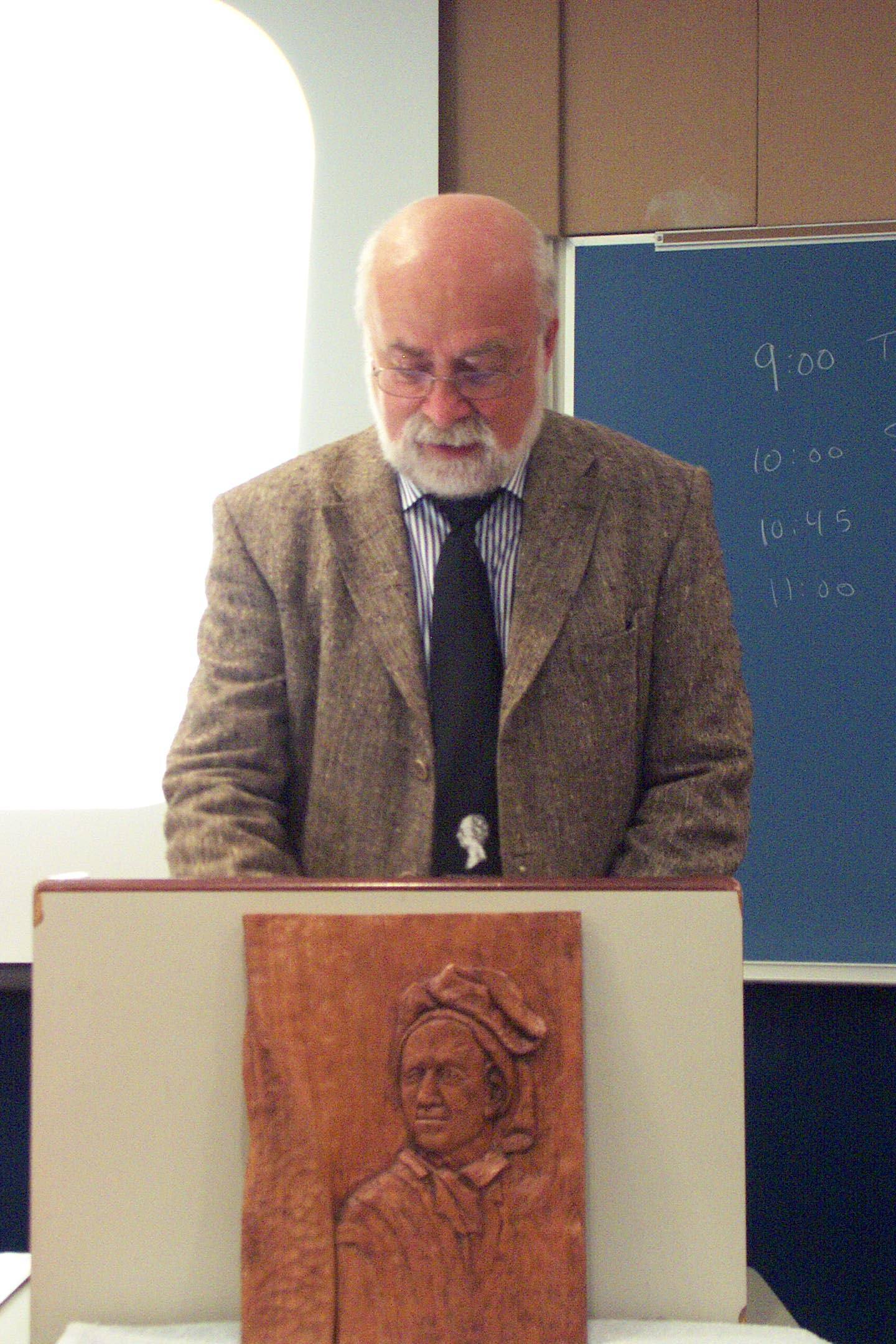
Rolf-Rüdiger Thiele

Rolf-Rüdiger Thiele (born 29 April 1943) is a German historian of mathematics, known for his historical research on Hilbert's twenty-fourth problem.

== Early life, family and education ==
Rolf-Rüdiger Thiele was born in Polepp, Bohemia (now part of the Czech Republic).

Thiele studied mathematics, physics, and psychology at the Martin Luther University of Halle-Wittenberg and received his promotion (Ph.D.) there in 1973.

== Career ==
Thiele worked in the publishing business in Leipzig for B. G. Teubner Verlag and Salomon Hirzel Verlag. From 1986 to 2008, he worked at the Karl Sudhoff Institute for the History of Medicine and Natural Sciences at the University of Leipzig. He has held visiting positions at the Johannes Gutenberg University Mainz (from 1992 to 1995 as chair for the history of natural sciences), at TU Darmstadt, at the University of Bonn (from 1995 to 1996), and at the University of Toronto.

In 2001, Thiele habilitated in the department of mathematics at the University of Hamburg with his work Von der Bernoullischen Brachistochrone zum Kalibratorkonzept (From the Bernoullian brachistochrone to the calibrator concept). His habilitation thesis was published in the series Collection de travaux de l'Académie internationale d'Histoire des Sciences , Brepols Verlag, Turnhout. In 2002, he became a privatdozent in the department of mathematics at the University of Leipzig. In 2004, he was awarded the Lester R. Ford Award of the Mathematical Association of America for his expository article on Hilbert's cancelled 24th problem. He discovered the 24th problem in an unpublished notebook among Hilbert's Nachlass (collection of manuscripts and notes). He has been the vice president of the Euler Society.

His most important works deal with the biographies of Leonhard Euler, Bartel Leendert van der Waerden, David Hilbert, Felix Klein. Central topics in his historical research are analysis and the calculus of variations. In his writings, Thiele uses numerous previously unpublished sources.

In addition to numerous book publications and specialist articles on various questions in the history of mathematics, he has published several books on mathematical games in recreational mathematics (often in collaboration with Konrad Haase).

== Selected publications ==
- Leonhard Euler. Leipzig: BSB B.G.Teubner. 1982. ISBN 3-322-00576-3.
- Er rechnete, wie andere atmen. EULERS Beiträge zum Funktionsbegriff (in German), Potsdam: Euler-Vortrag im Schlosstheater des Neuen Palais von Sanssouci, 21 May 1999
- "Hilbert's Twenty-Fourth Problem" (PDF). The American Mathematical Monthly: 1–24. January 2003.
- van Brummelen, Glen; Kinyon, Michael, eds. (2005). "The Mathematics and Science of Leonhard Euler (1707–1783)". Mathematics and the Historian's Craft. Springer, New York. pp. 81–140. ISBN 0-387-25284-3.
- Van der Waerden in Leipzig (in German), Mit einem Geleitwort von Friedrich Hirzebruch (Gutenbergplatz Leipzig ed.), Leipzig, 2009, ISBN 978-3-937219-36-3 – via eagle-leipzig.de
- Felix Klein in Leipzig (in German) (Gutenbergplatz Leipzig ed.), Leipzig, 2011, ISBN 978-3-937219-47-9 – via eagle-leipzig.de
- "Felix Klein in Leipzig 1880–1886". Jahresbericht der Deutschen Mathematiker-Vereinigung. 102 (2): 69. 2000.
- Mathematische Beweise (in German). Harri Deutsch. 1979.
- Von der Bernoullischen Brachistochrone zum Kalibrator-Konzept: ein historischer Abriß zur Entstehung der Feldtheorie in der Variationsrechnung. Habilitation. Turnhout, Brepols 2007.
- With Konrad Haase:
  - Der verzauberte Raum-Spiele in drei Dimensionen (in German). Leipzig: Urania Verlag. 1991.
  - 100 Fünf-Minuten-Spiele: Zeitvertreib für Singles (in German). Berlin. 1990.
- Die gefesselte Zeit: Spiele, Spaß und Strategien (in German). Urania Verlag. 1984.
- Das große Spielvergnügen: mit Würfeln, Streichhölzern, Papier, Schachfiguren, Dominos und Labyrinthen (in German). Hugendubel. 1984.

== Sources ==
- Kürschners Deutscher Gelehrten-Kalender 1992
- Marquis Who's Who in the World
