= Hilbert's twenty-third problem =

Promotes work on calculus of variations

Hilbert's twenty-third problem is the last of Hilbert problems set out in a celebrated list compiled in 1900 by David Hilbert. In contrast with Hilbert's other 22 problems, his 23rd is not so much a specific "problem" as an encouragement towards further development of the calculus of variations. His statement of the problem is a summary of the state-of-the-art (in 1900) of the theory of calculus of variations, with some introductory comments decrying the lack of work that had been done of the theory in the mid to late 19th century.

== Original statement ==
The problem statement begins with the following paragraph:

So far, I have generally mentioned problems as definite and special as possible.... Nevertheless, I should like to close with a general problem, namely with the indication of a branch of mathematics repeatedly mentioned in this lecture-which, in spite of the considerable advancement lately given it by Weierstrass, does not receive the general appreciation which, in my opinion, it is due—I mean the calculus of variations.

== Calculus of variations ==
Calculus of variations is a field of mathematical analysis that deals with maximizing or minimizing functionals, which are mappings from a set of functions to the real numbers. Functionals are often expressed as definite integrals involving functions and their derivatives. The interest is in extremal functions that make the functional attain a maximum or minimum value – or stationary functions – those where the rate of change of the functional is zero.

== Progress ==
Following the problem statement, David Hilbert, Emmy Noether, Leonida Tonelli, Henri Lebesgue and Jacques Hadamard among others made significant contributions to the calculus of variations. Marston Morse applied calculus of variations in what is now called Morse theory. Lev Pontryagin, Ralph Rockafellar and F. H. Clarke developed new mathematical tools for the calculus of variations in optimal control theory. The dynamic programming of Richard Bellman is an alternative to the calculus of variations.
