= Hilbert's eleventh problem =

Classify quadratic forms over algebraic number fields

Hilbert's eleventh problem is one of David Hilbert's list of open mathematical problems posed at the Second International Congress of Mathematicians in Paris in 1900. A furthering of the theory of quadratic forms, he stated the problem as follows:

Our present knowledge of the theory of quadratic number fields puts us in a position to attack successfully the theory of quadratic forms with any number of variables and with any algebraic numerical coefficients. This leads in particular to the interesting problem: to solve a given quadratic equation with algebraic numerical coefficients in any number of variables by integral or fractional numbers belonging to the algebraic realm of rationality determined by the coefficients.

As stated by Kaplansky, "The 11th Problem is simply this: classify quadratic forms over algebraic number fields." This is exactly what Minkowski did for quadratic form with fractional coefficients. A quadratic form (not quadratic equation) is any polynomial in which each term has variables appearing exactly twice. For a binary quadratic form, that is a quadratic form in two variables, the general form of such an expression is ax^{2} + bxy + cy^{2}. (All coefficients must be whole numbers.)

A given quadratic form is said to represent a natural number if substituting specific numbers for the variables gives the number. Gauss and those who followed found that if we change variables in certain ways, the new quadratic form represented the same natural numbers as the old, but in a different, more easily interpreted form. He used this theory of equivalent quadratic forms to prove number theory results. Lagrange, for example, had shown that any natural number can be expressed as the sum of four squares. Gauss proved this using his theory of equivalence relations by showing that the quadratic $w^2 + x^2 + y^2 + z^2$ represents all natural numbers. As mentioned earlier, Minkowski created and proved a similar theory for quadratic forms that had fractions as coefficients. Hilbert's eleventh problem asks for a similar theory. That is, a mode of classification so we can tell if one form is equivalent to another, but in the case where coefficients can be algebraic numbers. Helmut Hasse's accomplished this in a proof using his local-global principle and the fact that the theory is relatively simple for p-adic systems in October 1920. He published his work in 1923 and 1924. See Hasse principle, Hasse–Minkowski theorem. The local-global principle says that a general result about a rational number or even all rational numbers can often be established by verifying that the result holds true for each of the p-adic number systems.

There is also more recent work on Hilbert's eleventh problem studying when an integer can be represented by a quadratic form. An example is the work of Cogdell, Piatetski-Shapiro and Sarnak.

== See also ==
- Hilbert's problems
