= Planar Riemann surface =

In mathematics, a planar Riemann surface (or schlichtartig Riemann surface) is a Riemann surface sharing the topological properties of a connected open subset of the Riemann sphere. They are characterized by the topological property that the complement of every closed Jordan curve in the Riemann surface has two connected components. An equivalent characterization is the differential geometric property that every closed differential 1-form of compact support is exact. Every simply connected Riemann surface is planar. The class of planar Riemann surfaces was studied by Koebe who proved in 1910, as a generalization of the uniformization theorem, that every such surface is conformally equivalent to either the Riemann sphere or the complex plane with slits parallel to the real axis removed.

== Elementary properties ==
- A closed 1-form ω is exact if and only if ∫_{γ} ω = 0 for every closed Jordan curve γ.

This follows from the Poincaré lemma for 1-forms and the fact that ∫_{δ} df = f(δ(b)) – f(δ(a)) for a path δ parametrized by [a, b] and f a smooth function defined on an open neighbourhood of δ([a, b]). This formula for ∫_{δ} df extends by continuity to continuous paths, and hence vanishes for a closed path. Conversely if ∫_{γ} ω = 0 for every closed Jordan curve γ, then a function f(z) can be defined on X by fixing a point w and taking any piecewise smooth path δ from w to z and set f(z) = ∫_{δ} ω. The assumption implies that f is independent of the path. To check that df = ω, it suffices to check this locally. Fix z_{0} and take a path δ_{1} from w to z_{0}. Near z_{0} the Poincaré lemma implies ω = dg for some smooth function g defined in a neighbourhood of z_{0}. If δ_{2} is a path from z_{0} to z, then f(z) = ∫_{δ_{1}} ω + ∫_{δ_{2}} ω = ∫_{δ_{1}} ω + g(z) − g(z_{0}), so f differs from g by a constant near z_{0}. Hence df = dg = ω near z_{0}.

- A closed Jordan curve γ on a Riemann surface separates the surface into two disjoint connected regions if and only if ∫_{γ} ω = 0 for every closed 1-form ω of compact support.

If the closed Jordan curve γ separates the surface, it is homotopic to a smooth Jordan curve δ (with non-vanishing derivative) that separates the surface into two halves. The integral of dω over each half equals ± ∫_{δ} ω by Stokes' theorem. Since dω = 0, it follows that ∫_{δ} ω = 0. Hence ∫_{γ} ω = 0.

Conversely suppose γ is a Jordan curve that does not separate the Riemann surface. Replacing γ by a homotopic curve, it may be assumed that γ is a smooth Jordan curve δ with non-vanishing derivative. Since γ does not separate the surface, there is a smooth Jordan curve δ (with non-vanishing derivative) which cuts γ transversely at only one point. An open neighbourhood of γ ∪ δ is diffeomorphic to an open neighbourhood of corresponding Jordan curves in a torus. A model for this can be taken as the square [−π,π]×[−π,π] in R^{2} with opposite sides identified; the transverse Jordan curves γ and δ correspond to the x and y axes. Let ω = a(x) dx with a ≥ 0 supported near 0 with ∫ a = 1. Thus ω is a closed 1-form supported in an open neighbourhood of δ with ∫_{γ} ω = 1 ≠ 0.

- A Riemann surface is planar if and only if every closed 1-form of compact support is exact.

Let ω be a closed 1-form of compact support on a planar Riemann surface. If γ is a closed Jordan curve on the surface, then it separates the surface. Hence ∫_{γ} ω = 0. Since this is true for all closed Jordan curves, ω must be exact.

Conversely suppose that every closed 1-form of compact support is exact. Let γ be closed Jordan curve. Let ω be closed 1-form of compact support. Because ω must be exact, ∫_{γ} ω = 0. It follows that γ on separates the surface into two disjoint connected regions. So the surface is planar.

- Every connected open subset of a planar Riemann surface is planar.

This is immediate from the characterization in terms of 1-forms.

- Every simply connected Riemann surface is planar.

If ω is a closed 1-form of compact support, the integral ∫_{γ} ω is independent of the homotopy class of γ. In a simply connected Riemann surface, every closed curve is homotopic to a constant curve for which the integral is zero. Hence a simply connected Riemann surface is planar.

- If ω is a closed 1-form on a simply connected Riemann surface, ∫_{γ} ω = 0 for every closed Jordan curve γ.

This is the so-called "monodromy property." Covering the path with disks and using the Poincaré lemma for ω, by the fundamental theorem of calculus successive parts of the integral can be computed as f(γ(t_{i})) − f(γ(t_{i − 1})). Since the curve is closed, γ(t_{N}) = γ(t_{0}), so that the sums cancel.

== Uniformization theorem ==
Koebe's Theorem. A compact planar Riemann surface X is conformally equivalent to the Riemann sphere. A non-compact planar Riemann surface X is conformally equivalent either to the complex plane or to the complex plane with finitely many closed intervals parallel to the real axis removed.

- The harmonic function U. If X is a Riemann surface and P is a point on X with local coordinate z, there is a unique real-valued harmonic function U on X \ {P} such that U(z) – Re z^{−1} is harmonic near z = 0 (the point P) and dU is square integrable on the complement of a neighbourhood of P. Moreover, if h is any real-valued smooth function on X vanishing in a neighbourhood of P of U with ||dh||^{2} = ∫_{X} dh∧∗dh < ∞, then (dU,dh) = ∫_{X} dU ∧ *dh = 0.

This is an immediate consequence of Dirichlet's principle in a planar surface; it can also be proved using Weyl's method of orthogonal projection in the space of square integrable 1-forms.

- The conjugate harmonic function V. There is a harmonic function V on X \ {P} such that ∗dU = dV. In the local coordinate z, V(z) − Im z^{−1} is harmonic near z = 0. The function V is uniquely determined up to the addition of a real constant. The function U and its harmonic conjugate V satisfy the Cauchy-Riemann equations U_{x} = V_{y} and U_{y} = − V_{x}.

It suffices to prove that ∫_{C} ∗dU = 0 for any piecewise smooth Jordan curve in X \ {P}. Since X is planar, the complement of C in X has two open components S_{1} and S_{2} with P lying in S_{2}. There is an open neighborhood N of C made up of a union of finite number of disks and a smooth function 0 ≤ h ≤ 1 such that h equals 1 on S_{1} and equals 0 on S_{1} away from P and N. Thus (dU,dh) = 0. By Stokes' theorem, this condition can be rewritten as ∫_{C} ∗dU = 0. So ∗dU is exact and therefore has the form dV.

- The meromorphic function f. The meromorphic differential df = dU + idV is holomorphic everywhere except for a double pole at P with singular term d(z^{−1}) at the local coordinate z.
- Koebe's separation argument. Let φ and ψ be smooth bounded real-valued functions on R with bounded first derivatives such that φ'(t) > 0 for all t ≠ 0 and φ vanishes to infinite order at t = 0 while ψ(t) > 0 for t in (a,b) while ψ(t) ≡ 0 for t outside (a,b) (here a = −∞ and b = +∞ are allowed). Let X be a Riemann surface and W an open connected subset with a holomorphic function g = u + iv differing from f by a constant such that g(W) lies in the strip a < Im z < b. Define a real-valued function by h = φ(u)ψ(v) on W and 0 off W. Then h, so defined, cannot be a smooth function; for if so

$$(dh,dh)=\int_X dh\wedge \star dh = \int_W (\varphi^\prime(u)^2 \psi(v)^2 + \varphi(u)^2 \psi^\prime(v)^2) \, du \wedge \star du \le 2M^2 \, \|dU\|^2 < \infty,$$

where M = sup (|φ|, |φ'|, |ψ|, |ψ'|), and

$$(dU,dh)=\int_X dU \wedge \star dh = \int_W \varphi^\prime(u)\psi(v)\, du\wedge \star du >0,$$

contradicting the orthogonality condition on U.

- Connectivity and level curves. (1) A level curve for V divide X into two open connected regions. (2) The open set between two level curves of V is connected. (3) The level curves for U and V through any regular point of f divide X into four open connected regions, each containing the regular point and the pole of f in their closures.

(1) Since V is only defined up to a constant, it suffices to prove this for the level curve V = 0, i.e. that V = 0 divides the surface into two connected open regions. If not, there is a connected component W of the complement of V = 0 not containing P in its closure. Take g = f and a = 0 and b = ∞ if V > 0 on W and a = −∞ and b = 0 if V < 0 on W. The boundary of W lies on the level curve V = 0. Take g = f in this case. Since ψ(v) vanishes to infinite order when v = 0, h is a smooth function, so Koebe's argument gives a contradiction.

(2) It suffices to show that the open set defined by a < V < b is connected. If not, this open set has a connected component W not containing P in its closure. Take g = f in this case. The boundary of W lies on the level curves V = a and V = b. Since ψ(v) vanishes to infinite order when v = a or b, h is a smooth function, so Koebe's argument gives a contradiction.

(3) Translating f by a constant if necessary, it suffices to show that if U = 0 = V at a regular point of f, then the two level curves U = 0 and V = 0 divide the surface into 4 connected regions. The level curves U = 0, V = 0 divide the Riemann surface into four disjoint open sets ±u > 0 and ±v > 0. If one of these open sets is not connected, then it has an open connected component W not containing P in its closure. If v > 0 on W, take a = 0 and b = ÷∞; if v < 0 on W, set a = −∞ and b = 0. Take g = f in this case. The boundary of W lies on the union of the level curves U = 0 and V = 0. Since φ and ψ vanish to infinite order at 0, h is smooth function, so Koebe's argument gives a contradiction. Finally, using f as a local coordinate, the level curves divide an open neighbourhood of the regular point into four disjoint connected open sets; in particular each of the four regions is non-empty and contains the regular point in its closure; similar reasoning applies at the pole of f using f(z)^{–1} as a local coordinate.

- Univalence of f at regular points. The function f takes different values at distinct regular points (where df ≠ 0).

Suppose that f takes the same value at two regular points z and w and has a pole at ζ. Translating f by a constant if necessary, it can be assumed that f(z) = 0 = f(w). The points z, w and ζ lies in the closure of each of the four regions into which the level curves U = 0 and V = 0 divide the surface. the points z and w can be joined by a Jordan curve in the region U > 0, V > 0 apart from their endpoints. Similarly they can be joined by a Jordan curve the region U < 0, V < 0 apart from their endpoints, where the curve is transverse to the boundary. Together these curves give a closed Jordan curve γ passing through z and w. Since the Riemann surface X is planar, this Jordan curve must divide the surface into two open connected regions. The pole ζ must lie in one of these regions, Y say. Since each of the connected open regions U > 0, V < 0 and U < 0, V > 0 is disjoint from γ and intersects a neighbourhood of ζ, both must be contained in Y. On the other hand using f to define coordinates near z (or w) the curve lies in two opposite quadrants and the other two open quadrants lie in different components of the complement of the curve, a contradiction.

- Regularity of f. The meromorphic function f is regular at every point except the pole.

If f is not regular at a point, in local coordinates f has the expansion f(z) = a + b z^{m} (1 + c_{1}z + c_{2}z^{2} + ⋅⋅⋅) with b ≠ 0 and m > 1. By the argument principle—or by taking the mth root of 1 + c_{1}z + c_{2}z^{2} + ⋅⋅⋅ —away from 0 this map is m-to-one, a contradiction.

- The complement of the image of f. Either the image of f is the whole Riemann sphere C ∪ ∞, in which case the Riemann surface is compact and f gives a conformal equivalence with the Riemann sphere; or the complement of the image is a union of closed intervals and isolated points, in which case the Riemann surface is conformally equivalent to a horizontal slit region.

Considered as a holomorphic mapping from the Riemann surface X to the Riemann sphere, f is regular everywhere including at infinity. So its image Ω is open in the Riemann sphere. Since it is one-one, the inverse mapping of f is holomorphic from the image onto the Riemann surface. In particular the two are homeomorphic. If the image is the whole sphere then the first statement follows. In this case the Riemann surface is compact. Conversely if the Riemann surface is compact, its image is compact so closed. But then the image is open and closed and hence the whole Riemann sphere by connectivity. If f is not onto, the complement of the image is a closed non-empty subset of the Riemann sphere. So it is a compact subset of the Riemann sphere. It does not contain ∞. So the complement of the image is a compact subset of the complex plane. Now on the Riemann surface the open subsets a < V < b are connected. So the open set of points w in Ω with a < Im w < b is connected and hence path connected. To prove that Ω is a horizontal slit region, it is enough to show that every connected component of C \ Ω is either a single point or a compact interval parallel to the x axis. This follows once it is known that two points in the complement with different imaginary parts lie in different connect components.

Suppose then that w_{1} = u_{1} + iv_{1} and w_{2} = u_{2} + iv_{2} are points in C \ Ω with v_{1} < v_{2}. Take a point in the strip v_{1} < Im z < v_{2}, say w. By compactness of C \ Ω, this set is contained in the interior of a circle of radius R centre w. The points w ± R lie in the intersection of Ω and the strip, which is open and connected. So they can be joined by a piecewise linear curve in the intersection. This curve and one of the semicircles between z + R and z − R give a Jordan curve enclosing w_{1} with w_{2} in its exterior. But then w_{1} and w_{2} lie on different connected components of C \ Ω. Finally the connected components of C \ Ω must be closed, so compact; and the connected compact subsets of a line parallel to the x axis are just isolated points or closed intervals.

Since G does not contain the infinity at ∞, the construction can equally be applied to e^{–i θ} G taking $\mathbb{C}$ with horizontal slits removed to give a uniformizer f_{θ}. The uniformizer e^{i θ} g_{θ}(e^{−iθ}z) now takes G to $\mathbb{C}$ with parallel slits removed at an angle of θ to the x-axis. In particular θ = π/2 leads to a uniformizer f_{π/2}(z) for $\mathbb{C}$ with vertical slits removed. By uniqueness f_{θ}(z) = e^{iθ} [cos θ f_{0}(z) − i sin θ f_{π/2}(z)].

== Classification of simply connected Riemann surfaces ==
Theorem. Any simply connected Riemann surface is conformally equivalent to either (1) the Riemann sphere (elliptic), (2) the complex plane (parabolic) or (3) the unit disk (hyperbolic).

Simple-connectedness of the extended sphere with k > 1 points or closed intervals removed can be excluded on purely topological reasons, using the Seifert-van Kampen theorem; for in this case the fundamental group is isomorphic to the free group with (k − 1) generators and its Abelianization, the singular homology group, is isomorphic to Z^{k − 1}. A short direct proof is also possible using complex function theory. The Riemann sphere is compact whereas the complex plane nor the unit dis are not, so there is not even homeomorphism for (1) onto (2) or (3). A conformal equivalence of (2) onto (3) would result in a bounded holomorphic function on the complex plane: by Liouville's theorem, it would have to be a constant, a contradiction. The "slit realisation" as the unit disk as the extended complex plane with [−1,1] removed comes from the mapping z = (w + w^{−1})/2. On the other hand the map (z + 1)/(z − 1) carries the extended plane with [−1,1] removed onto the complex plane with (−∞,0] removed. Taking the principal value of the square root gives a conformal mapping of the extended sphere with [−1,1] removed onto the upper half-plane. The Möbius transformation (t − 1)/(t + 1} carries the upper half-plane onto the unit disk. Composition of these mappings results in the conformal mapping z − (z^{2} -1)^{1/2}, thus solving z = (w + w^{−1})/2. To show that there can only be one interval closed, suppose reductio ad absurdum that there are at least two: they could just be single points. The two points a and b can be assumed to be on different intervals. There will then be a piecewise smooth closed curve C such b lies in the interior of X and a in the exterior. Let ω = dz(z - b)^{−1} − dz(z − a)^{−1}, a closed holomorphic form on X. By simple connectivity ∫_{C} ω = 0. On the other hand by Cauchy's integral formula, (2iπ)^{−1} ∫_{C} ω = 1, a contradiction.

Corollary (Riemann mapping theorem). Any connected and simply connected open domain in the complex plane with at least two boundary points is conformally equivalent to the unit disk.

This is an immediate consequence of the theorem.

== Applications ==
Koebe's uniformization theorem for planar Riemann surfaces implies the uniformization theorem for simply connected Riemann surface. Indeed, the slit domain is either the whole Riemann sphere; or the Riemann sphere less a point, so the complex plane after applying a Möbius transformation to move the point to infinity; or the Riemann sphere less a closed interval parallel to the real axis. After applying a Möbius transformation, the closed interval can be mapped to [–1,1]. It is therefore conformally equivalent to the unit disk, since the conformal mapping g(z) = (z + z^{−1})/2 maps the unit disk onto C \ [−1,1].

For a domain G obtained by excising $\mathbb{C}$ ∪ {∞} from finitely many disjoint closed disks, the conformal mapping onto a slit horizontal or vertical domains can be made explicit and presented in closed form. Thus the Poisson kernel on any of the disks can be used to solve the Dirichlet problem on the boundary of the disk as described in Katznelson (2004). Elementary properties such as the maximum principle and the Schwarz reflection principle apply as described in Ahlfors (1978). For a specific disk, the group of Möbius transformations stabilizing the boundary, a copy of SU(1,1), acts equivariantly on the corresponding Poisson kernel. For a fixed a in G, the Dirichlet problem with boundary value log |z − a| can be solved using the Poisson kernels. It yields a harmonic function h(z) on G. The difference g(z,a) = h(z) − log |z − a| is called the Green's function with pole at a. It has the important symmetry property that g(z,w) = g(w,z), so it is harmonic in both variables when it makes sense. Hence, if a = u + i v, the harmonic function ∂_{u} g(z,a) has harmonic conjugate − ∂_{v} g(z,a). On the other hand, by the Dirichlet problem, for each ∂D_{i} there is a unique harmonic function ω_{i} on G equal to 1 on ∂D_{i} and 0 on ∂D_{j} for j ≠ i (the so-called harmonic measure of ∂D_{i}). The ω_{i}'s sum to 1. The harmonic function ∂_{v} g(z,a) on D \ {a} is multi-valued: its argument changes by an integer multiple of 2π around each of the boundary disks D_{i}. The problem of multi-valuedness is resolved by choosing λ_{i}'s so that ∂_{v} g(z,a) + Σ λ_{i} ∂_{v} ω_{i}(z) has no change in argument around every ∂D_{j}. By construction the horizontal slit mapping p(z) = (∂_{u} + i ∂_{v}) [g(z,a) + Σ λ_{i} ω_{i}(z)] is holomorphic in G except at a where it has a pole with residue 1. Similarly the vertical slit mapping is obtained by setting q(z) = (− ∂_{v} + i ∂_{u}) [g(z,a) + Σ μ_{i} ω_{i}(z)]; the mapping q(z) is holomorphic except for a pole at a with residue 1.

Koebe's theorem also implies that every finitely connected bounded region in the plane is conformally equivalent to the open unit disk with finitely many smaller disjoint closed disks removed, or equivalently the extended complex plane with finitely many disjoint closed disks removed. This result is known as Koebe's "Kreisnormierungs" theorem.

Following Goluzin (1969) it can be deduced from the parallel slit theorem using a variant of Carathéodory's kernel theorem and Brouwer's theorem on invariance of domain. Goluzin's method is a simplification of Koebe's original argument.

In fact every conformal mapping of such a circular domain onto another circular domain is necessarily given by a Möbius transformation. To see this, it can be assumed that both domains contain the point ∞ and that the conformal mapping f carries ∞ onto ∞. The mapping functions can be continued continuously to the boundary circles. Successive inversions in these boundary circles generate Schottky groups. The union of the domains under the action of both Schottky groups define dense open subsets of the Riemann sphere. By the Schwarz reflection principle, f can be extended to a conformal map between these open dense sets. Their complements are the limit sets of the Schottky groups. They are compact and have measure zero. The Koebe distortion theorem can then be used to prove that f extends continuously to a conformal map of the Riemann sphere onto itself. Consequently, f is given by a Möbius transformation.

Now the space of circular domains with n circles has dimension 3n – 2 (fixing a point on one circle) as does the space of parallel slit domains with n parallel slits (fixing an endpoint point on a slit). Both spaces are path connected. The parallel slit theorem gives a map from one space to the other. It is one-one because conformal maps between circular domains are given by Möbius transformations. It is continuous by the convergence theorem for kernels. By invariance of domain, the map carries open sets onto open sets. The convergence theorem for kernels can be applied to the inverse of the map: it proves that if a sequence of slit domains is realisable by circular domains and the slit domains tend to a slit domain, then the corresponding sequence of circular domains converges to a circular domain; moreover the associated conformal mappings also converge. So the map must be onto by path connectedness of the target space.

An account of Koebe's original proof of uniformization by circular domains can be found in Bieberbach (1953). Uniformization can also be proved using the Beltrami equation. Schiffer & Hawley (1962) constructed the conformal mapping to a circular domain by minimizing a nonlinear functional—a method that generalized the Dirichlet principle.

Koebe also described two iterative schemes for constructing the conformal mapping onto a circular domain; these are described in Gaier (1964) and Henrici (1986) (rediscovered by engineers in aeronautics, Halsey (1979), they are highly efficient). In fact suppose a region on the Riemann sphere is given by the exterior of n disjoint Jordan curves and that ∞ is an exterior point. Let f_{1} be the Riemann mapping sending the outside of the first curve onto the outside of the unit disk, fixing ∞. The Jordan curves are transformed by f_{1} to n new curves. Now do the same for the second curve to get f_{2} with another new set of n curves. Continue in this way until f_{n} has been defined. Then restart the process on the first of the new curves and continue. The curves gradually tend to fixed circles and for large N the map f_{N} approaches the identity; and the compositions f_{N} ∘ f_{N−1} ∘ ⋅⋅⋅ ∘ f_{2} ∘ f_{1} tend uniformly on compacta to the uniformizing map.

Uniformization by parallel slit domains and by circle domains were proved by variational principles via Richard Courant starting in 1910 and are described in Courant (1950).

Uniformization by parallel slit domains holds for arbitrary connected open domains in C; Koebe (1908) conjectured (Koebe's "Kreisnormierungsproblem") that a similar statement was true for uniformization by circular domains. He & Schramm (1993) proved Koebe's conjecture when the number of boundary components is countable; although proved for wide classes of domains, the conjecture remains open when the number of boundary components is uncountable. Koebe (1936) also considered the limiting case of osculating or tangential circles which has continued to be actively studied in the theory of circle packing.

== See also ==
- Carathéodory's theorem (conformal mapping)
- Jordan curve theorem
- Schoenflies problem
