= Hilbert's twenty-second problem =

On uniformization of analytic relations

Hilbert's twenty-second problem is the penultimate entry in the celebrated list of 23 Hilbert problems compiled in 1900 by David Hilbert. It entails the uniformization of analytic relations by means of automorphic functions.

== Problem statement ==
The entirety of the original problem statement is as follows:

As Poincaré was the first to prove, it is always possible to reduce any algebraic relation between two variables to uniformity by the use of automorphic functions of one variable. That is, if any algebraic equation in two variables be given, there can always be found for these variables two such single valued automorphic functions of a single variable that their substitution renders the given algebraic equation an identity. The generalization of this fundamental theorem to any analytic non-algebraic relations whatever between two variables has likewise been attempted with success by Poincaré, though by a way entirely different from that which served him in the special problem first mentioned. From Poincaré's proof of the possibility of reducing to uniformity an arbitrary analytic relation between two variables, however, it does not become apparent whether the resolving functions can be determined to meet certain additional conditions. Namely, it is not shown whether the two single valued functions of the one new variable can be so chosen that, while this variable traverses the regular domain of those functions, the totality of all regular points of the given analytic field are actually reached and represented. On the contrary it seems to be the case, from Poincaré's investigations, that there are beside the branch points certain others, in general infinitely many other discrete exceptional points of the analytic field, that can be reached only by making the new variable approach certain limiting points of the functions. In view of the fundamental importance of Poincaré's formulation of the question it seems to me that an elucidation and resolution of this difficulty is extremely desirable.

In conjunction with this problem comes up the problem of reducing to uniformity an algebraic or any other analytic relation among three or more complex variables—a problem which is known to be solvable in many particular cases. Toward the solution of this the recent investigations of Picard on algebraic functions of two variables are to be regarded as welcome and important preliminary studies.

== Partial solutions ==
Koebe proved the general uniformization theorem that if a Riemann surface is homeomorphic to an open subset of the complex sphere (or equivalently if every Jordan curve separates it), then it is conformally equivalent to an open subset of the complex sphere.

== Current status ==
This problem is currently open. Some progress has been made by Griffith and Bers.
