= Hilbert's problems =

23 mathematical problems stated in 1900

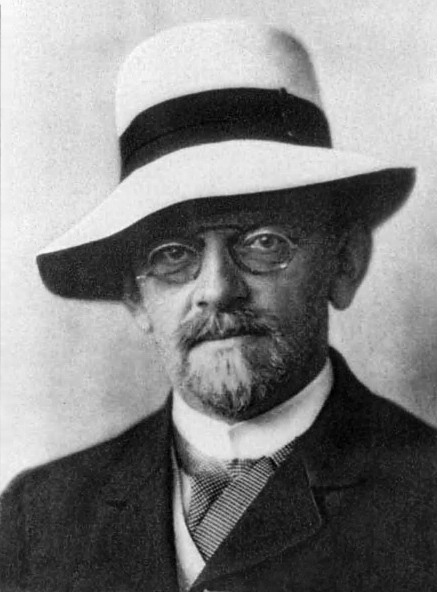
David Hilbert

Hilbert's problems are 23 problems in mathematics published by German mathematician David Hilbert in 1900. He intended to rival the master of French mathematics, Henri Poincaré, (Note: At the first International Congress of Mathematicians, held in Zurich in 1897, Henri Poincaré had been the star of the event with his lecture "On the relations between pure analysis and mathematical physics." This success had propelled him to the presidency of the organizing committee. Ref. Carlos M. Madrid Casado and Anne Postel (Trans.), In Search of Universal Axioms: Hilbert, p. 50.) and to prove that he was cut from the same cloth. They were all unsolved at the time, and several proved to be very influential for 20th-century mathematics. Hilbert presented ten of the problems (1, 2, 6, 7, 8, 13, 16, 19, 21, and 22) at the Paris conference of the International Congress of Mathematicians, speaking on August 8 at the Sorbonne. The complete list of 23 problems was published later, and translated into English in 1902 by Mary Frances Winston Newson in the Bulletin of the American Mathematical Society. Earlier publications (in the original German) appeared in Archiv der Mathematik und Physik.

Of the cleanly formulated Hilbert problems: 3, 6a (Note: Some problems are rather lists of related elementary problems, but this subdivision is specific to this website and not official.), 7, 10, 11, 14, 17, 18, 19, and 21 have resolutions that are accepted by consensus of the mathematical community. The status of problems 1, 2, 5, 6b, 8c, 13, and 15 is controversial: there are some results, but there exists some controversy as to whether they resolve the problems. Problems 8a, 8b, 9, 12, 16, 20 and 22 are unresolved or widely agreed as unresolved despite some partial results. Problems 4 and 23 are considered as too vague to ever be described as solved; the withdrawn 24 would also be in this class.

== List of Hilbert's problems ==
The following are the headers for Hilbert's 23 problems as they appeared in the 1902 translation of Hilbert's presentation, published in the Bulletin of the American Mathematical Society.

1. Cantor's problem of the cardinal number of the continuum
2. The compatibility of the arithmetical axioms
3. Scissor congruence of polyhedra of equal volumes
4. Problem of the straight line as the shortest distance between two points.
5. Lie's concept of a continuous group of transformations without the assumption of the differentiability of the functions defining the group
6. Mathematical treatment of the axioms of physics
7. Irrationality and transcendence of certain numbers
8. Problems of prime numbers
9. Proof of the most general law of reciprocity in any number field
10. Determination of the solvability of a Diophantine equation
11. Quadratic forms with any algebraic numerical coefficients
12. Extensions of the Kronecker–Weber theorem on Abelian fields to any algebraic realm of rationality
13. Impossibility of the solution of the general equation of 7th degree by means of functions of only two arguments
14. Proof of the finiteness of certain complete systems of functions
15. Rigorous foundation of Schubert's enumerative calculus
16. Problem of the topology of algebraic curves and surfaces
17. Expression of definite forms by squares
18. Building up of space from congruent polyhedra
19. Are the solutions of regular problems in the calculus of variations always necessarily analytic?
20. The general problem of boundary values
21. Proof of the existence of linear differential equations having a prescribed monodromy group
22. Uniformization of analytic relations by means of automorphic functions
23. Further development of the methods of the calculus of variations

=== The 24th problem ===
Hilbert originally had 24 problems on his list, but decided against including one of them in the published list. The "24th problem" (in proof theory, on a criterion for simplicity and general methods) was rediscovered in Hilbert's original manuscript notes by German historian Rüdiger Thiele in 2000.

== Table of problems and statuses ==
Hilbert's 23 problems, and the unpublished 24th problem, are listed below. For details on the solutions and references, see the articles that are linked to in the first column.

Problem	Brief explanation	Status	Year solved
1st	The continuum hypothesis: there is no set whose cardinality is strictly between that of the integers and that of the real numbers.	The results of Kurt Gödel and Paul Cohen demonstrate that the hypothesis is impossible to prove or disprove within Zermelo–Fraenkel set theory (with or without the axiom of choice and provided Zermelo–Fraenkel theory itself is consistent), which is commonly accepted as a foundation of modern mathematics. There is no consensus on whether this is a solution to the problem. There exist extensions of Zermelo-Fraenkel axiomatics where the continuum hypothesis is true as well as extensions where it is false.	1940, 1963?
2nd	Prove that the axioms of arithmetic are consistent.	There is no consensus on whether the results of Gödel and Gentzen give a solution to the problem as stated by Hilbert. Gödel's second incompleteness theorem, proven in 1931, shows that no such proof can be carried out within arithmetic itself. Moreover, any other theory that is strong enough to prove the consistency of arithmetic cannot prove its own consistency. Gentzen proved in 1936 that the consistency of arithmetic follows from the well-foundedness of the ordinal ε_{0}.	1931, 1936?
3rd	Given any two polyhedra of equal volume, is it always possible to cut the first into finitely many polyhedral pieces that can be reassembled to yield the second?	Resolved. Result: No, proven by Max Dehn using Dehn invariants. Even different Platonic solids of equal volume cannot be obtained this way from each other.	1900
4th	Construction of geometries satisfying axioms of classical geometry, where lines are geodesics.	Too vague to be stated resolved or not. (Note: According to Gray, most of the problems have been solved. Some were not defined completely, but enough progress has been made to consider them "solved"; Gray lists the fourth problem as too vague to say whether it has been solved.)	—N/a
5th	Are continuous groups automatically differential groups?	Depends on the interpretation of "continuous group". If the term is understood as a topological group that is also a topological manifold: yes, proven by Andrew Gleason. If "continuous group" is understood as a topological group acting on a manifold, the problem becomes the Hilbert–Smith conjecture, which is still unresolved.	1953?
6th	Mathematical treatment of the axioms of physics. In a later explanation given by Hilbert: (a) axiomatic treatment of probability with limit theorems for foundation of statistical physics (b) the rigorous theory of limiting processes "which lead from the atomistic view to the laws of motion of continua"	(a) Resolved. The Kolmogorov axioms are accepted as the foundation of probability theory.	1933
6th	Mathematical treatment of the axioms of physics. In a later explanation given by Hilbert: (a) axiomatic treatment of probability with limit theorems for foundation of statistical physics (b) the rigorous theory of limiting processes "which lead from the atomistic view to the laws of motion of continua"	(b) Depends on the interpretation of the problem. If treated as a physical problem: since the publication of Hilbert's list, new discoveries challenged classical mechanics and led to the formulation of quantum field theory, which holds an "atomistic view" of physical laws; and general relativity, which describes "motion of continua" at large scales. Despite many attempts to unify them into a theory of everything, it is still not obvious how to make clear link between them. Some authors tried to solve this as a mathematical problem in a classical mechanics framework, which was the dominant physical theory during the publication of the list. In March 2025, Deng, Hani, and Ma published a paper claiming to have solved this problem by deriving continuous fluid equations and Boltzmann equations from Newton's laws applied for particles. The paper is currently in peer review.	2025?
7th	Is a^{b} transcendental, for algebraic a ≠ 0,1 and irrational algebraic b ?	Resolved. Result: Yes, illustrated by the Gelfond–Schneider theorem.	1934
8th	(a) The Riemann hypothesis: the real part of any non-trivial zero of the Riemann zeta function is 1/2.	Partial results include much weaker estimations that almost all nontrivial zeroes have real part arbitrarily close to 1/2, and at least 5/12 of non-trivial zeros have real part equal to 1/2. In November 2026, Levent Alpöge posted a claimed proof of the generalized Riemann hypothesis formalized in Lean. The Lean community has put out a statement stating that they have "full confidence" that Alpöge's proof [...] is correct".	2026?
8th	(b) For pairwise coprime integers: $a, b,c$ determine solvability of diophantine equation: $ax+by+c=0$ for x and y being prime numbers. Goldbach's conjecture and the twin prime conjecture are special cases of this problem.	Unresolved, even the special cases of this equation are hard open problems. Partial results include Yitang Zhang's proof of bounded gaps between primes, later improved by the Polymath Project.	—N/a
8th	(c) Generalize results using Riemann zeta function for distribution of prime numbers in integers, to apply them to Dedekind zeta functions for distribution of prime ideals in ring of integers for any number field.	Depends on the interpretation of expected results. In 1917, Erich Hecke constructed an analytic continuation for Dedekind zeta functions and proved functional equation, which allowed for obtaining results similar to that currently accessible using Riemann zeta function. However, if understood as proving an extended Riemann hypothesis, then the problem is still unresolved.	1917?
9th	Find the most general reciprocity law in any number field.	Unresolved. Partial results include the Artin reciprocity law for abelian extensions of number fields, key result in class field theory. Development of non-abelian class field theory that would work for the general case of number fields is still a largely conjectural area.	—N/a
10th	Find an algorithm to determine whether a given polynomial Diophantine equation with integer coefficients has an integer solution.	Resolved. Result: Impossible; Matiyasevich's theorem implies that there is no such algorithm.	1970
11th	Develop the theory of quadratic forms with any number of variables and coefficients over any number field, especially resolving quadratic equations by elements of this field and its ring of integers.	Resolved. Helmut Hasse in 1924 created a general theory of classification and deciding solvability of quadratic forms over number fields using the local-global principle. His theory was later extended and simplified in 1937 by Ernst Witt using Witt rings.	1924, 1937
12th	Extend the Kronecker–Weber theorem on abelian extensions of the rational numbers to abelian extensions of any base number field.	Unresolved. Partial results include construction using Hilbert modular forms for CM-fields by Goro Shimura and special cases of totally real fields using Brumer-Stark units by Dasgupta and Kadke.	—N/a
13th	Prove that the general case of septic equation cannot be solved using finite composition of continuous functions (variant: algebraic functions) of two parameters. For continuous variant: at least construct analytic function of three variables that cannot be represented as such composition.	Depends on the variant of the problem. For the continuous variant: No; the Kolmogorov–Arnold representation theorem shows that every multivariate continuous function can be obtained through such composition. Some authors argue that Hilbert intended for a solution within the space of algebraic functions and possible extension of the Galois theory, thus continuing their own work on the algebraic case. It appears from one of later Hilbert's papers that this was his original intention for the problem. For the algebraic variant, the problem is unresolved.	1957?
14th	If $k$ is a field and $K$ is a subfield of $k(x_1,\ldots,x_n)$ containing $k$, is $K\cap k[x_1,\ldots,x_n]$ always finitely generated over $k$?	Resolved. Result: No, the conjecture is false for $n, r\geq 3$ where $r$ denotes the transcendence degree of $K$ over $k$. For $r \leq2$ and consequently $n \leq2$, Oscar Zariski proved an affirmative answer in 1954. Masayoshi Nagata constructed the first counterexamples for $n=32$ and $r=19, 4$ in 1958. Following Nagata's work, other mathematicians constructed counterexamples to lower both the number of variables and the transcendence degree. In 2005 Shigeru Kuroda constructed a counterexample with $n=r=3$, showing that both bounds are sharp.	1954, 1958-2005
15th	Rigorous foundation of Schubert's enumerative calculus.	Significant developments for resolving this problem have been made since the publication of the list: Major enumerative examples of Schubert have been verified by Aluffi, Harris, Kleiman, Xambó, et al.; Special presentations of the Chow rings of flag manifolds have been worked out by Borel, Marlin, Billey-Haiman and Duan-Zhao, et al.; Schubert's characteristic problem has been solved by Haibao Duan and Xuezhi Zhao.; Duan and Zhao claimed that their result actually resolved this problem. Currently there is no consensus whether the problem is resolved completely or partially.	1987–2020?
16th	Describe relative positions of ovals originating from a real algebraic curve and as limit cycles of a polynomial vector field on the plane.	Unresolved. Exact description of position of components for real algebraic curves is an open problem, even for small degrees like 8. For polynomial vector fields, partial results include proof that they have finitely many limit cycles, but no effective bound is known.	—N/a
17th	Express a nonnegative rational function as quotient of sums of squares.	Resolved. Result: Yes, due to Emil Artin. Moreover, an upper limit was established for the number of square terms necessary.	1927
18th	(a) Are there only finitely many essentially different space groups in n-dimensional Euclidean space?	Resolved. Result: Yes (by Ludwig Bieberbach)	1910
18th	(b) Is there a polyhedron that admits only an anisohedral tiling in three dimensions?	Resolved. Result: Yes (by Karl Reinhardt).	1928
18th	(c) What is the densest sphere packing?	Resolved, by computer-assisted proof (by Thomas Callister Hales) and later with a machine-verified proof in project flyspeck. Result: Highest density achieved by close packings, each with density approximately 74%, such as face-centered cubic close packing and hexagonal close packing.	1998
19th	Are the solutions of regular problems in the calculus of variations always necessarily analytic?	Resolved. Result: Yes, proven by Ennio De Giorgi and, independently and using different methods, by John Forbes Nash.	1957
20th	Do all variational problems with certain boundary conditions have solutions?	Unresolved. A significant topic of research throughout the 20th century, resulting in solutions for some cases.	—N/a
21st	Proof of the existence of Fuchsian linear differential equations with given singular points and a prescribed monodromy group	Resolved; the answer depends on the formulation. For systems with regular singularities, the answer is yes, as proved by Josip Plemelj in 1908. For the stricter formulation requiring a Fuchsian system, the answer is no in general; Andrei Bolibrukh gave a counterexample in 1989.	1908, 1989
22nd	Uniformization of analytic relations by means of automorphic functions	Unresolved. Partial results include the uniformization theorem for Riemann surfaces.	—N/a
23rd	Further development of the calculus of variations	Too vague to be stated resolved or not. Since the list was proposed, Hilbert and many other mathematicians have made numerous contributions to the calculus of variations. The dynamic programming of Richard Bellman is considered an alternative to the calculus of variations. (Note: See Harold J. Kushner (2004): regarding Dynamic Programming, "The calculus of variations had related ideas (e.g., the work of Caratheodory, the Hamilton-Jacobi equation). This led to conflicts with the calculus of variations community.")	—N/a
Unpublished 24th problem
24th	Development of a theory of proof simplicity	Recovered from Hilbert's unpublished notes. Too vague to be stated resolved or not.	—N/a

== Nature and influence of the problems ==
Hilbert's problems ranged greatly in topic and precision. Some of them, like the 3rd problem, which was the first to be solved, or the 8th problem (the Riemann hypothesis), which still remains unresolved, were presented precisely enough to enable a clear affirmative or negative answer. For other problems, such as the 5th, experts have traditionally agreed on a single interpretation, and a solution to the accepted interpretation has been given, but closely related unsolved problems exist. Some of Hilbert's statements were not precise enough to specify a particular problem, but were suggestive enough that certain problems of contemporary nature seem to apply; for example, most modern number theorists would probably see the 9th problem as referring to the conjectural Langlands correspondence on representations of the absolute Galois group of a number field. Still other problems, such as the 11th and the 16th, concern flourishing mathematical subdisciplines, like the theories of quadratic forms and real algebraic curves.

There are two problems that are not only unresolved but may in fact be unresolvable by modern standards. The 6th problem concerns the axiomatization of physics, a goal that 20th-century developments seem to render both more remote and less important than in Hilbert's time. Also, the 4th problem concerns the foundations of geometry, in a manner that is generally judged to be too vague to enable a definitive answer.

The 23rd problem was purposefully set as a general indication by Hilbert to highlight the calculus of variations as an underappreciated and understudied field. In the lecture introducing these problems, Hilbert made the following introductory remark to the 23rd problem:

"So far, I have generally mentioned problems as definite and special as possible, in the opinion that it is just such definite and special problems that attract us the most and from which the most lasting influence is often exerted upon science. Nevertheless, I should like to close with a general problem, namely with the indication of a branch of mathematics repeatedly mentioned in this lecture—which, in spite of the considerable advancement lately given it by Weierstrass, does not receive the general appreciation which, in my opinion, is its due—I mean the calculus of variations."

The other 20 problems have all received significant attention, and late into the 20th century work on these problems was still considered to be of the greatest importance. Paul Cohen received the Fields Medal in 1966 for his work on the first problem, and the negative solution of the tenth problem in 1970 by Yuri Matiyasevich (completing work by Julia Robinson, Hilary Putnam, and Martin Davis) generated similar acclaim. Aspects of these problems remain of great interest.

== Knowability ==
Following Gottlob Frege and Bertrand Russell, Hilbert sought to define mathematics logically using the method of formal systems, i.e., finitistic proofs from an agreed-upon set of axioms. One of the main goals of Hilbert's program was a finitistic proof of the consistency of the axioms of arithmetic: that is his second problem. (Note: See Nagel and Newman revised by Hofstadter (2001, p. 107), footnote 37: "Moreover, although most specialists in mathematical logic do not question the cogency of [Gentzen's] proof, it is not finitistic in the sense of Hilbert's original stipulations for an absolute proof of consistency." Also see next page: "But these proofs [Gentzen's et al.] cannot be mirrored inside the systems that they concern, and, since they are not finitistic, they do not achieve the proclaimed objectives of Hilbert's original program." Hofstadter rewrote the original (1958) footnote slightly, changing the word "students" to "specialists in mathematical logic". And this point is discussed again on page 109 and was not modified there by Hofstadter (p. 108).)

However, Gödel's second incompleteness theorem gives a precise sense in which such a finitistic proof of the consistency of arithmetic is provably impossible. Hilbert lived for 12 years after Kurt Gödel published his theorem, but does not seem to have written any formal response to Gödel's work. (Note: Reid reports that upon hearing about "Gödel's work from Bernays, he was 'somewhat angry'. ... At first he was only angry and frustrated, but then he began to try to deal constructively with the problem. ... It was not yet clear just what influence Gödel's work would ultimately have" (p. 198–199). Reid notes that in two papers in 1931 Hilbert proposed a different form of induction called "unendliche Induktion" (p. 199).) (Note: Reid's biography of Hilbert, written during the 1960s from interviews and letters, reports that "Godel (who never had any correspondence with Hilbert) feels that Hilbert's scheme for the foundations of mathematics 'remains highly interesting and important in spite of my negative results' (p. 217). Observe the use of present tense – she reports that Gödel and Bernays among others "answered my questions about Hilbert's work in logic and foundations" (p. vii).)

Hilbert's tenth problem does not ask whether there exists an algorithm for deciding the solvability of Diophantine equations, but rather asks for the construction of such an algorithm: "to devise a process according to which it can be determined in a finite number of operations whether the equation is solvable in rational integers". That this problem was solved by showing that there cannot be any such algorithm contradicted a Hilbert's philosophical guess.

In discussing his opinion that every mathematical problem should have a solution, Hilbert allows for the possibility that the solution could be a proof that the original problem is impossible. (Note: This issue that finds its beginnings in the "foundational crisis" of the early 20th century, in particular the controversy about under what circumstances could the Law of Excluded Middle be employed in proofs. See much more at Brouwer–Hilbert controversy.) He stated that the point is to know one way or the other what the solution is, and he believed that we always can know this, that in mathematics there is not any "ignorabimus" (statement whose truth can never be known). (Note: "This conviction of the solvability of every mathematical problem is a powerful incentive to the worker. We hear within us the perpetual call: There is the problem. Seek its solution. You can find it by pure reason, for in mathematics there is no ignorabimus." (Hilbert, 1902, p. 445)) It seems unclear whether he would have regarded the solution of the tenth problem as an instance of ignorabimus.

On the other hand, the status of the first and second problems is even more complicated: there is no clear mathematical consensus as to whether the results of Gödel (in the case of the second problem), or Gödel and Cohen (in the case of the first problem) give definitive negative solutions or not, since these solutions apply to a certain formalization of the problems, which is not necessarily the only possible one. (Note: Nagel, Newman and Hofstadter discuss this issue: "The possibility of constructing a finitistic absolute proof of consistency for a formal system such as Principia Mathematica is not excluded by Gödel's results. ... His argument does not eliminate the possibility ... But no one today appears to have a clear idea of what a finitistic proof would be like that is not capable of being mirrored inside Principia Mathematica (footnote 39, page 109). The authors conclude that the prospect "is most unlikely".)

== Follow-ups ==
Mathematicians and mathematical organizations have announced numerous problem lists which have, with few exceptions, failed to generate nearly as much influence or work as Hilbert's problems. Notable examples include the Weil conjectures, Paul Erdős's problems, Thurston's 24 questions, and Smale's problems.

The four Weil Conjectures, made by André Weil in the late 1940s, are important to the fields of algebraic geometry and number theory. The first conjecture was proven by Bernard Dwork; a different proof of the first two, via ℓ-adic cohomology, was given by Alexander Grothendieck. The last and deepest of the Weil conjectures, an analogue of the Riemann hypothesis, was proven by Pierre Deligne. Both Grothendieck and Deligne were awarded the Fields Medal. However, the Weil conjectures were more like a single Hilbert problem in scope, and Weil never intended them as a programme for all mathematics.

Erdős posed hundreds, possibly thousands, of problems, often offering monetary rewards; the size of the reward depended on the perceived difficulty of the problem.

William Thurston published a list of 24 mathematical problems in a 1982 paper, but Thurston's list was focused on problems from geometric topology of 3-dimensional manifolds, unlike Hilbert's list that covered many different branches of mathematics, Also unlike Hilbert's problems, many of which took decades to resolve or are still open, 22 of 24 Thurston's problems were resolved in 30 years after publication.

Several mathematicians proposed problem lists at the turn of the millennium, such as Fields Medalist Steve Smale who responded to a request by Vladimir Arnold to propose a list of 18 problems.

At least in the mainstream media, the de facto 21st century analogue of Hilbert's problems is the list of seven Millennium Prize Problems chosen during 2000 by the Clay Mathematics Institute. Unlike the Hilbert problems, where the primary award was the admiration of Hilbert in particular and mathematicians in general, each prize problem includes a million-dollar bounty. While most of Hilbert's problems were not recognised widely in mathematical community before publication of his list, all of Millennium Prize Problem was well-known from decades and earned many attempted proofs. As with the Hilbert problems, one of the prize problems (the Poincaré conjecture) was solved relatively soon after the problems were announced.

The Riemann hypothesis is noteworthy for its appearance on the list of Hilbert problems, Smale's list, the Millennium Prize Problems, and the Weil conjectures in its geometric setting. Despite extensive efforts by mathematicians throughout the 20th and 21st centuries, the conjecture remains unproven. Reflecting on its enduring difficulty, Hilbert remarked: "If I were to awaken after having slept for a thousand years, my first question would be: Has the Riemann hypothesis been proved?"

In 2008, DARPA announced its own list of 23 problems that it hoped could lead to major mathematical breakthroughs, "thereby strengthening the scientific and technological capabilities of the DoD". The DARPA list also includes a few problems from Hilbert's list, e.g. the Riemann hypothesis.

== See also ==
- Landau's problems
- Millennium Prize Problems
- Smale's problems
- Taniyama's problems
- Thurston's 24 questions
