= List of geometric topology topics =

This is a list of geometric topology topics.

== Low-dimensional topology ==
=== Knot theory ===
- Knot (mathematics)
- Link (knot theory)
- Wild knots
- Examples of knots (and links)
  - Unknot
  - Trefoil knot
  - Figure-eight knot (mathematics)
  - Borromean rings
- Types of knots (and links)
  - Torus knot
  - Prime knot
  - Alternating knot
  - Hyperbolic link
- Knot invariants
  - Crossing number
  - Linking number
  - Skein relation
  - Knot polynomials
    - Alexander polynomial
    - Jones polynomial
  - Knot group
- Writhe
- Quandle
- Seifert surface
- Braids
  - Braid theory
  - Braid group
- Kirby calculus

=== Surfaces ===
- Genus (mathematics)
- Examples
  - Positive Euler characteristic
    - 2-disk
    - Sphere
    - Real projective plane
  - Zero Euler characteristic
    - Annulus
    - Möbius strip
    - Torus
    - Klein bottle
  - Negative Euler characteristic
    - The boundary of the pretzel is a genus three surface
  - Embedded/Immersed in Euclidean space
    - Cross-cap
    - Boy's surface
    - Roman surface
    - Steiner surface
    - Alexander horned sphere
    - Klein bottle
- Mapping class group
  - Dehn twist
  - Nielsen–Thurston classification

=== Three-manifolds ===
- Moise's Theorem (see also Hauptvermutung)
- Poincaré conjecture
  - Thurston elliptization conjecture
- Thurston's geometrization conjecture
  - Hyperbolic 3-manifolds
  - Spherical 3-manifolds
  - Euclidean 3-manifolds, Bieberbach Theorem, Flat manifolds, Crystallographic groups
  - Seifert fiber space
- Heegaard splitting
  - Waldhausen conjecture
  - Compression body
  - Handlebody
- Incompressible surface
  - Dehn's lemma
  - Loop theorem (aka the Disk theorem)
  - Sphere theorem
- Haken manifold
- JSJ decomposition
- Branched surface
- Lamination
- Examples
  - 3-sphere
  - Torus bundles
  - Surface bundles over the circle
  - Graph manifolds
  - Knot complements
  - Whitehead manifold
- Invariants
  - Fundamental group
  - Heegaard genus
  - tri-genus
  - Analytic torsion

== Manifolds in general ==
- Orientable manifold
- Connected sum
- Jordan-Schönflies theorem
- Signature (topology)
- Handle decomposition
- Handlebody
- h-cobordism theorem
- s-cobordism theorem
- Manifold decomposition
- Hilbert–Smith conjecture
- Mapping class group
- Orbifolds
- Examples
  - Exotic sphere
  - Homology sphere
  - Lens space
  - I-bundle

== See also ==
- topology glossary
- List of topology topics
- List of general topology topics
- List of algebraic topology topics
- Publications in topology
