= Introduction to 3-Manifolds =

Mathematics textbook

- First edition
- Author: Jennifer Schultens
- Language: English
- Series: Graduate Studies in Mathematics
- Release number: 151
- Subject: Low-dimensional topology
- Genre: Mathematics
- Publisher: American Mathematical Society
- Publication date: 2014
- Publication place: United States

Introduction to 3-Manifolds is a mathematics book on low-dimensional topology. It was written by Jennifer Schultens and published by the American Mathematical Society in 2014 as volume 151 of their book series Graduate Studies in Mathematics.

== Topics ==
A manifold is a space whose topology, near any of its points, is the same as the topology near a point of a Euclidean space; however, its global structure may be non-Euclidean. Familiar examples of two-dimensional manifolds include the sphere, torus, and Klein bottle; this book concentrates on three-dimensional manifolds, and on two-dimensional surfaces within them. A particular focus is a Heegaard splitting, a two-dimensional surface that partitions a 3-manifold into two handlebodies. It aims to present the main ideas of this area, but does not include detailed proofs for many of the results that it states, in many cases because these proofs are long and technical.

The book has seven chapters. The first two are introductory, providing material about manifolds in general, the Hauptvermutung proving the existence and equivalence of triangulations for low-dimensional manifolds, the classification of two-dimensional surfaces, covering spaces, and the mapping class group. The third chapter begins the book's material on 3-manifolds, and on the decomposition of manifolds into smaller spaces by cutting them along surfaces. For instance, the three-dimensional Schoenflies theorem states that cutting Euclidean space by a sphere can only produce two topological balls; an analogous theorem of J. W. Alexander states that at least one side of any torus in Euclidean space must be a solid torus. However, for more complicated manifolds, cutting along incompressible surfaces can be used to construct the JSJ decomposition of a manifold. This chapter also includes material on Seifert fiber spaces. Chapter four concerns knot theory, knot invariants, thin position, and the relation between knots and their invariants to manifolds via knot complements, the subspaces of Euclidean space on the other sides of tori.

Reviewer Bruno Zimmermann calls chapters 5 and 6 "the heart of the book", although reviewer Michael Berg disagrees, viewing chapter 4 on knot theory as more central. Chapter 5 discusses normal surfaces, surfaces that intersect the tetrahedra of a triangulation of a manifold in a controlled way. By parameterizing these surfaces by how many pieces of each possible type they can have within each tetrahedron of a triangulation, one can reduce many questions about manifolds such as the recognition of trivial knots and trivial manifolds to questions in number theory, on the existence of solutions to certain Diophantine equations. The book uses this tool to prove the existence and uniqueness of prime decompositions of manifolds. Chapter 6 concerns Heegaard splittings, surfaces which split a given manifold into two handlebodies. It includes the theorem of Reidemeister and Singer on common refinements ("stabilizations") of Heegaard splittings, the reducibility of splittings, the uniqueness of splittings of a given genus for Euclidean space, and the Rubinstein–Scharlemann graphic, a tool for studying Heegaard splittings.

A final chapter surveys more advanced topics including the geometrization conjecture, Dehn surgery, foliations, laminations, and curve complexes. There are two appendices, on general position and Morse theory.

== Audience and reception ==
Although written in the form of an introductory-level graduate textbook, this book presents many recent developments, making it also of interest to specialists in this area. A small amount of background in general topology is needed, and additional familiarity with algebraic topology and differential geometry could be helpful in reading the book. Many illustrations and exercises are included.

Reviewer Bruno Zimmermann states that the book "is written in a nice and intuitive way which makes it pleasant to read". Reviewer Michael Berg calls it "an excellent book that richly illustrates the scope of her chosen subject ... very well written, clear and explicit in its presentation".

== Related reading ==
Other related books on the mathematics of 3-manifolds include 3-manifolds by John Hempel (1976), Knots, links, braids and 3-manifolds by Victor V. Prasolov and Alexei B. Sosinskiĭ (1997), Algorithmic topology and classification of 3-manifolds by Sergey V. Matveev (2nd ed., 2007), and a collection of unpublished lecture notes on 3-manifolds by Allen Hatcher.
