= Jennifer Schultens =

American mathematician

Jennifer Carol Schultens (born 1965) is an American mathematician specializing in low-dimensional topology and knot theory. She is a professor of mathematics at the University of California, Davis.

== Education ==
Schultens earned her Ph.D. in 1993 at the University of California, Santa Barbara. Her dissertation, Classification of Heegaard Splittings for Some Seifert Manifolds, was supervised by Martin Scharlemann.

== Research ==
Schultens is the author of the book Introduction to 3-Manifolds (Graduate Studies in Mathematics, 2014). With Martin Scharlemann and Toshio Saito, she is a co-author of Lecture Notes On Generalized Heegaard Splittings (World Scientific, 2016).

Her dissertation research involved the classification of Heegaard splittings of three-dimensional manifolds into handlebodies, which she also published in the Proceedings of the London Mathematical Society. Other topics in her research include the behavior of knot invariants like bridge number when knots are combined by the connected sum operation, and the Kakimizu complexes of knot complements and other spaces.

== Personal ==
Schultens was married to mathematician Michael Kapovich who died in 2026.
