= Kapovich =

Kapovich (Russian: Капович) is a Jewish surname. Notable people with the surname include:

- Ilya Kapovich, Russian-American mathematician
- Katia Kapovich (born 1960), Russian-American poet
- Michael Kapovich (born 1963), Russian-American mathematician
