= Handle decompositions of 3-manifolds =

In mathematics, a handle decomposition of a 3-manifold allows simplification of the original 3-manifold into pieces which are easier to study.

== Heegaard splittings ==
An important method used to decompose into handlebodies is the Heegaard splitting, which gives a decomposition in two handlebodies of equal genus.

== Examples ==
As an example: lens spaces are orientable 3-spaces and allow decomposition into two solid tori, which are genus-one-handlebodies. The genus one non-orientable space is a space which is the union of two solid Klein bottles and corresponds to the twisted product of the 2-sphere and the 1-sphere: $\scriptstyle S^2\tilde{\times}S^1$.

== Orientability ==
Each orientable 3-manifold is the union of exactly two orientable handlebodies; meanwhile, each non-orientable one needs three orientable handlebodies.

== Heegaard genus ==
The minimal genus of the glueing boundary determines what is known as the Heegaard genus. For non-orientable spaces an interesting invariant is the tri-genus.
