= Compression body =

In the theory of 3-manifolds, a compression body is a kind of generalized handlebody.

A compression body is either a handlebody or the result of the following construction:

Let $S$ be a compact, closed surface (not necessarily connected). Attach 1-handles to $S \times [0,1]$ along $S \times \{1\}$.

Let $C$ be a compression body. The negative boundary of C, denoted $\partial_{-}C$, is $S \times \{0\}$. (If $C$ is a handlebody then $\partial_- C = \emptyset$.) The positive boundary of C, denoted $\partial_{+}C$, is $\partial C$ minus the negative boundary.

There is a dual construction of compression bodies starting with a surface $S$ and attaching 2-handles to $S \times \{0\}$. In this case $\partial_{+}C$ is $S \times \{1\}$, and $\partial_{-}C$ is $\partial C$ minus the positive boundary.

Compression bodies often arise when manipulating Heegaard splittings.
