= Lamination (disambiguation) =

Lamination is a manufacturing process where a material is built up with multiple layers, from the same or different materials.

Lamination may also refer to:

- Lamination (topology), a partition of a closed subset of the surface into smooth curves.
- Lamination (geology), a small-scale sequence of fine layers (laminae; singular: lamina) that occurs in sedimentary rocks
- Lamination (food), a method of preparing dough by separating layers of it with butter.
- Laminator, a specific type of device used to laminate paper or card stock
