= Manifold decomposition =

In topology, a branch of mathematics, a manifold M may be decomposed or split by writing M as a combination of smaller pieces. When doing so, one must specify both what those pieces are and how they are put together to form M.

Manifold decomposition works in two directions: one can start with the smaller pieces and build up a manifold, or start with a large manifold and decompose it. The latter has proven a very useful way to study manifolds: without tools like decomposition, it is sometimes very hard to understand a manifold. In particular, it has been useful in attempts to classify 3-manifolds and also in proving the higher-dimensional Poincaré conjecture.

The table below is a summary of the various manifold-decomposition techniques. The column labeled "M" indicates what kind of manifold can be decomposed; the column labeled "How it is decomposed" indicates how, starting with a manifold, one can decompose it into smaller pieces; the column labeled "The pieces" indicates what the pieces can be; and the column labeled "How they are combined" indicates how the smaller pieces are combined to make the large manifold.

Type of decomposition	M	How it is decomposed	The pieces	How they are combined
Triangulation	Depends on dimension. In dimension 3, a theorem by Edwin E. Moise gives that every 3-manifold has a unique triangulation, unique up to common subdivision. In dimension 4, not all manifolds are triangulable. For higher dimensions, general existence of triangulations is unknown.		Simplices	Glue together pairs of codimension-one faces
Jaco-Shalen/Johannson torus decomposition	Irreducible, orientable, compact 3-manifolds	Cut along embedded tori	Atoroidal or Seifert-fibered 3-manifolds	Union along their boundary, using the trivial homeomorphism
Prime decomposition	Essentially surfaces and 3-manifolds. The decomposition is unique when the manifold is orientable.	Cut along embedded spheres; then union by the trivial homeomorphism along the resultant boundaries with disjoint balls.	Prime manifolds	Connected sum
Heegaard splitting	Closed, orientable 3-manifolds		Two handlebodies of equal genus	Union along the boundary by some homeomorphism
Handle decomposition	Any compact (smooth) n-manifold (and the decomposition is never unique)	Through Morse functions a handle is associated to each critical point.	Balls (called handles)	Union along a subset of the boundaries. Note that the handles must generally be added in a specific order.
Haken hierarchy	Any Haken manifold	Cut along a sequence of incompressible surfaces	3-balls	
Disk decomposition	Certain compact, orientable 3-manifolds	Suture the manifold, then cut along special surfaces (condition on boundary curves and sutures...)	3-balls	
Open book decomposition	Any closed orientable 3-manifold		A link and a family of 2-manifolds that share a boundary with that link	
Trigenus	Compact, closed 3-manifolds	Surgeries	Three orientable handlebodies	Unions along subsurfaces on boundaries of handlebodies

== See also ==
- Surgery theory
