= Trigenus =

In low-dimensional topology, the trigenus of a closed 3-manifold is an invariant consisting of an ordered triple $(g_1,g_2,g_3)$. It is obtained by minimizing the genera of three orientable handle bodies — with no intersection between their interiors— which decompose the manifold as far as the Heegaard genus need only two.

That is, a decomposition $M=V_1\cup V_2\cup V_3$ with ${\rm int} V_i\cap {\rm int} V_j=\varnothing$ for $i,j=1,2,3$ and being $g_i$ the genus of $V_i$.

For orientable spaces, ${\rm trig}(M)=(0,0,h)$, where $h$ is $M$'s Heegaard genus.

For non-orientable spaces the ${\rm trig}$ has the form ${\rm trig}(M)=(0,g_2,g_3)\quad \mbox{or}\quad (1,g_2,g_3)$ depending on the image of the first Stiefel–Whitney characteristic class $w_1$ under a Bockstein homomorphism, respectively for $\beta(w_1)=0\quad \mbox{or}\quad \neq 0.$

It has been proved that the number $g_2$ has a relation with the concept of Stiefel–Whitney surface, that is, an orientable surface $G$ which is embedded in $M$, has minimal genus and represents the first Stiefel–Whitney class under the duality map $D\colon H^1(M;{\mathbb{Z}}_2)\to H_2(M;{\mathbb{Z}}_2),$, that is, $Dw_1(M)=[G]$. If $\beta(w_1)=0 \,$ then ${\rm trig}(M)=(0,2g,g_3) \,$, and if $\beta(w_1)\neq 0. \,$ then ${\rm trig}(M)=(1,2g-1,g_3) \,$.

== Theorem ==
A manifold S is a Stiefel–Whitney surface in M, if and only if S and M−int(N(S)) are orientable.
