= Exponential map (discrete dynamical systems) =

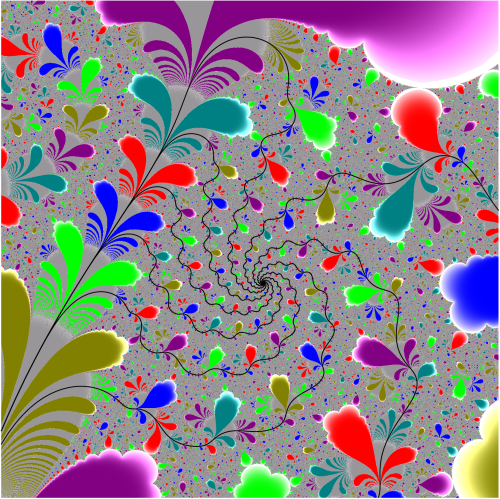
Parameter plane of the complex exponential family f(z)=exp(z)+c with 8 external ( parameter) rays

In the theory of dynamical systems, the exponential map can be used as the evolution function of the discrete nonlinear dynamical system.

== Family ==
The family of exponential functions is called the exponential family.

== Forms ==
There are many forms of these maps, many of which are equivalent under a coordinate transformation. For example two of the most common ones are:

- $E_c : z \to e^z + c$
- $E_\lambda : z \to \lambda e^z$

The second one can be mapped to the first using the fact that $\lambda e^z = e^{z+\ln(\lambda)}$, so $E_\lambda : z \to e^z + \ln(\lambda)$ is the same under the transformation $z=z+\ln(\lambda)$. The only difference is that, due to multi-valued properties of exponentiation, there may be a few select cases that can only be found in one version. Similar arguments can be made for many other formulas.
