= External ray =

An external ray is a curve that runs from infinity toward a Julia or Mandelbrot set. Although this curve is only rarely a half-line (ray) it is called a ray because it is an image of a ray.

External rays are used in complex analysis, particularly in complex dynamics and geometric function theory.

== History ==
External rays were introduced in Douady and Hubbard's study of the Mandelbrot set.

== Types ==
Criteria for classification:

- Plane: parameter or dynamic
- Map
- Bifurcation of dynamic rays
- Stretching
- Landing

=== Plane ===
External rays of (connected) Julia sets on dynamical plane are often called dynamic rays.

External rays of the Mandelbrot set (and similar one-dimensional connectedness loci) on parameter plane are called parameter rays.

=== Bifurcation ===
Dynamic rays can be:

- Bifurcated, branched, broken
- Smooth, unbranched, unbroken

When the filled Julia set is connected, there are no branching external rays. When the Julia set is not connected then some external rays branch.

=== Stretching ===
Stretching rays were introduced by Branner and Hubbard: "The notion of stretching rays is a generalization of that of external rays for the Mandelbrot set to higher degree polynomials."

=== Landing ===
Every rational parameter ray of the Mandelbrot set lands at a single parameter.

== Maps ==
=== Polynomials ===
==== Dynamical plane = z-plane ====
External rays are associated to a compact, full, connected subset $K\,$ of the complex plane as :

- the images of radial rays under the Riemann map of the complement of $K\,$
- the gradient lines of the Green's function of $K\,$
- field lines of Douady-Hubbard potential
- an integral curve of the gradient vector field of the Green's function on neighborhood of infinity

External rays together with equipotential lines of Douady-Hubbard potential ( level sets) form a new polar coordinate system for exterior ( complement ) of $K\,$.

In other words the external rays define vertical foliation which is orthogonal to horizontal foliation defined by the level sets of potential.

===== Uniformization =====
Let $\Psi_c\,$ be the conformal isomorphism from the complement (exterior) of the closed unit disk $\overline{\mathbb{D}}$ to the complement of the filled Julia set $\ K_c$.

$$\Psi_c: \hat{\Complex} \setminus \overline{\mathbb{D}} \to \hat{\Complex} \setminus K_c$$

where $\hat{\Complex}$ denotes the extended complex plane. Let $\Phi_c = \Psi_c^{-1}\,$ denote the Boettcher map. $\Phi_c\,$ is a uniformizing map of the basin of attraction of infinity, because it conjugates $f_c$ on the complement of the filled Julia set $K_c$ to $f_0(z)=z^2$ on the complement of the unit disk:

$$\begin{align}
\Phi_c: \hat{\Complex} \setminus K_c &\to \hat{\Complex} \setminus \overline{\mathbb{D}}\\
z & \mapsto \lim_{n\to \infty} (f_c^n(z))^{2^{-n}}
\end{align}$$

and

$$\Phi_c \circ f_c \circ \Phi_c^{-1} = f_0$$

A value $w = \Phi_c(z)$ is called the Boettcher coordinate for a point $z \in \hat{\Complex}\setminus K_c$.

===== Formal definition of dynamic ray =====
Polar coordinate system and $\psi_c$ for $c=-2$

The external ray of angle $\theta\,$ noted as $\mathcal{R}^K _{\theta}$ is:

- the image under $\Psi_c\,$ of straight lines $\mathcal{R}_{\theta} = \{\left(r\cdot e^{2\pi i \theta}\right) : \ r > 1 \}$

$$\mathcal{R}^K  _{\theta} = \Psi_c(\mathcal{R}_{\theta})$$

- set of points of exterior of filled-in Julia set with the same external angle $\theta$

$$\mathcal{R}^K _{\theta} = \{ z\in \hat{\Complex} \setminus K_c : \arg(\Phi_c(z)) = \theta \}$$

====== Properties ======
The external ray for a periodic angle $\theta\,$ satisfies:

$$f(\mathcal{R}^K  _{\theta}) =  \mathcal{R}^K  _{2 \theta}$$

and its landing point $\gamma_f(\theta)$ satisfies:

$$f(\gamma_f(\theta)) = \gamma_f(2\theta)$$

==== Parameter plane = c-plane ====
"Parameter rays are simply the curves that run perpendicular to the equipotential curves of the M-set."

===== Uniformization =====
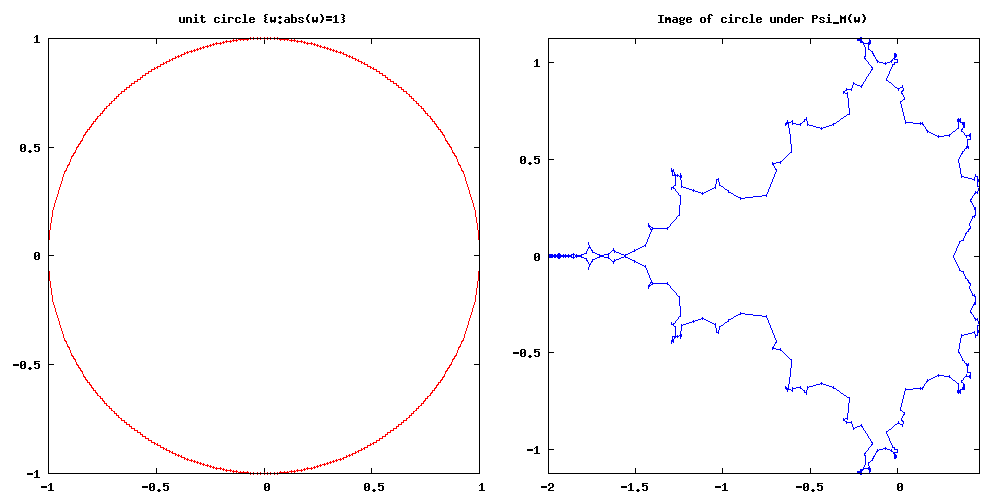
Boundary of Mandelbrot set as an image of unit circle under $\Psi_M\,$

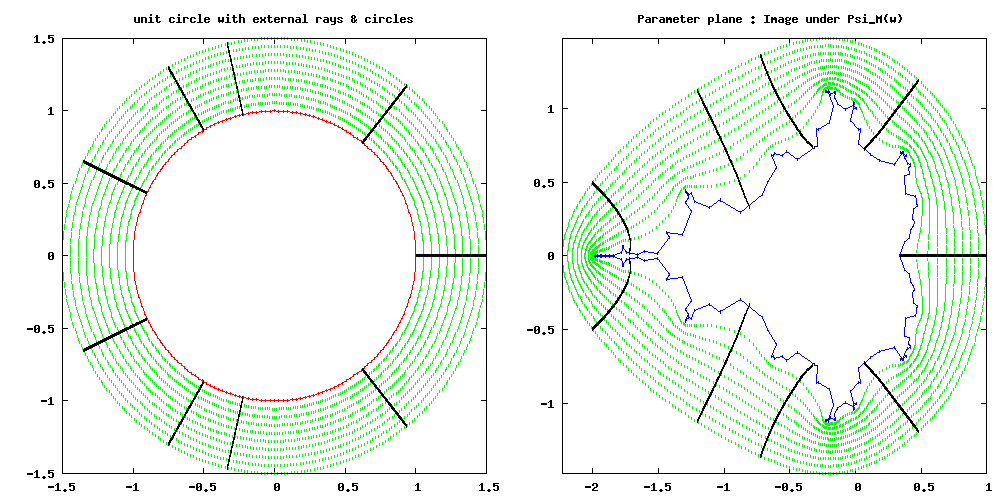
Uniformization of complement (exterior) of Mandelbrot set

Let $\Psi_M\,$ be the mapping from the complement (exterior) of the closed unit disk $\overline{\mathbb{D}}$ to the complement of the Mandelbrot set $\ M$.

$$\Psi_M:\mathbb{\hat{C}}\setminus \overline{\mathbb{D}}\to\mathbb{\hat{C}}\setminus M$$

and Boettcher map (function) $\Phi_M\,$, which is uniformizing map of complement of Mandelbrot set, because it conjugates complement of the Mandelbrot set $\ M$ and the complement (exterior) of the closed unit disk

$$\Phi_M: \mathbb{\hat{C}}\setminus M \to   \mathbb{\hat{C}}\setminus \overline{\mathbb{D}}$$

it can be normalized so that :

$\frac{\Phi_M(c)}{c} \to 1 \ as\ c \to \infty \,$

where :

$\mathbb{\hat{C}}$ denotes the extended complex plane

Jungreis function $\Psi_M\,$ is the inverse of uniformizing map :

$$\Psi_M = \Phi_{M}^{-1} \,$$

In the case of complex quadratic polynomial one can compute this map using Laurent series about infinity

$$c = \Psi_M (w)  =  w + \sum_{m=0}^{\infty} b_m w^{-m} = w -\frac{1}{2} + \frac{1}{8w} - \frac{1}{4w^2} + \frac{15}{128w^3} + ...\,$$

where

$$c \in \mathbb{\hat{C}}\setminus M$$

$$w \in \mathbb{\hat{C}}\setminus \overline{\mathbb{D}}$$

===== Formal definition of parameter ray =====
The external ray of angle $\theta\,$ is:

- the image under $\Psi_c\,$ of straight lines $\mathcal{R}_{\theta} = \{\left(r*e^{2\pi i \theta}\right) : \ r > 1 \}$

$$\mathcal{R}^M  _{\theta} = \Psi_M(\mathcal{R}_{\theta})$$

- set of points of exterior of Mandelbrot set with the same external angle $\theta$

$$\mathcal{R}^M  _{\theta} = \{ c\in \mathbb{\hat{C}}\setminus M  : \arg(\Phi_M(c)) =  \theta \}$$

===== Definition of the Boettcher map =====
Douady and Hubbard define:

$\Phi_M(c) \ \overset{\underset{\mathrm{def}}{}}{=} \ \Phi_c(z=c)\,$

so external angle of point $c\,$ of parameter plane is equal to external angle of point $z=c\,$ of dynamical plane

==== External angle ====
collecting bits outwards

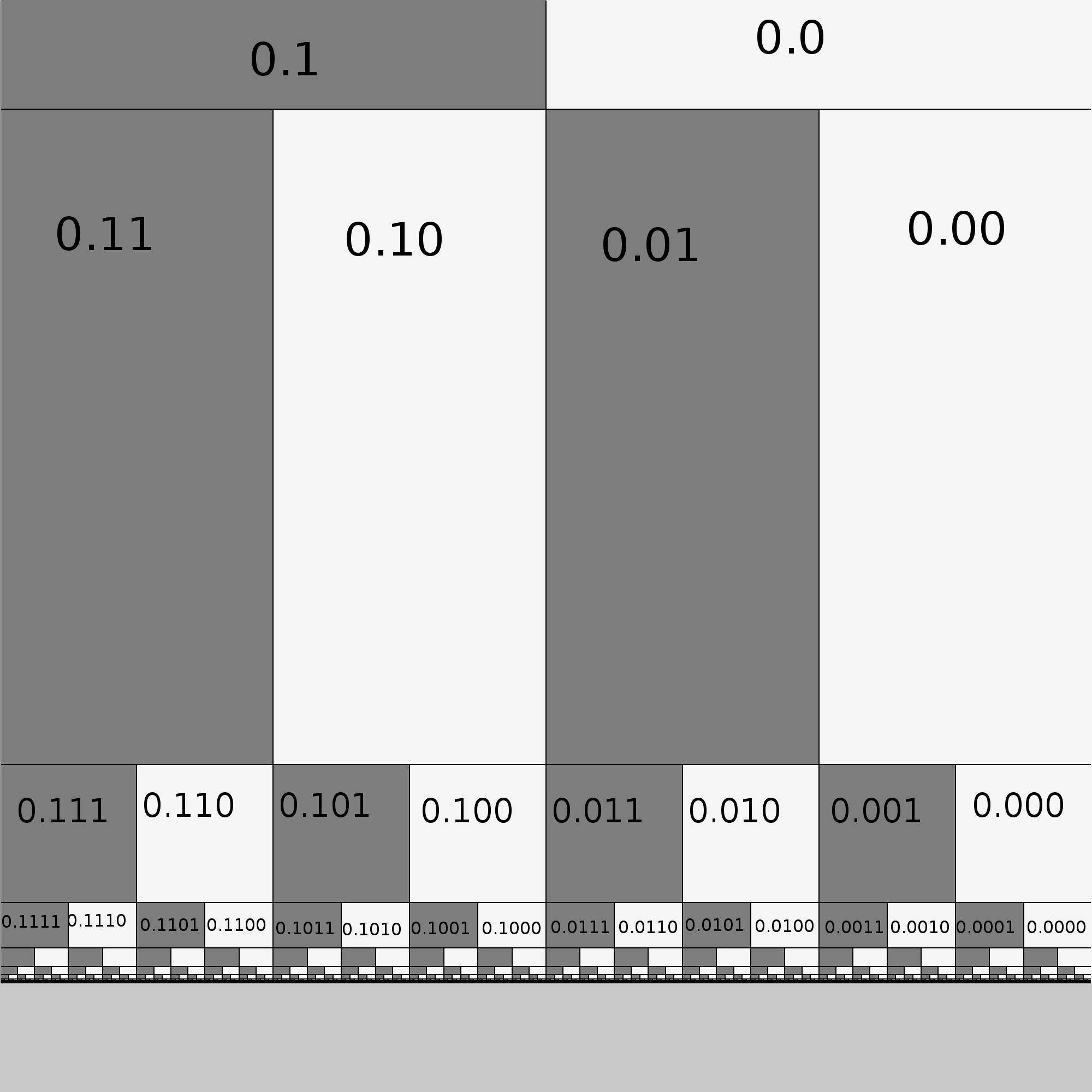
Binary decomposition of unrolled circle plane

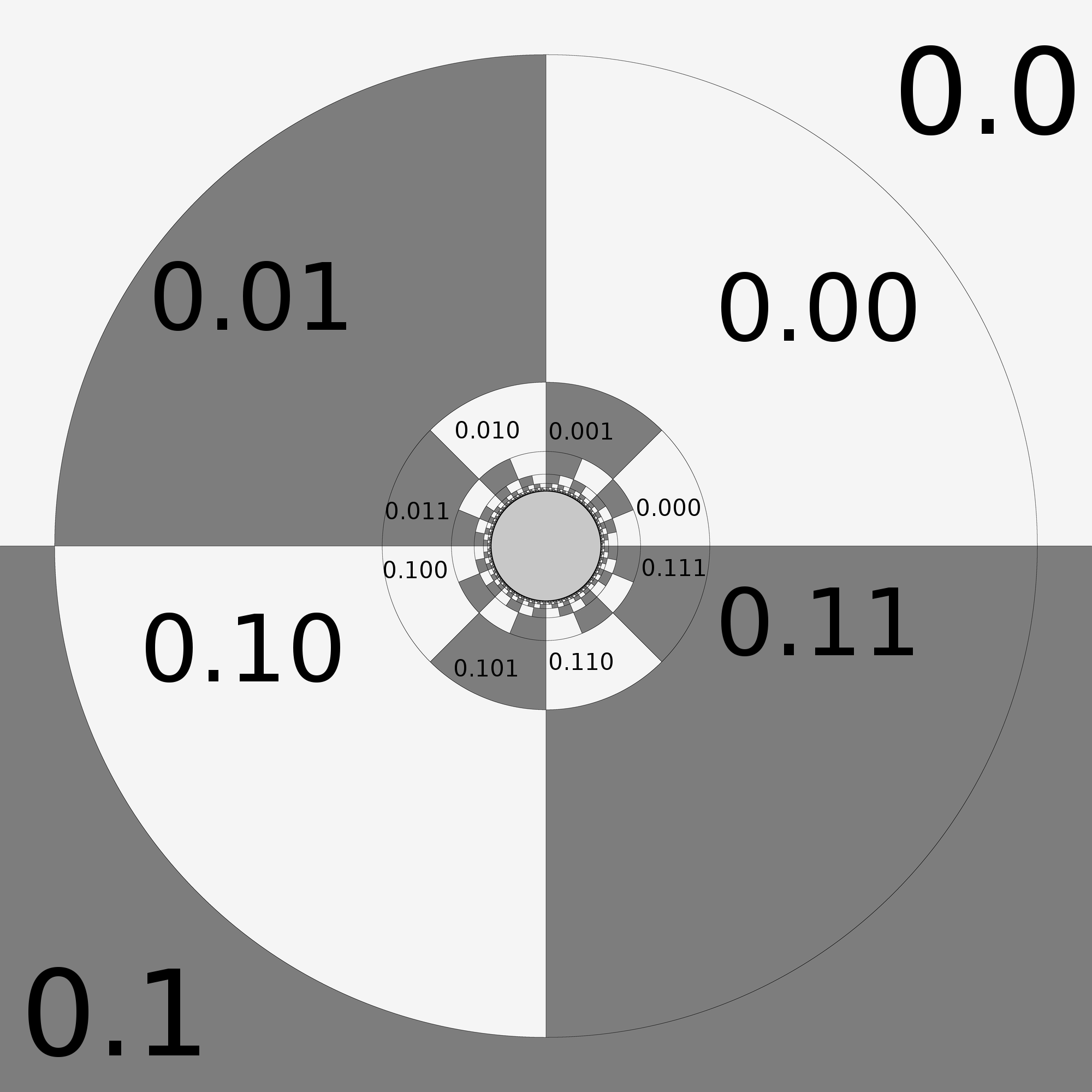
binary decomposition of dynamic plane for f(z) = z^2

Angle θ is named external angle ( argument ).

Principal value of external angles are measured in turns modulo 1

1 turn = 360 degrees = 2 × π radians

Compare different types of angles :

- external ( point of set's exterior )
- internal ( point of component's interior )
- plain ( argument of complex number )

| | external angle | internal angle | plain angle |
| parameter plane | $\arg(\Phi_M(c)) \,$ | $\arg(\rho_n(c)) \,$ | $\arg(c) \,$ |
| dynamic plane | $\arg(\Phi_c(z)) \,$ | | $\arg(z) \,$ |

===== Computation of external argument =====
- argument of Böttcher coordinate as an external argument
  - $\arg_M(c) = \arg(\Phi_M(c))$
  - $\arg_c(z) = \arg(\Phi_c(z))$
- kneading sequence as a binary expansion of external argument

=== Transcendental maps ===
For transcendental maps ( for example exponential ) infinity is not a fixed point but an essential singularity and there is no Boettcher isomorphism.

Here dynamic ray is defined as a curve :

- connecting a point in an escaping set and infinity
- lying in an escaping set

== Images ==
=== Dynamic rays ===
unbranched

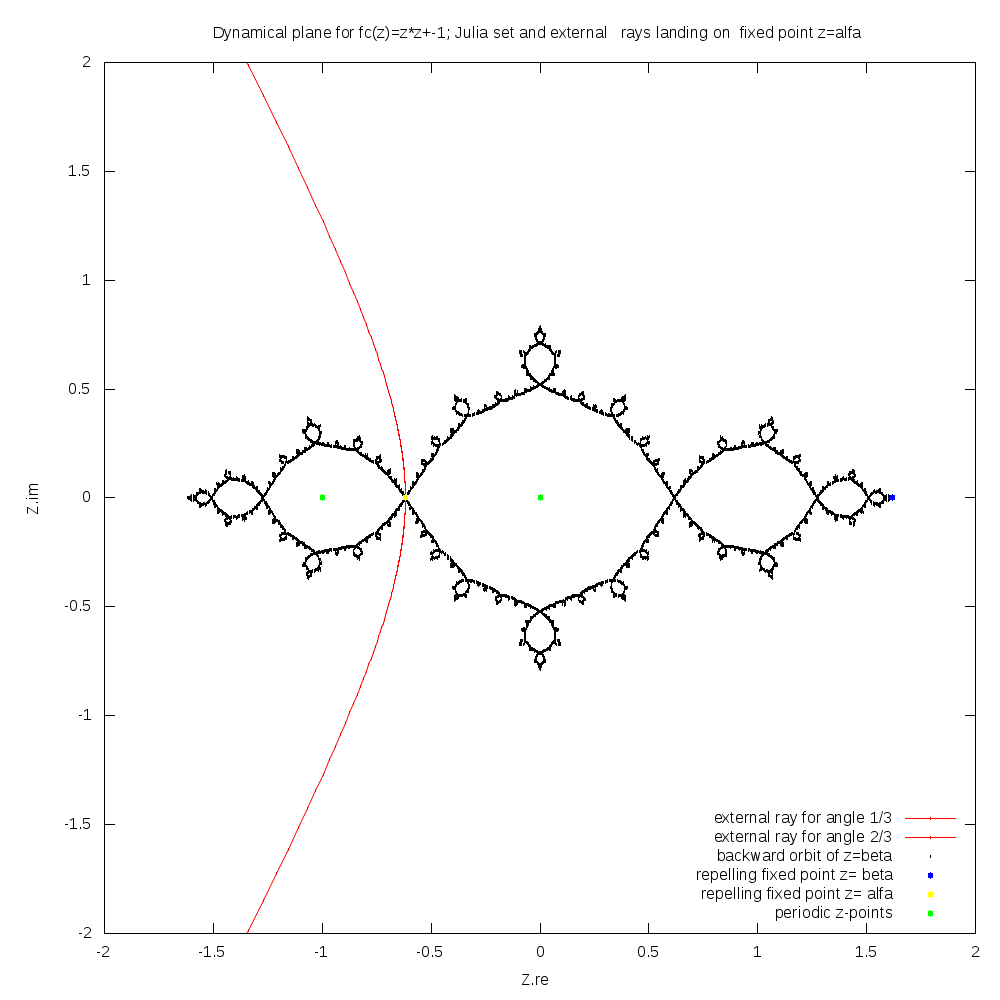
Julia set for $f_c(z) = z^2 -1$ with 2 external ray landing on repelling fixed point alpha

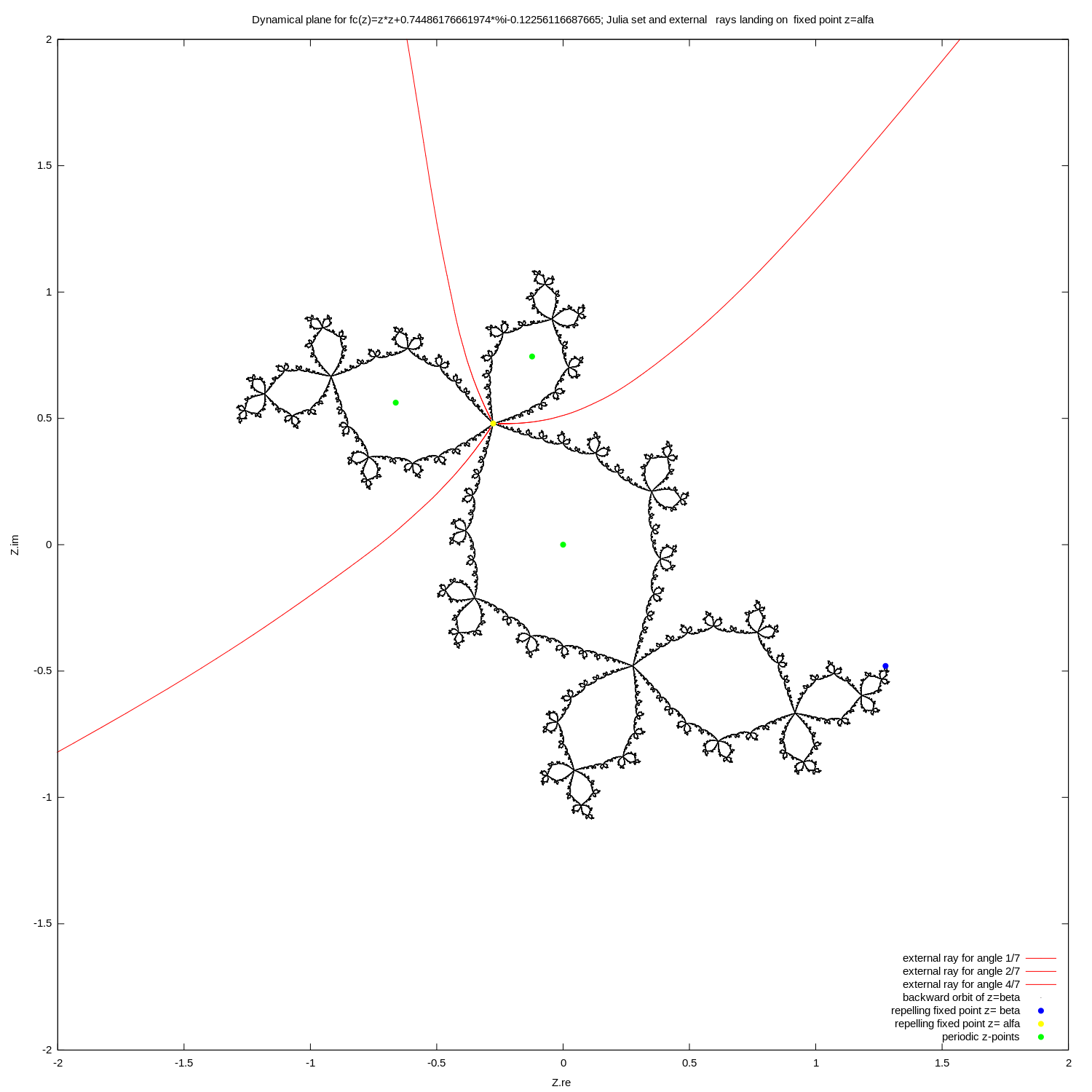
Julia set and 3 external rays landing on fixed point $\alpha_c\,$

Dynamic external rays landing on repelling period 3 cycle and 3 internal rays landing on fixed point $\alpha_c\,$

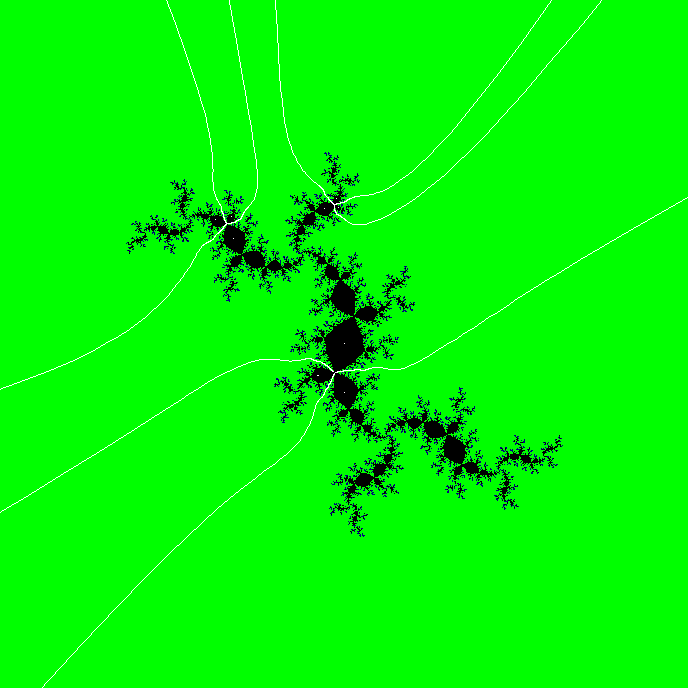
Julia set with external rays landing on period 3 orbit

Rays landing on parabolic fixed point for periods 2-40

branched

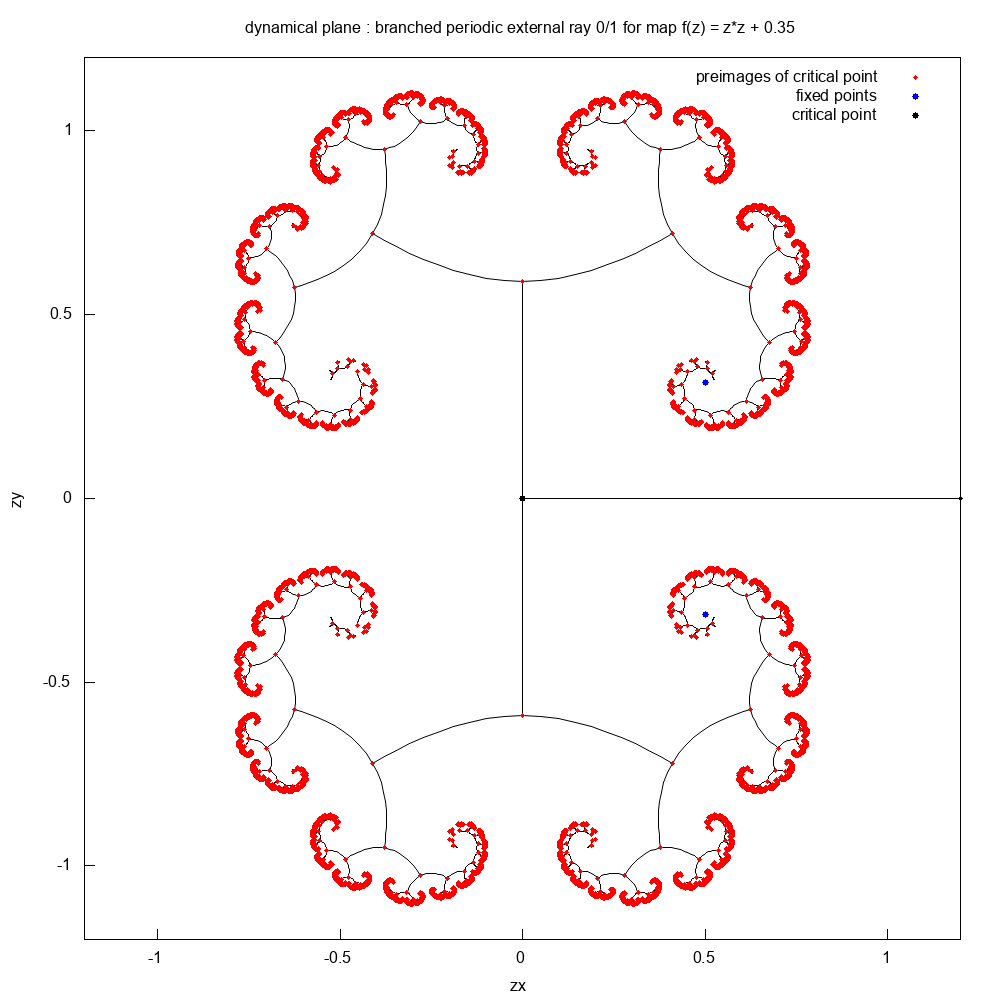
Branched dynamic ray

=== Parameter rays ===
Mandelbrot set for complex quadratic polynomial with parameter rays of root points

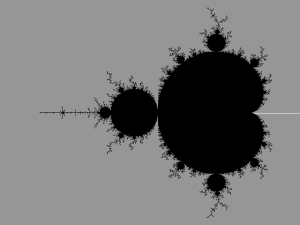
External rays for angles of the form : n / ( 2^{1} - 1) (0/1; 1/1) landing on the point c= 1/4, which is cusp of main cardioid ( period 1 component)

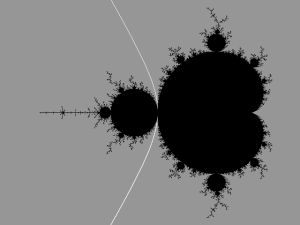
External rays for angles of the form : n / ( 2^{2} - 1) (1/3, 2/3) landing on the point c= - 3/4, which is root point of period 2 component

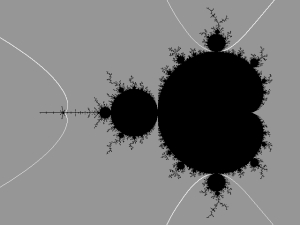
External rays for angles of the form : n / ( 2^{3} - 1) (1/7,2/7) (3/7,4/7) landing on the point c= -1.75 = -7/4 (5/7,6/7) landing on the root points of period 3 components.

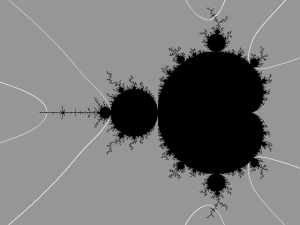
External rays for angles of form : n / ( 2^{4} - 1) (1/15,2/15) (3/15, 4/15) (6/15, 9/15) landing on the root point c= -5/4 (7/15, 8/15) (11/15,12/15) (13/15, 14/15) landing on the root points of period 4 components.

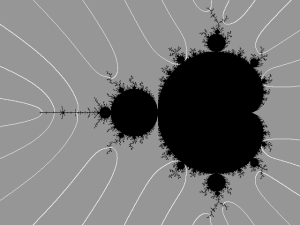
External rays for angles of form : n / ( 2^{5} - 1) landing on the root points of period 5 components
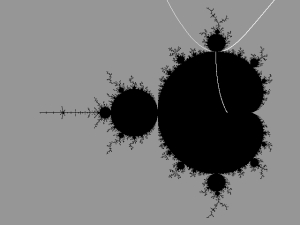
internal ray of main cardioid of angle 1/3: starts from center of main cardioid c=0, ends in the root point of period 3 component, which is the landing point of parameter (external) rays of angles 1/7 and 2/7

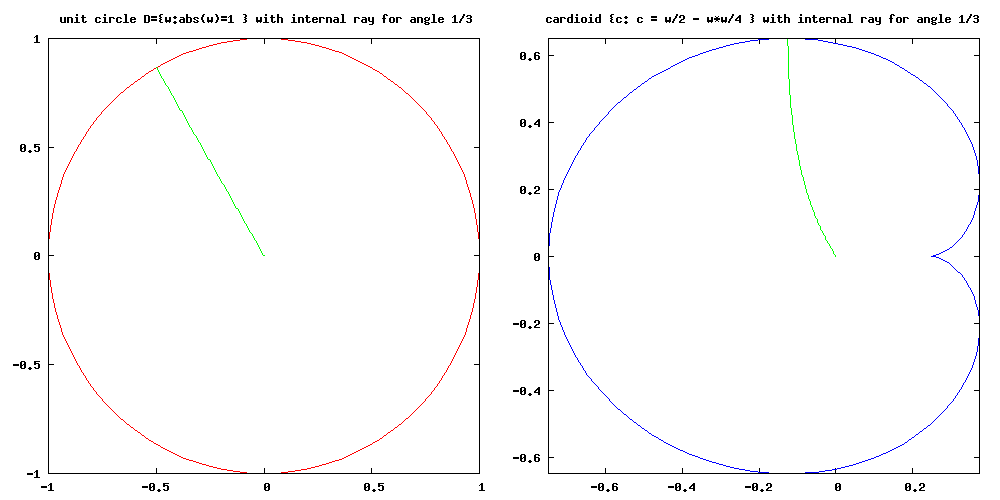
Internal ray for angle 1/3 of main cardioid made by conformal map from unit circle
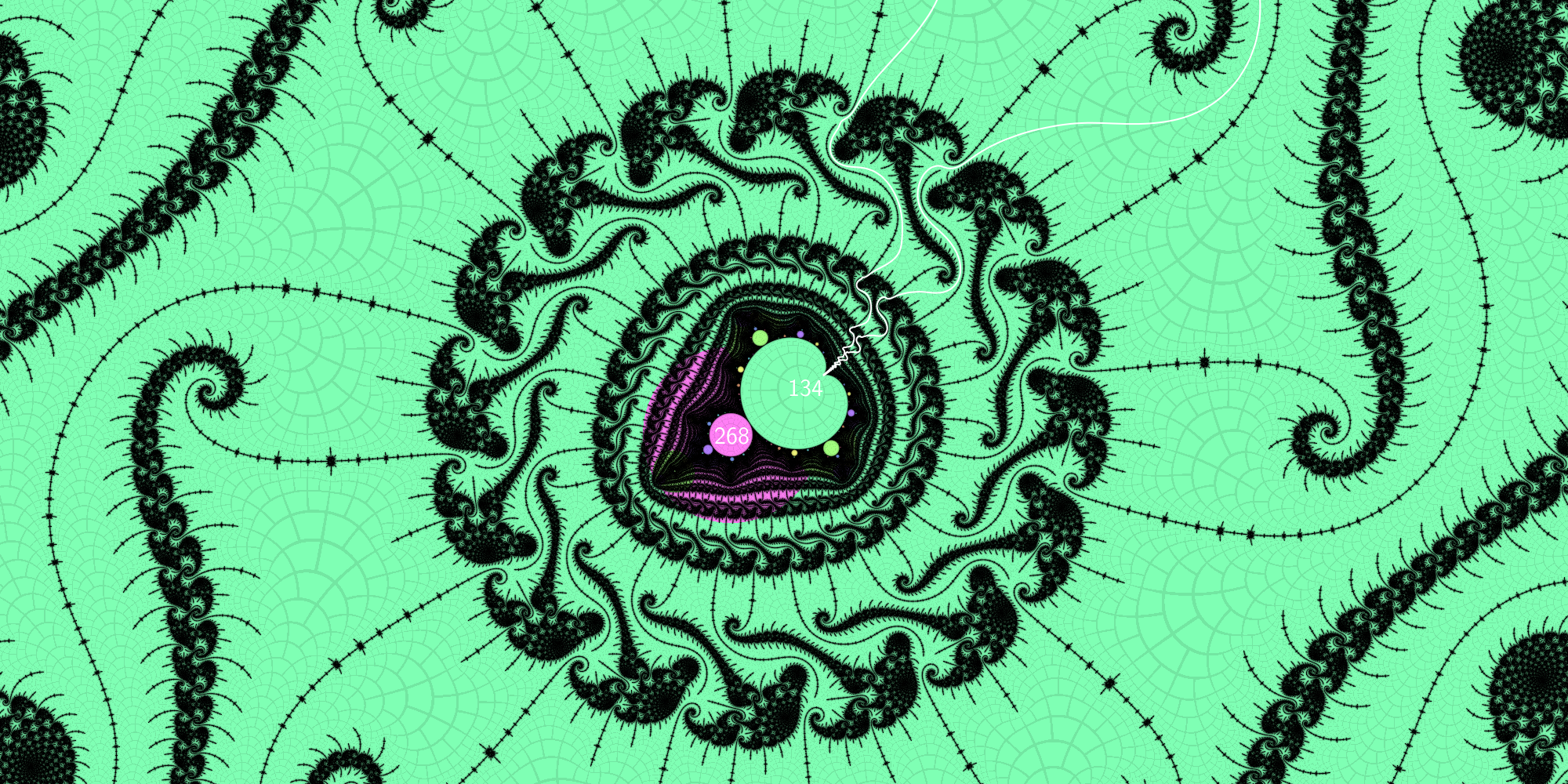
Mini Mandelbrot set with period 134 and 2 external rays

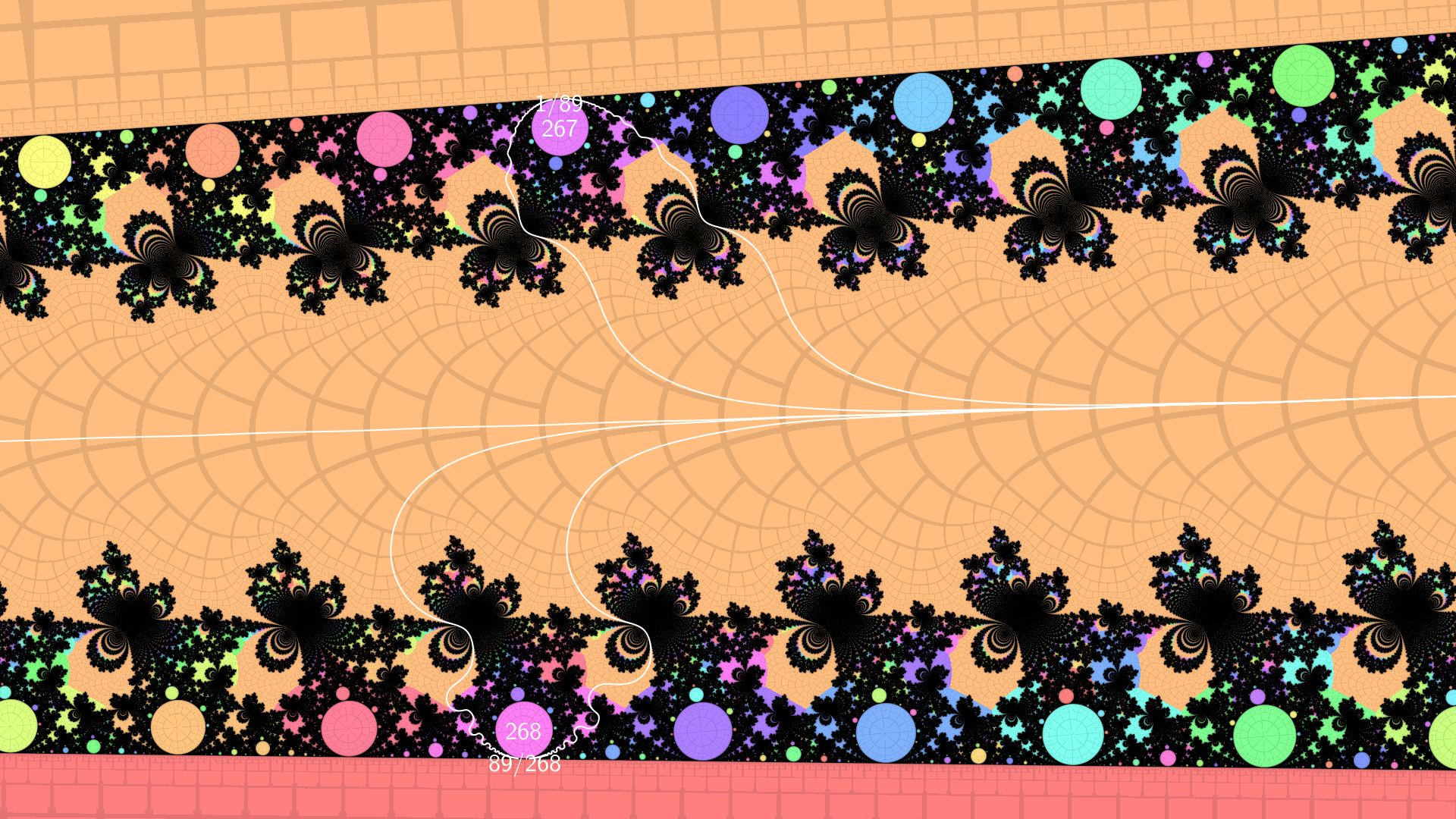

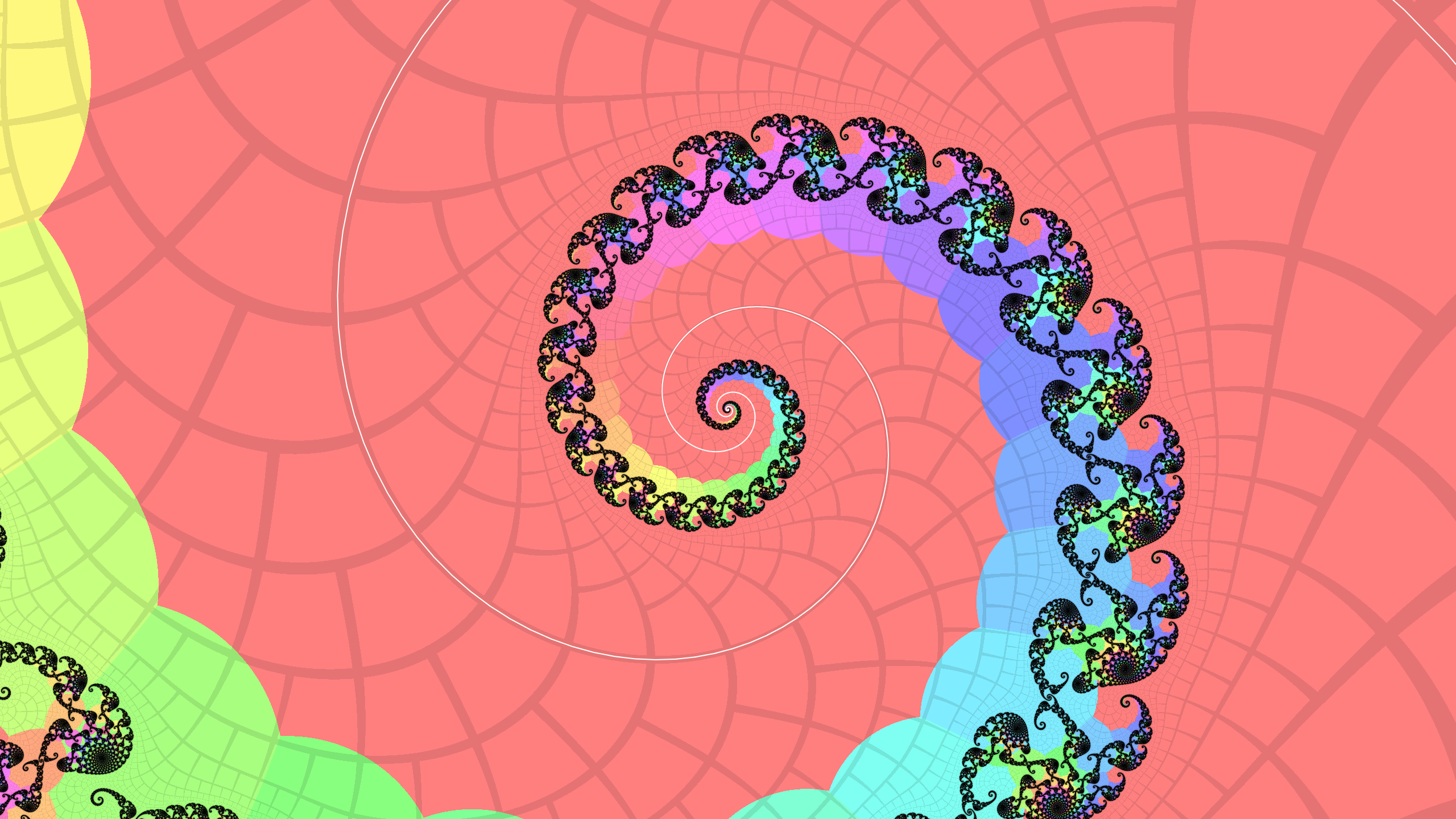

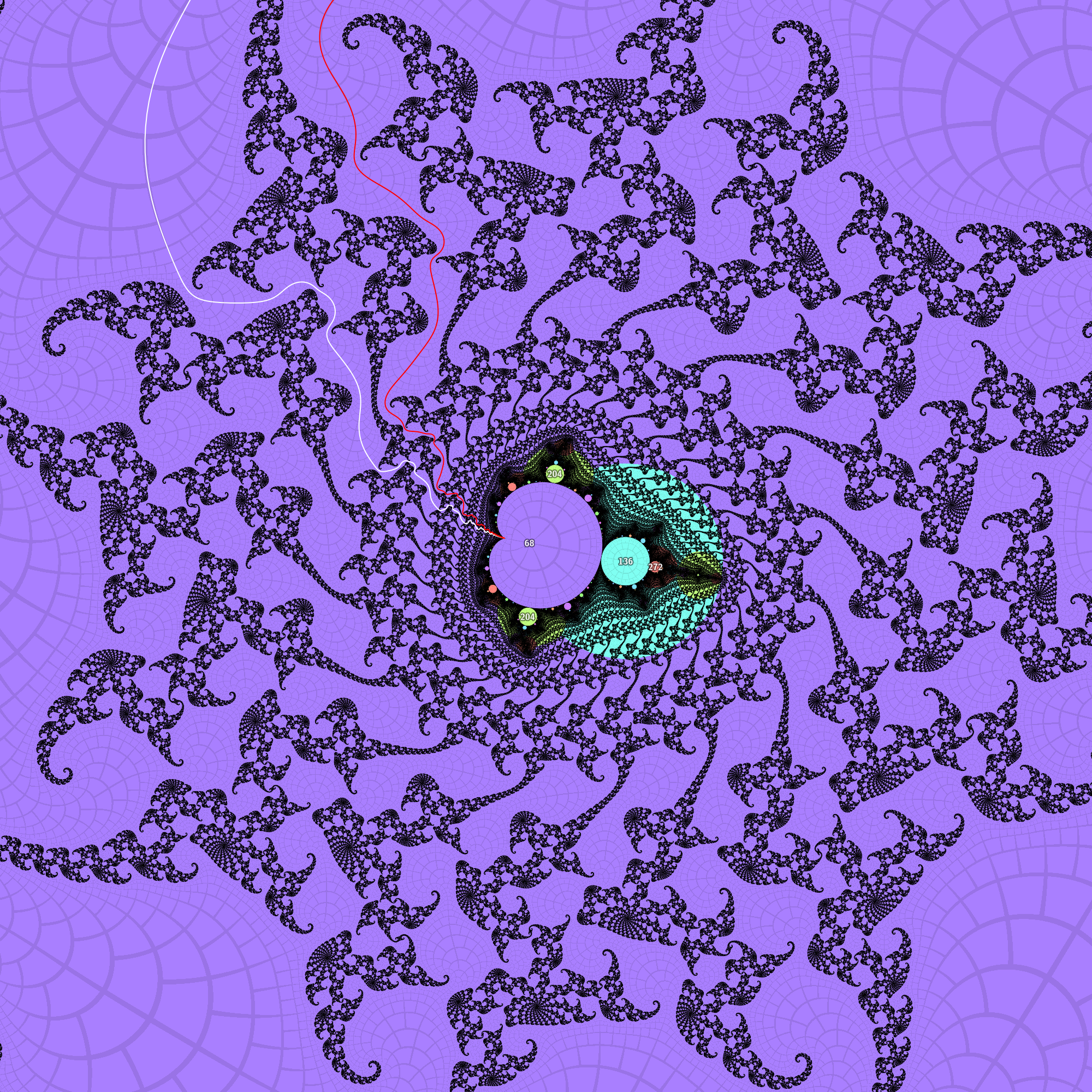

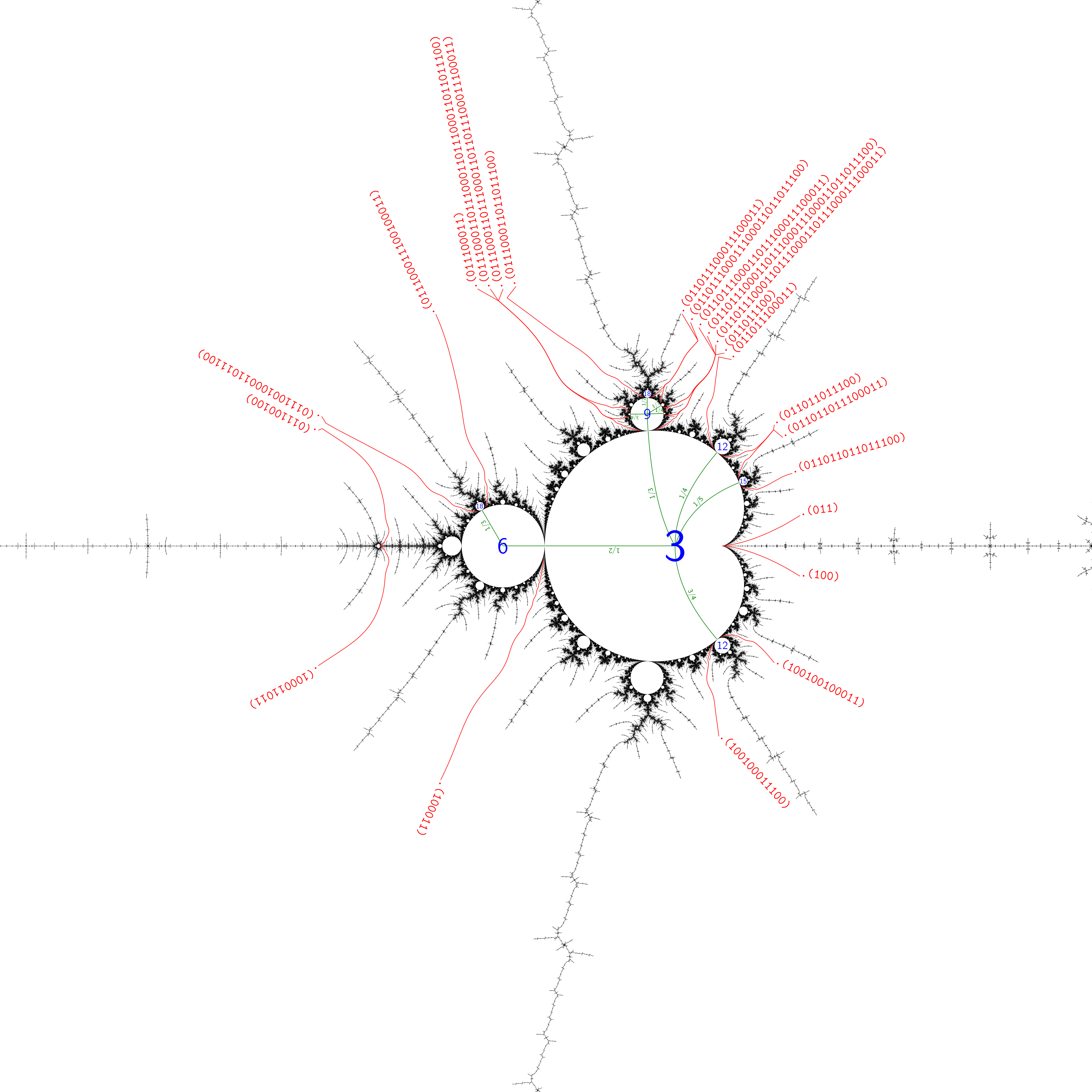
Wakes near the period 3 island

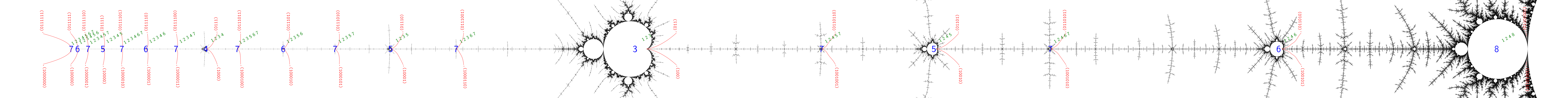
Wakes along the main antenna

Parameter space of the complex exponential family f(z)=exp(z)+c. Eight parameter rays landing at this parameter are drawn in black.

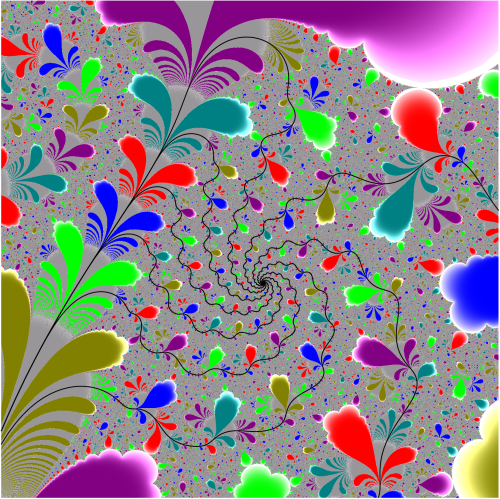

== Programs that can draw external rays ==
- Mandel - program by Wolf Jung written in C++ using Qt with source code available under the GNU General Public License
  - Java applets by Evgeny Demidov ( code of mndlbrot::turn function by Wolf Jung has been ported to Java ) with free source code
  - ezfract by Michael Sargent, uses the code by Wolf Jung
- OTIS by Tomoki KAWAHIRA - Java applet without source code
- Spider XView program by Yuval Fisher
- YABMP by Prof. Eugene Zaustinsky for MS-DOS without source code
- DH_Drawer by Arnaud Chéritat written for Windows 95 without source code
- Linas Vepstas C programs for Linux console with source code
- Program Julia by Curtis T. McMullen written in C and Linux commands for C shell console with source code
- mjwinq program by Matjaz Erat written in delphi/windows without source code ( For the external rays it uses the methods from quad.c in julia.tar by Curtis T McMullen)
- RatioField by Gert Buschmann, for windows with Pascal source code for Dev-Pascal 1.9.2 (with Free Pascal compiler )
- Mandelbrot program by Milan Va, written in Delphi with source code
- Power MANDELZOOM by Robert Munafo
- ruff by Claude Heiland-Allen

== See also ==
- external rays of Misiurewicz point
- Orbit portrait
- Periodic points of complex quadratic mappings
- Prouhet-Thue-Morse constant
- Carathéodory's theorem
- Field lines of Julia sets
