= Orbit portrait =

In mathematics, an orbit portrait is a combinatorial tool used in complex dynamics for understanding the behavior of one-complex dimensional quadratic maps.

In simple words one can say that it is :

- a list of external angles for which rays land on points of that orbit
- graph showing above list

== Definition ==
Given a quadratic map

$$f_c : z \mapsto z^2 + c.$$

from the complex plane to itself

$$f_c : \mathbb{\Complex} \to  \mathbb{\Complex}$$

and a repelling or parabolic periodic orbit ${\mathcal O} = \{z_1, \ldots z_n\}$ of $f$, so that $f(z_j) = z_{j+1}$ (where subscripts are taken 1 + modulo $n$), let $A_j$ be the set of angles whose corresponding external rays land at $z_j$.

Then the set ${\mathcal P} = {\mathcal P}({\mathcal O}) = \{A_1, \ldots A_n\}$ is called the orbit portrait of the periodic orbit ${\mathcal O}$.

All of the sets $A_j$ must have the same number of elements, which is called the valence of the portrait.

== Examples ==
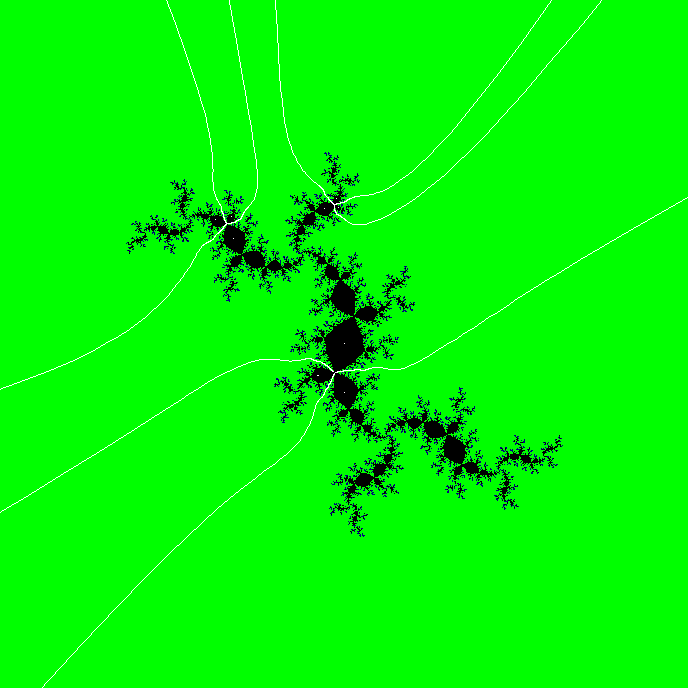
Julia set with external rays landing on period-3 orbit

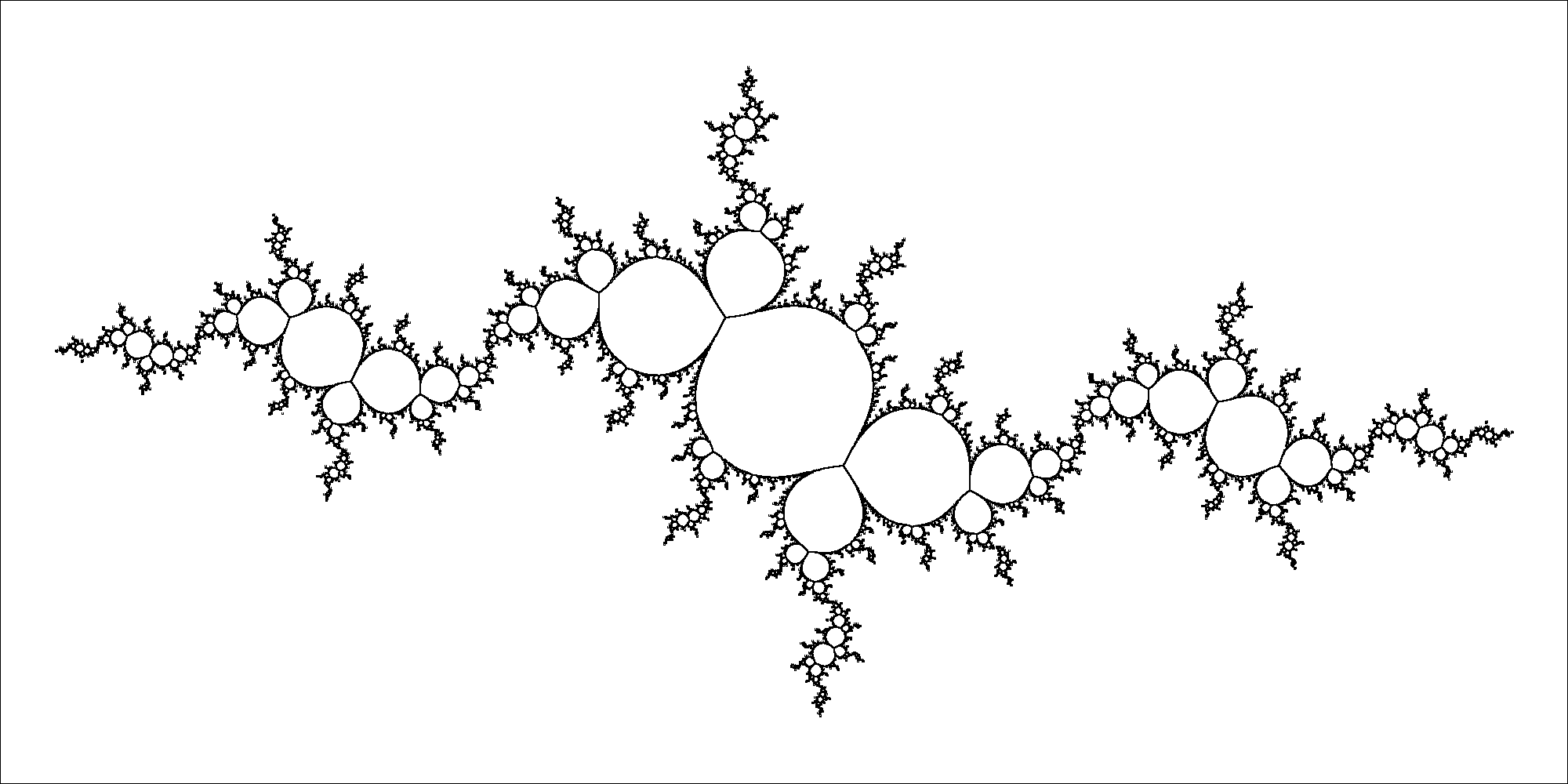
Julia set with period-two parabolic orbit. The associated orbit portrait has characteristic arc I = (22/63, 25/63) and valence v = 3 rays per orbit point.

=== Parabolic or repelling orbit portrait ===
==== valence 2 ====
${\mathcal P} = \left \{\left( \frac{1}{3},\frac{2}{3} \right) \right \rbrace$

${\mathcal P} = \left \{ \left( \frac{3}{7} , \frac{4}{7} \right), \left( \frac{6}{7} , \frac{1}{7} \right), \left( \frac{5}{7} , \frac{2}{7} \right) \right \rbrace$

${\mathcal P} = \left \{ \left( \frac{4}{9} , \frac{5}{9} \right), \left( \frac{8}{9} , \frac{1}{9} \right), \left( \frac{7}{9} , \frac{2}{9} \right) \right \rbrace$

${\mathcal P} = \left \{ \left( \frac{11}{31} , \frac{12}{31} \right), \left( \frac{22}{31} , \frac{24}{31} \right), \left( \frac{13}{31} , \frac{17}{31} \right), \left( \frac{26}{31} , \frac{3}{31} \right), \left( \frac{21}{31} , \frac{6}{31} \right) \right \rbrace$

==== valence 3 ====
Valence is 3 so rays land on each orbit point.

3 external rays of period 3 cycle : $\mathcal{R}_{\frac{1}{7}} , \mathcal{R}_{\frac{2}{7}} , \mathcal{R}_{\frac{4}{7}} \,$, which land on fixed point $z=\alpha_c\,$

${\mathcal P} = \left \{ \left(\frac{1}{7},\frac{2}{7} ,\frac{4}{7}\right)\right \rbrace$

For complex quadratic polynomial with c= -0.03111+0.79111*i portrait of parabolic period 3 orbit is :

${\mathcal P} = \left \{ \left(\frac{74}{511},\frac{81}{511},\frac{137}{511} \right) , \left(\frac{148}{511},\frac{162}{511},\frac{274}{511} \right) , \left(\frac{296}{511},\frac{324}{511},\frac{37}{511} \right) \right \rbrace$

Rays for above angles land on points of that orbit . Parameter c is a center of period 9 hyperbolic component of Mandelbrot set.

For parabolic julia set c = -1.125 + 0.21650635094611*i. It is a root point between period 2 and period 6 components of Mandelbrot set. Orbit portrait of period 2 orbit with valence 3 is :

${\mathcal P} = \left \{ \left(\frac{22}{63},\frac{25}{63},\frac{37}{63} \right) , \left(\frac{11}{63},\frac{44}{63},\frac{50}{63} \right) \right \rbrace$

==== valence 4 ====
${\mathcal P} = \left \{ \left(\frac{1}{15},\frac{2}{15} ,\frac{4}{15} ,\frac{8}{15} \right) \right \rbrace$

== Formal orbit portraits ==
Every orbit portrait ${\mathcal P}$ has the following properties:

- Each $A_j$ is a finite subset of ${\mathbb R} / {\mathbb Z}$
- The doubling map on the circle gives a bijection from $A_j$ to $A_{j+1}$ and preserves cyclic order of the angles.
- All of the angles in all of the sets $A_1, \ldots, A_n$ are periodic under the doubling map of the circle, and all of the angles have the same exact period. This period must be a multiple of $n$, so the period is of the form $rn$, where $r$ is called the recurrent ray period.
- The sets $A_j$ are pairwise unlinked, which is to say that given any pair of them, there are two disjoint intervals of ${\mathbb R }/ {\mathbb Z}$ where each interval contains one of the sets.

Any collection $\{A_1, \ldots, A_n\}$ of subsets of the circle which satisfy these four properties above is called a formal orbit portrait. It is a theorem of John Milnor that every formal orbit portrait is realized by the actual orbit portrait of a periodic orbit of some quadratic one-complex-dimensional map. Orbit portraits contain dynamical information about how external rays and their landing points map in the plane, but formal orbit portraits are no more than combinatorial objects. Milnor's theorem states that, in truth, there is no distinction between the two.

== Trivial orbit portraits ==
Orbit portrait where all of the sets $A_j$ have only a single element are called trivial, except for orbit portrait ${{0}}$. An alternative definition is that an orbit portrait is nontrivial if it is maximal, which in this case means that there is no orbit portrait that strictly contains it (i.e. there does not exist an orbit portrait $\{A^\prime_1,\ldots,A^\prime_n\}$ such that $A_j \subsetneq A^\prime_j$). It is easy to see that every trivial formal orbit portrait is realized as the orbit portrait of some orbit of the map $f_0(z) = z^2$, since every external ray of this map lands, and they all land at distinct points of the Julia set. Trivial orbit portraits are pathological in some respects, and in the sequel we will refer only to nontrivial orbit portraits.

== Arcs ==
In an orbit portrait $\{A_1, \ldots, A_n\}$, each $A_j$ is a finite subset of the circle $\mathbb R / \mathbb Z$, so each $A_j$ divides the circle into a number of disjoint intervals, called complementary arcs based at the point $z_j$. The length of each interval is referred to as its angular width. Each $z_j$ has a unique largest arc based at it, which is called its critical arc. The critical arc always has length greater than $\frac 1 2$

These arcs have the property that every arc based at $z_j$, except for the critical arc, maps diffeomorphically to an arc based $z_{j+1}$, and the critical arc covers every arc based at $z_{j+1}$ once, except for a single arc, which it covers twice. The arc that it covers twice is called the critical value arc for $z_{j+1}$. This is not necessarily distinct from the critical arc.

When $c$ escapes to infinity under iteration of $f_c$, or when $c$ is in the Julia set, then $c$ has a well-defined external angle. Call this angle $\theta_c$. $\theta_c$ is in every critical value arc. Also, the two inverse images of $c$ under the doubling map ($\frac {\theta_c} 2$ and $\frac {\theta_c + 1} 2$) are both in every critical arc.

Among all of the critical value arcs for all of the $A_j$'s, there is a unique smallest critical value arc ${\mathcal I}_{\mathcal P}$, called the characteristic arc which is strictly contained within every other critical value arc. The characteristic arc is a complete invariant of an orbit portrait, in the sense that two orbit portraits are identical if and only if they have the same characteristic arc.

== Sectors ==
Much as the rays landing on the orbit divide up the circle, they divide up the complex plane. For every point $z_j$ of the orbit, the external rays landing at $z_j$ divide the plane into $v$ open sets called sectors based at $z_j$. Sectors are naturally identified the complementary arcs based at the same point. The angular width of a sector is defined as the length of its corresponding complementary arc. Sectors are called critical sectors or critical value sectors when the corresponding arcs are, respectively, critical arcs and critical value arcs.

Sectors also have the interesting property that $0$ is in the critical sector of every point, and $c$, the critical value of $f_c$, is in the critical value sector.

== Parameter wakes ==
Two parameter rays with angles $t_-$ and $t_+$ land at the same point of the Mandelbrot set in parameter space if and only if there exists an orbit portrait $\mathcal P$ with the interval $[t_-, t_+]$ as its characteristic arc. For any orbit portrait $\mathcal P$ let $r_{\mathcal P}$ be the common landing point of the two external angles in parameter space corresponding to the characteristic arc of $\mathcal P$. These two parameter rays, along with their common landing point, split the parameter space into two open components. Let the component that does not contain the point $0$ be called the $\mathcal P$-wake and denoted as ${\mathcal W}_{\mathcal P}$. A quadratic polynomial $f_c(z) = z^2 + c$ realizes the orbit portrait ${\mathcal P}$ with a repelling orbit exactly when $c \in {\mathcal W}_{\mathcal P}$. ${\mathcal P}$ is realized with a parabolic orbit only for the single value $c= r_{\mathcal P}$ for about

== Primitive and satellite orbit portraits ==
Other than the zero portrait, there are two types of orbit portraits: primitive and satellite. If $v$ is the valence of an orbit portrait $\mathcal P$ and $r$ is the recurrent ray period, then these two types may be characterized as follows:

- Primitive orbit portraits have $r = 1$ and $v = 2$. Every ray in the portrait is mapped to itself by $f^n$. Each $A_j$ is a pair of angles, each in a distinct orbit of the doubling map. In this case, $r_{\mathcal P}$ is the base point of a baby Mandelbrot set in parameter space.
- Satellite orbit portraits have $r = v \ge 2$. In this case, all of the angles make up a single orbit under the doubling map. Additionally, $r_{\mathcal P}$ is the base point of a parabolic bifurcation in parameter space.

== Generalizations ==
Orbit portraits turn out to be useful combinatorial objects in studying the connection between the dynamics and the parameter spaces of other families of maps as well. In particular, they have been used to study the patterns of all periodic dynamical rays landing on a periodic cycle of a unicritical anti-holomorphic polynomial.

== See also ==
- Lamination
