= Branched surface =

In mathematics, a branched surface is a generalization of both surfaces and train tracks.

== Definition ==
A surface is a space that locally looks like $\mathbb{R}^2$ (homeomorphic to the Euclidean plane).

Consider, however, the space obtained by taking the quotient of two copies A,B of $\mathbb{R}^2$ under the identification of a closed half-space of each with a closed half-space of the other. This will be a surface except along a single line. Now, pick another copy C of $\mathbb{R}$ and glue it and A together along halfspaces so that the singular line of this gluing is transverse in A to the previous singular line.

Call this complicated space K. A branched surface is a space that is locally modeled on K.

== Weight ==
A branched manifold can have a weight assigned to various of its subspaces; if this is done, the space is often called a weighted branched manifold. Weights are non-negative real numbers and are assigned to subspaces N that satisfy the following:

- N is open.
- N does not include any points whose only neighborhoods are the quotient space described above.
- N is maximal with respect to the above two conditions.

That is, N is a component of the branched surface minus its branching set. Weights are assigned so that if a component branches into two other components, then the sum of the weights of the two unidentified halfplanes of that neighborhood is the weight of the identified halfplane.

== See also ==
- Branched covering
- Branched manifold
