= Michael Kapovich =

Russian-American mathematician (1963–2026)

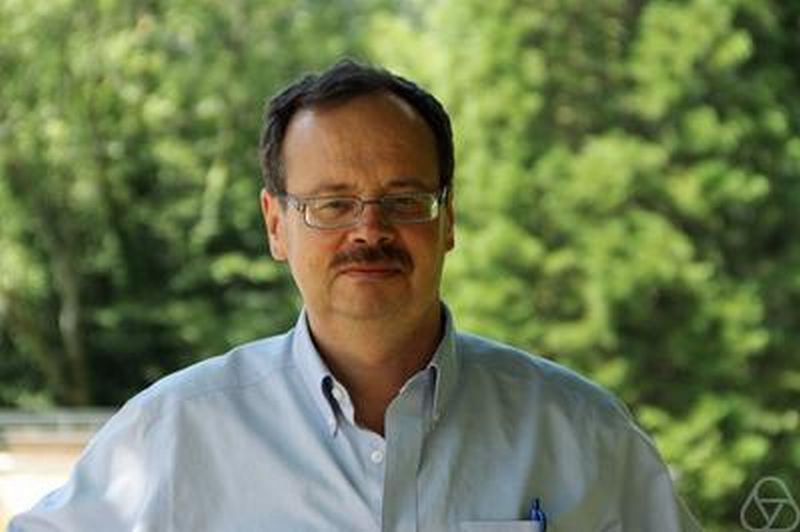
Kapovich in 2015

Michael Kapovich (also Misha Kapovich, born Mikhail Erikovich Kapovich, Russian: Михаил Эрикович Капович; March 13, 1963 – June 16, 2026) was a Russian-American mathematician.

Kapovich was awarded a doctorate in 1988 at the Sobolev Institute of Mathematics in Novosibirsk with thesis advisor Samuel Leibovich Krushkal and thesis "Плоские конформные структуры на 3-многообразиях" (Flat conformal structures on 3-manifolds, Russian lang. thesis). Kapovich was a professor at University of California, Davis, beginning in 2003.

His research dealt with low-dimensional geometry and topology, Kleinian groups, hyperbolic geometry, geometric group theory, geometric representation theory in Lie groups, spaces of nonpositive curvature, and configuration spaces of arrangements and mechanical linkages.

In 2006, in Madrid, he was an Invited Speaker at the International Congress of Mathematicians with talk Generalized triangle inequalities and their applications.

He was married to mathematician Jennifer Schultens. He had two brothers, both of whom are mathematicians as well: Ilya Kapovich works in group theory and geometric topology at CUNY, and Vitali Kapovich researches global Riemannian geometry at the University of Toronto. His first cousin, Katia Kapovich is a prominent poet writing in Russian and English.

Kapovich died on June 16, 2026, at the age of 63.

== Selected publications ==
=== Articles ===
- On monodromy of complex projective structures. Invent. Math. 119 (1995), no. 1, 243–265. doi:10.1007/BF01245182
- with B. Leeb: On asymptotic cones and quasi-isometric classes of fundamental groups of 3-manifolds. Geom. Funct. Anal. 5 (1995), no. 3, 582–603. doi:10.1007/BF01895833
- with J. J. Millson: On the moduli space of polygons in the Euclidean plane. J. Differential Geom. 42 (1995), no. 1, 133–164.
- with J. J. Millson: The symplectic geometry of polygons in Euclidean space. J. Differential Geom. 44 (1996), no. 3, 479–513. doi:10.4310/jdg/1214459218
- with B. Leeb: Quasi-isometries preserve the geometric decomposition of Haken manifolds. Invent. Math. 128 (1997), no. 2, 393–416. doi:10.1007/s002220050145
- with J. J. Millson: On representation varieties of Artin groups, projective arrangements and the fundamental groups of smooth complex algebraic varieties. Inst. Hautes Études Sci. Publ. Math. 88 (1998), 5–95 (1999). doi:10.1007/BF02701766
- with D. Gallo, A. Marden: The monodromy groups of Schwarzian equations on closed Riemann surfaces. Ann. of Math. (2) 151 (2000), no. 2, 625–704.
- with B. Kleiner: Hyperbolic groups with low-dimensional boundary. Ann. Sci. Ecole Norm. Sup. (4) 33 (2000), no. 5, 647–669.
- with M. Bestvina, B. Kleiner: Van Kampen's embedding obstruction for discrete groups. Invent. Math. 150 (2002), no. 2, 219–235. doi:10.1007/s00222-002-0246-7
- Homological dimension and critical exponent of Kleinian groups. Geom. Funct. Anal. 18 (2009), no. 6, 2017–2054. doi:10.1007/s00039-009-0705-z
- Dirichlet fundamental domains and topology of projective varieties. Invent. Math. 194 (2013), no. 3, 631–672 doi:10.1007/s00222-013-0453-4
- with J. Kollár: Fundamental groups of links of isolated singularities. J. Amer. Math. Soc. 27 (2014), no. 4, 929–952. doi:10.1090/S0894-0347-2014-00807-9
- with B. Leeb, J. Porti: Anosov subgroups: Dynamical and geometric characterizations. Eur. J. Math. 3 (2017), 808–898. doi:10.1007/s40879-017-0192-y

=== Books ===
- Kapovich, Michael; Kapovich, Mikhail (2001). Hyperbolic manifolds and discrete groups. Springer. ISBN 978-0-8176-3904-4. Reprint of the 2001 edition. Modern Birkhäuser Classics. Birkhäuser Boston, Inc., Boston, MA, 2009. ISBN 978-0-8176-4912-8
- with Bernhard Leeb and John Millson: The generalized triangle inequalities in symmetric spaces and buildings with applications to algebra. Memoirs of the AMS, Volume 192, Number 896. American Mathematical Society. 2008. ISBN 978-0-8218-4054-2.
- with Cornelia Druţu: Geometric group theory. AMS Colloquium Publications, vol. 63. American Mathematical Society. 2018. ISBN 978-1-4704-1104-6.
- with Pranab Sardar: Trees of hyperbolic spaces. AMS Mathematical Surveys and Monographs, vol. 282. American Mathematical Society. 2024. ISBN 978-1-4704-7425-6.
