= Handle decomposition =

Manifold union

In mathematics, a handle decomposition of an m-manifold M is a union
$$\emptyset = M_{-1} \subset M_0 \subset M_1 \subset M_2 \subset \dots \subset M_{m-1} \subset M_m = M$$
where each $M_i$ is obtained from $M_{i-1}$ by the attaching of $i$-handles. A handle decomposition is to a manifold what a CW-decomposition is to a topological space—in many regards the purpose of a handle decomposition is to have a language analogous to CW-complexes, but adapted to the world of smooth manifolds. Thus an i-handle is the smooth analogue of an i-cell. Handle decompositions of manifolds arise naturally via Morse theory. The modification of handle structures is closely linked to Cerf theory.

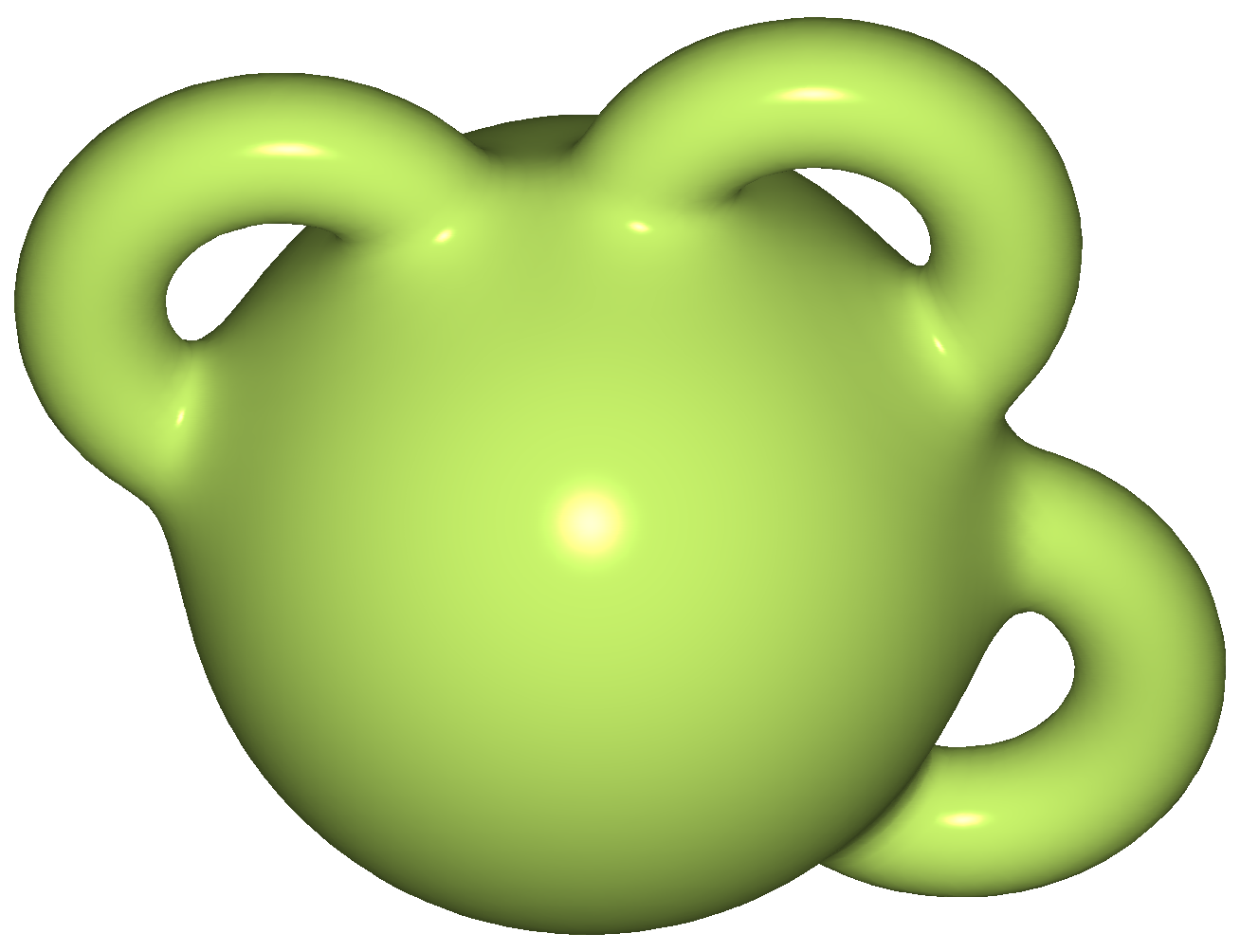
A 3-ball with three 1-handles attached.

== Motivation ==
Consider the standard CW-decomposition of the n-sphere, with one zero cell and a single n-cell. From the point of view of smooth manifolds, this is a degenerate decomposition of the sphere, as there is no natural way to see the smooth structure of $S^n$ from the eyes of this decomposition—in particular the smooth structure near the 0-cell depends on the behavior of the characteristic map $\chi : D^n \to S^n$ in a neighbourhood of $S^{n-1} \subset D^n$.

The problem with CW-decompositions is that the attaching maps for cells do not live in the world of smooth maps between manifolds. The germinal insight to correct this defect is the tubular neighbourhood theorem. Given a point p in an $m$-manifold M, its closed tubular neighbourhood $N_p$ is diffeomorphic to $D^m$, thus we have decomposed M into the disjoint union of $N_p$ and $M \setminus \operatorname{int}(N_p)$ glued along their common boundary. The vital issue here is that the gluing map is a diffeomorphism. Similarly, take a smooth embedded arc in $M \setminus \operatorname{int}(N_p)$, its tubular neighbourhood is diffeomorphic to $I \times D^{m-1}$. This allows us to write $M$ as the union of three manifolds, glued along parts of their boundaries:

(1) $D^m$,

(2) $I \times D^{m-1}$, and

(3) the complement of the open tubular neighbourhood of the arc in $M \setminus \operatorname{int}(N_p)$.

Notice all the gluing maps are smooth maps—in particular when we glue $I \times D^{m-1}$ to $D^m$ the equivalence relation is generated by the embedding of $(\partial I)\times D^{m-1}$ in $\partial D^m$, which is smooth by the tubular neighbourhood theorem.

Handle decompositions are an invention of Stephen Smale. In his original formulation, the process of attaching a j-handle to an m-manifold M assumes that one has a smooth embedding of $f : S^{j-1} \times D^{m-j} \to \partial M$. Let $H^j = D^j \times D^{m-j}$. The manifold $M \cup_f H^j$ (in words, M union a j-handle along f ) refers to the disjoint union of $M$ and $H^j$ with the identification of $S^{j-1} \times D^{m-j}$ with its image in $\partial M$, i.e.,
$$M \cup_f H^j = \left( M \sqcup (D^j \times D^{m-j}) \right) / \sim$$
where the equivalence relation $\sim$ is generated by $(p,x) \sim f(p,x)$ for all $(p,x) \in S^{j-1} \times D^{m-j} \subset D^j \times D^{m-j}$.

One says a manifold N is obtained from M by attaching j-handles if the union of M with finitely many j-handles is diffeomorphic to N. The definition of a handle decomposition is then as in the introduction. Thus, a manifold has a handle decomposition with only 0-handles if it is diffeomorphic to a disjoint union of balls. A connected manifold containing handles of only two types (i.e.: 0-handles and j-handles for some fixed j) is called a handlebody.

== Terminology ==
When forming M union a j-handle $H^j$
$$M \cup_f H^j = \left( M \sqcup (D^j \times D^{m-j}) \right) / \sim$$

$f(S^{j-1} \times \{0\}) \subset M$ is known as the attaching sphere.

$f$ is sometimes called the framing of the attaching sphere, since it gives trivialization of its normal bundle.

$\{0\}^j \times S^{m-j-1} \subset D^j \times D^{m-j} = H^j$ is the belt sphere of the handle $H^j$ in $M \cup_f H^j$.

A manifold obtained by attaching g k-handles to the disc $D^m$ is an (m,k)-handlebody of genus g .

== Cobordism presentations ==
A handle presentation of a cobordism consists of a cobordism W where $\partial W = M_0 \cup M_1$ and an ascending union
$$W_{-1} \subset W_0 \subset W_1 \subset \cdots \subset W_{m+1} = W$$
where M is m-dimensional, W is m+1-dimensional, $W_{-1}$ is diffeomorphic to $M_0 \times [0,1]$ and $W_i$ is obtained from $W_{i-1}$ by the attachment of i-handles. Whereas handle decompositions are the analogue for manifolds what cell decompositions are to topological spaces, handle presentations of cobordisms are to manifolds with boundary what relative cell decompositions are for pairs of spaces.

== Morse theoretic viewpoint ==
Given a Morse function $f : M \to \R$ on a compact boundaryless manifold M, such that the critical points $\{p_1, \ldots, p_k\} \subset M$ of f satisfy $f(p_1) < f(p_2) < \cdots < f(p_k)$, and provided
$$t_0 < f(p_1) < t_1 < f(p_2) < \cdots < t_{k-1} < f(p_k) < t_k ,$$
then for all j, $f^{-1}[t_{j-1},t_{j}]$ is diffeomorphic to $(f^{-1}(t_{j-1}) \times [0,1]) \cup H^{I(j)}$ where I(j) is the index of the critical point $p_{j}$. The index I(j) refers to the dimension of the maximal subspace of the tangent space $T_{p_j}M$ where the Hessian is negative definite.

Provided the indices satisfy $I(1) \leq I(2) \leq \cdots \leq I(k)$ this is a handle decomposition of M, moreover, every manifold has such Morse functions, so they have handle decompositions. Similarly, given a cobordism $W$ with $\partial W = M_0 \cup M_1$ and a function $f: W \to \R$ which is Morse on the interior and constant on the boundary and satisfying the increasing index property, there is an induced handle presentation of the cobordism W.

When f is a Morse function on M, -f is also a Morse function. The corresponding handle decomposition / presentation is called the dual decomposition.

== Some major theorems and observations ==
- A Heegaard splitting of a closed, orientable 3-manifold is a decomposition of a 3-manifold into the union of two (3,1)-handlebodies along their common boundary, called the Heegaard splitting surface. Heegaard splittings arise for 3-manifolds in several natural ways: given a handle decomposition of a 3-manifold, the union of the 0 and 1-handles is a (3,1)-handlebody, and the union of the 3 and 2-handles is also a (3,1)-handlebody (from the point of view of the dual decomposition), thus a Heegaard splitting. If the 3-manifold has a triangulation T, there is an induced Heegaard splitting where the first (3,1)-handlebody is a regular neighbourhood of the 1-skeleton $T^1$, and the other (3,1)-handlebody is a regular neighbourhood of the dual 1-skeleton.
- When attaching two handles in succession $(M \cup_f H^i) \cup_g H^j$, it is possible to switch the order of attachment, provided $j \leq i$, i.e.: this manifold is diffeomorphic to a manifold of the form $(M \cup H^j) \cup H^i$ for suitable attaching maps.
- The boundary of $M \cup_f H^j$ is diffeomorphic to $\partial M$ surgered along the framed sphere $f$. This is the primary link between surgery, handles and Morse functions.
- As a consequence, an m-manifold M is the boundary of an m+1-manifold W if and only if M can be obtained from $S^m$ by surgery on a collection of framed links in $S^m$. For example, it's known that every 3-manifold bounds a 4-manifold (similarly oriented and spin 3-manifolds bound oriented and spin 4-manifolds respectively) due to René Thom's work on cobordism. Thus every 3-manifold can be obtained via surgery on framed links in the 3-sphere. In the oriented case, it's conventional to reduce this framed link to a framed embedding of a disjoint union of circles.
- The H-cobordism theorem is proven by simplifying handle decompositions of smooth manifolds.

== See also ==
- Casson handle
- Cobordism theory
- CW complex
- Handlebody
- Kirby calculus
- Manifold decomposition
