= Ilya Kapovich =

Russian-American mathematician

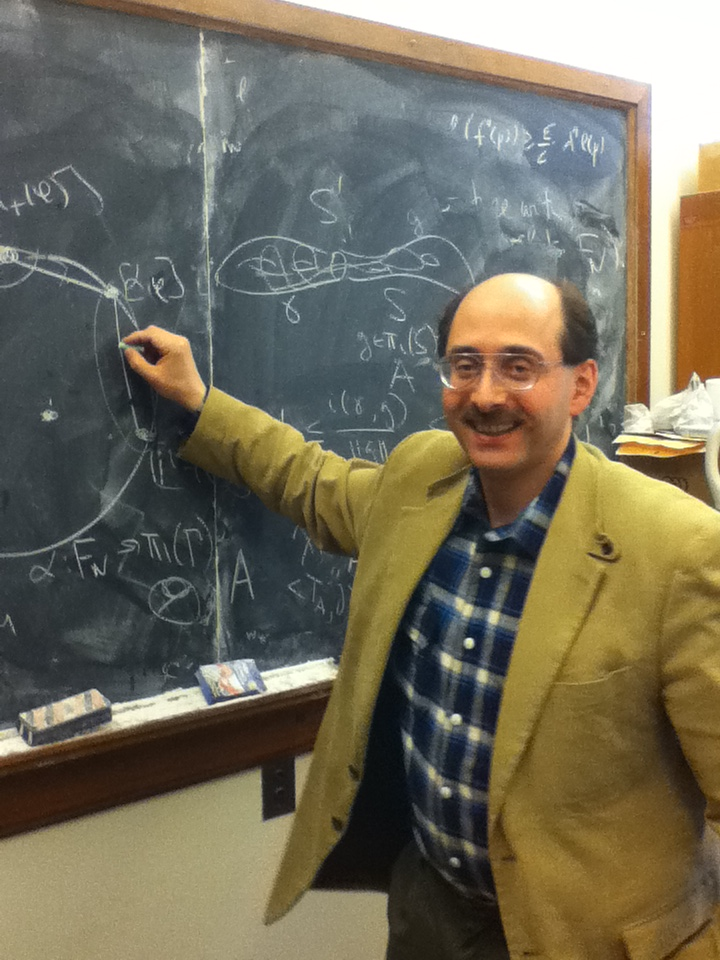
- Ilya Kapovich in 2012
- Education: Novosibirsk State University; City University of New York
- Scientific career
- Fields: Mathematics
- Workplaces: University of Illinois Urbana-Champaign; Hunter College
- Doctoral advisor: Gilbert Baumslag

Ilya Kapovich is a Russian-American mathematician and a Professor of Mathematics at the Hunter College of the City University of New York. He is known for his contributions to geometric group theory, geometric topology, and complexity theory.

== Career ==
He received his Doctor of Philosophy from the Graduate Center of the City University of New York in 1996 under the direction of Gilbert Baumslag. After postdoc positions at Rutgers University and Hebrew University, he worked at the University of Illinois Urbana-Champaign from 2000 to 2018. While at Illinois, he has had several visiting positions. Most notably, he was an Alexander von Humboldt Foundation research fellow at Frankfurt University during Spring 2006, and Ada Peluso Visiting Professor at Hunter College during Spring 2017.

== Recognition ==
In 2012, he was named an inaugural fellow of the American Mathematical Society. He delivered an invited address at 2008 Spring Eastern Sectional meeting of the AMS.

== Contributions ==
He has worked on problems related to automorphisms of free groups, free-by-cyclic groups, mapping class groups as well as complexity and decision problems in group theory. He has supervised 9 PhD students to completion as of 2022.

Between 2010 and 2015, he served on the editorial board of the LMS Journal of Mathematics and Computation.

His older brother Michael Kapovich was a professor of mathematics at the University of California, Davis, and his twin brother Vitali Kapovitch is a professor of mathematics at the University of Toronto.

=== Selected publications ===
- Kapovich, Ilya; Myasnikov, Alexei (2002). "Stallings Foldings and Subgroups of Free Groups". Journal of Algebra. 248 (2): 608–668. doi:10.1006/jabr.2001.9033.
- Kapovich, Ilya; Myasnikov, Alexei; Schupp, Paul; Shpilrain, Vladimir (2003). "Generic-case complexity, decision problems in group theory, and random walks". Journal of Algebra. 264 (2): 665–694. arXiv:math/0203239. doi:10.1016/S0021-8693(03)00167-4.
- Kapovich, Ilya; Myasnikov, Alexei; Schupp, Paul; Shpilrain, Vladimir (2005). "Average-case complexity and decision problems in group theory". Advances in Mathematics. 190 (2): 343–359. arXiv:math/0206273. doi:10.1016/j.aim.2003.02.001.
