= Lamination (topology) =

Partitioned topological space

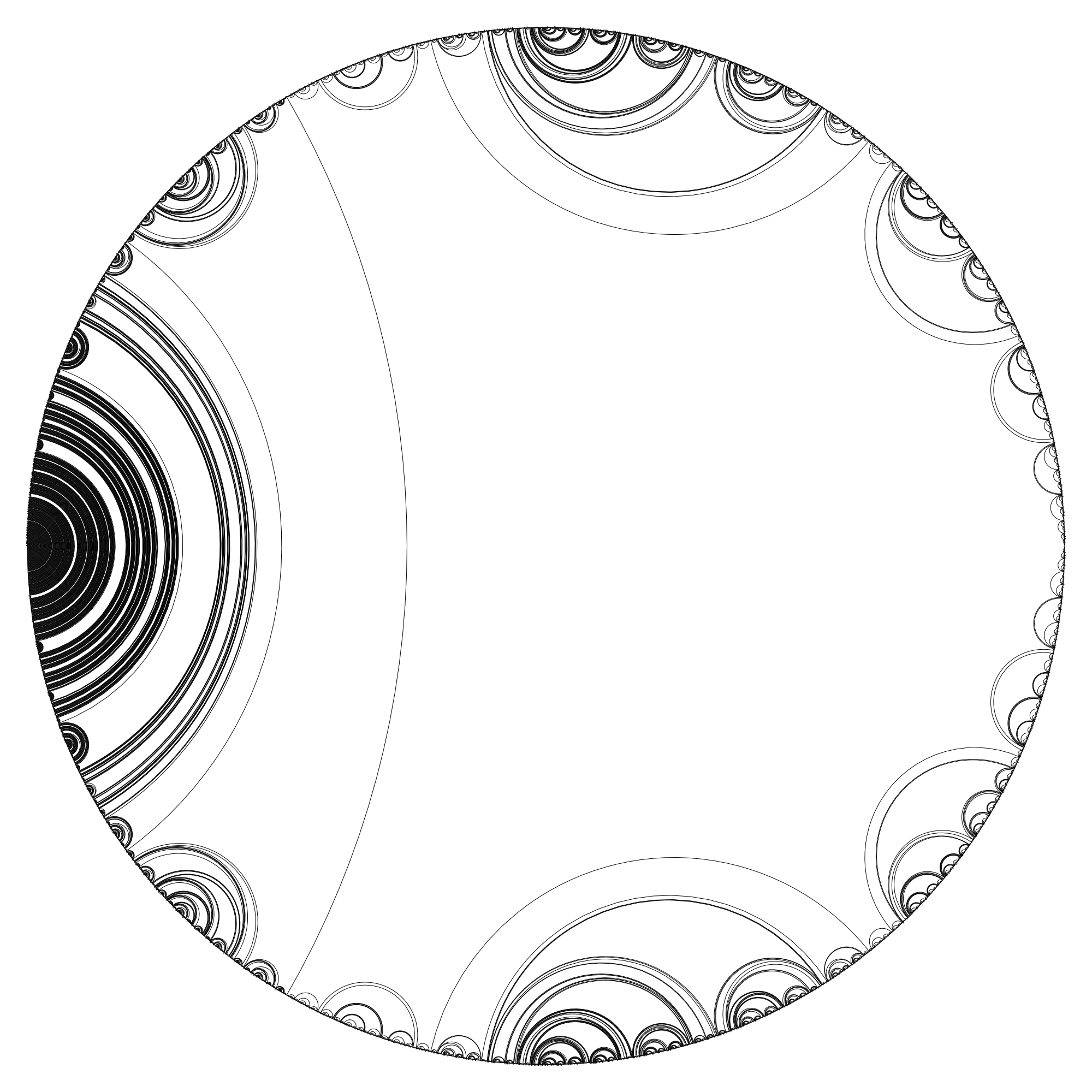
Lamination associated with Mandelbrot set

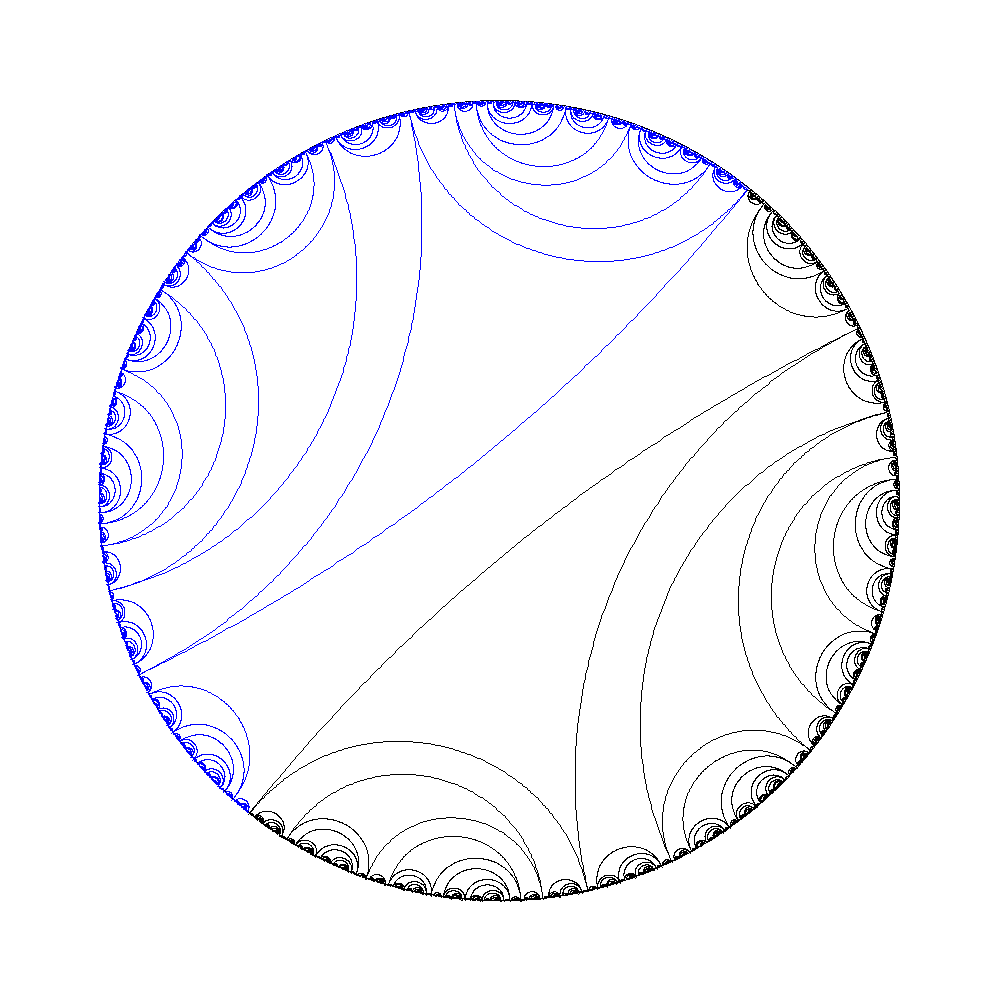
Lamination of rabbit Julia set

In topology, a branch of mathematics, a lamination is a :

- "topological space partitioned into subsets"
- decoration (a structure or property at a point) of a manifold in which some subset of the manifold is partitioned into sheets of some lower dimension, and the sheets are locally parallel.

A lamination of a surface is a partition of a closed subset of the surface into smooth curves.

It may or may not be possible to fill the gaps in a lamination to make a foliation.

== Examples ==
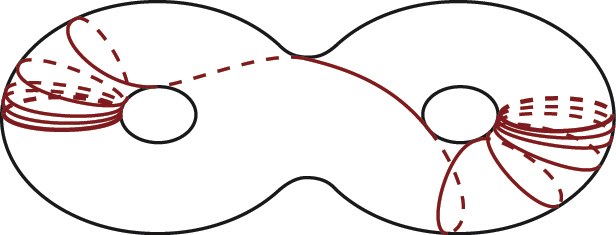
Geodesic lamination of a closed surface

- A geodesic lamination of a 2-dimensional hyperbolic manifold is a closed subset together with a foliation of this closed subset by geodesics. These are used in Thurston's classification of elements of the mapping class group and in his theory of earthquake maps.
- Quadratic laminations, which remain invariant under the angle doubling map. These laminations are associated with quadratic maps. It is a closed collection of chords in the unit disc. It is also a topological model of Mandelbrot or Julia set.

== See also ==
- Train track (mathematics)
- Orbit portrait

== Bibliography ==
- Conformal Laminations Thesis by Vineet Gupta, California Institute of Technology Pasadena, California 2004
