= Low-dimensional topology =

Branch of topology

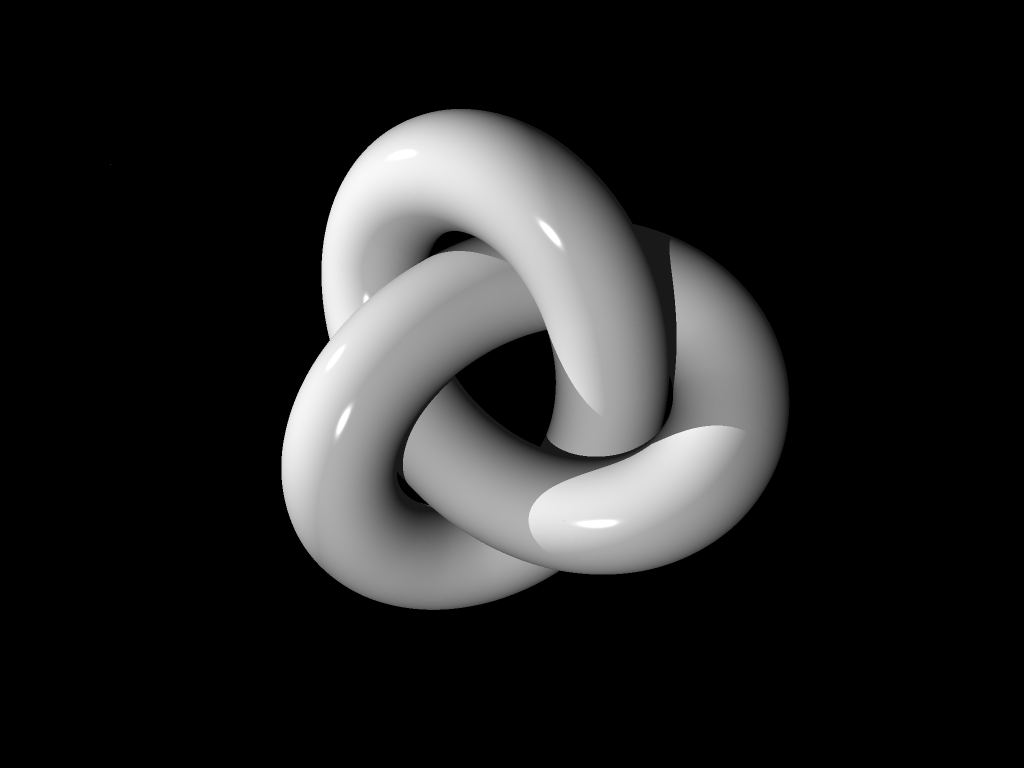
A three-dimensional depiction of a thickened trefoil knot, the simplest non-trivial knot. Knot theory is an important part of low-dimensional topology.

In mathematics, low-dimensional topology is the branch of topology that studies manifolds, or more generally topological spaces, of four or fewer dimensions. Representative topics are the theory of 3-manifolds and 4-manifolds, knot theory, and braid groups. This can be regarded as a part of geometric topology. It may also be used to refer to the study of topological spaces of dimension 1, though this is more typically considered part of continuum theory.

== History ==
A number of advances starting in the 1960s had the effect of emphasising low dimensions in topology. The solution by Stephen Smale, in 1961, of the Poincaré conjecture in five or more dimensions made dimensions three and four seem the hardest; and indeed they required new methods, while the freedom of higher dimensions meant that questions could be reduced to computational methods available in surgery theory. Thurston's geometrization conjecture, formulated in the late 1970s, offered a framework that suggested geometry and topology were closely intertwined in low dimensions, and Thurston's proof of geometrization for Haken manifolds utilized a variety of tools from previously only weakly linked areas of mathematics. Vaughan Jones' discovery of the Jones polynomial in the early 1980s not only led knot theory in new directions but gave rise to still mysterious connections between low-dimensional topology and mathematical physics. In 2002, Grigori Perelman announced a proof of the three-dimensional Poincaré conjecture, using Richard S. Hamilton's Ricci flow, an idea belonging to the field of geometric analysis.

Overall, this progress has led to better integration of the field into the rest of mathematics.

== Two dimensions ==
A surface is a two-dimensional, topological manifold. The most familiar examples are those that arise as the boundaries of solid objects in ordinary three-dimensional Euclidean space R^{3}—for example, the surface of a ball. On the other hand, there are surfaces, such as the Klein bottle, that cannot be embedded in three-dimensional Euclidean space without introducing singularities or self-intersections.

=== Classification of surfaces ===
The classification theorem of closed surfaces states that any connected closed surface is homeomorphic to some member of one of these three families:

1. the sphere;
2. the connected sum of g tori, for $g \geq 1$;
3. the connected sum of k real projective planes, for $k \geq 1$.

The surfaces in the first two families are orientable. It is convenient to combine the two families by regarding the sphere as the connected sum of 0 tori. The number g of tori involved is called the genus of the surface. The sphere and the torus have Euler characteristics 2 and 0, respectively, and in general the Euler characteristic of the connected sum of g tori is 2 − 2g.

The surfaces in the third family are nonorientable. The Euler characteristic of the real projective plane is 1, and in general the Euler characteristic of the connected sum of k of them is 2 − k.

=== Teichmüller space ===
In mathematics, the Teichmüller space T_{X} of a (real) topological surface X, is a space that parameterizes complex structures on X up to the action of homeomorphisms that are isotopic to the identity homeomorphism. Each point in T_{X} may be regarded as an isomorphism class of 'marked' Riemann surfaces where a 'marking' is an isotopy class of homeomorphisms from X to X. The Teichmüller space is the universal covering orbifold of the (Riemann) moduli space.

Teichmüller space has a canonical complex manifold structure and a wealth of natural metrics. The underlying topological space of Teichmüller space was studied by Fricke, and the Teichmüller metric on it was introduced by Oswald Teichmüller (1940).

=== Uniformization theorem ===
In mathematics, the uniformization theorem says that every simply connected Riemann surface is conformally equivalent to one of the three domains: the open unit disk, the complex plane, or the Riemann sphere. In particular it admits a Riemannian metric of constant curvature. This classifies Riemannian surfaces as elliptic (positively curved—rather, admitting a constant positively curved metric), parabolic (flat), and hyperbolic (negatively curved) according to their universal cover.

The uniformization theorem is a generalization of the Riemann mapping theorem from proper simply connected open subsets of the plane to arbitrary simply connected Riemann surfaces.

== Three dimensions ==
A topological space X is a 3-manifold if every point in X has a neighbourhood that is homeomorphic to Euclidean 3-space.

The topological, piecewise-linear, and smooth categories are all equivalent in three dimensions, so little distinction is made in whether we are dealing with say, topological 3-manifolds, or smooth 3-manifolds.

Phenomena in three dimensions can be strikingly different from phenomena in other dimensions, and so there is a prevalence of very specialized techniques that do not generalize to dimensions greater than three. This special role has led to the discovery of close connections to a diversity of other fields, such as knot theory, geometric group theory, hyperbolic geometry, number theory, Teichmüller theory, topological quantum field theory, gauge theory, Floer homology, and partial differential equations. 3-manifold theory is considered a part of low-dimensional topology or geometric topology.

=== Knot and braid theory ===
Knot theory is the study of mathematical knots. While inspired by knots that appear in daily life in shoelaces and rope, a mathematician's knot differs in that the ends are joined so that it cannot be undone. In mathematical language, a knot is an embedding of a circle in 3-dimensional Euclidean space, R^{3} (since we're using topology, a circle isn't bound to the classical geometric concept, but to all of its homeomorphisms). Two mathematical knots are equivalent if one can be transformed into the other via a deformation of R^{3} upon itself (known as an ambient isotopy); these transformations correspond to manipulations of a knotted string that do not involve cutting the string or passing the string through itself.

Knot complements are frequently-studied 3-manifolds. The knot complement of a tame knot K is the three-dimensional space surrounding the knot. To make this precise, suppose that K is a knot in a three-manifold M (most often, M is the 3-sphere). Let N be a tubular neighborhood of K; so N is a solid torus. The knot complement is then the complement of N,

$$X_K = M - \mbox{interior}(N).$$

A related topic is braid theory. Braid theory is an abstract geometric theory studying the everyday braid concept, and some generalizations. The idea is that braids can be organized into groups, in which the group operation is 'do the first braid on a set of strings, and then follow it with a second on the twisted strings'. Such groups may be described by explicit presentations, as was shown by Emil Artin (1947). For an elementary treatment along these lines, see the article on braid groups. Braid groups may also be given a deeper mathematical interpretation: as the fundamental group of certain configuration spaces.

=== Hyperbolic 3-manifolds ===
A hyperbolic 3-manifold is a 3-manifold equipped with a complete Riemannian metric of constant sectional curvature -1. In other words, it is the quotient of three-dimensional hyperbolic space by a subgroup of hyperbolic isometries acting freely and properly discontinuously. See also Kleinian model.

Its thick-thin decomposition has a thin part consisting of tubular neighborhoods of closed geodesics and/or ends that are the product of a Euclidean surface and the closed half-ray. The manifold is of finite volume if and only if its thick part is compact. In this case, the ends are of the form torus cross the closed half-ray and are called cusps. Knot complements are the most commonly studied cusped manifolds.

=== Poincaré conjecture and geometrization ===
Thurston's geometrization conjecture states that certain three-dimensional topological spaces each have a unique geometric structure that can be associated with them. It is an analogue of the uniformization theorem for two-dimensional surfaces, which states that every simply-connected Riemann surface can be given one of three geometries (Euclidean, spherical, or hyperbolic). In three dimensions, it is not always possible to assign a single geometry to a whole topological space. Instead, the geometrization conjecture states that every closed 3-manifold can be decomposed in a canonical way into pieces that each have one of eight types of geometric structure. The conjecture was proposed by William Thurston (1982), and implies several other conjectures, such as the Poincaré conjecture and Thurston's elliptization conjecture.

== Four dimensions ==
A 4-manifold is a 4-dimensional topological manifold. A smooth 4-manifold is a 4-manifold with a smooth structure. In dimension four, in marked contrast with lower dimensions, topological and smooth manifolds are quite different. There exist some topological 4-manifolds that admit no smooth structure and even if there exists a smooth structure it need not be unique (i.e. there are smooth 4-manifolds that are homeomorphic but not diffeomorphic).

4-manifolds are of importance in physics because, in General Relativity, spacetime is modeled as a pseudo-Riemannian 4-manifold.

=== Exotic R^{4} ===
An exotic R^{4} is a differentiable manifold that is homeomorphic but not diffeomorphic to the Euclidean space R^{4}. The first examples were found in the early 1980s by Michael Freedman, by using the contrast between Freedman's theorems about topological 4-manifolds, and Simon Donaldson's theorems about smooth 4-manifolds. There is a continuum of non-diffeomorphic differentiable structures of R^{4}, as was shown first by Clifford Taubes.

Prior to this construction, non-diffeomorphic smooth structures on spheres—exotic spheres—were already known to exist, although the question of the existence of such structures for the particular case of the 4-sphere remained open (and still remains open to this day). For any positive integer n other than 4, there are no exotic smooth structures on R^{n}; in other words, if n ≠ 4 then any smooth manifold homeomorphic to R^{n} is diffeomorphic to R^{n}.

=== Other special phenomena in four dimensions ===
There are several fundamental theorems about manifolds that can be proved by low-dimensional methods in dimensions at most 3, and by completely different high-dimensional methods in dimension at least 5, but which are false in four dimensions. Here are some examples:

- In dimensions other than 4, the Kirby–Siebenmann invariant provides the obstruction to the existence of a PL structure; in other words a compact topological manifold has a PL structure if and only if its Kirby–Siebenmann invariant in H^{4}(M,Z/2Z) vanishes. In dimension 3 and lower, every topological manifold admits an essentially unique PL structure. In dimension 4 there are many examples with vanishing Kirby–Siebenmann invariant but no PL structure.
- In any dimension other than 4, a compact topological manifold has only a finite number of essentially distinct PL or smooth structures. In dimension 4, compact manifolds can have a countable infinite number of non-diffeomorphic smooth structures.
- Four is the only dimension n for which R^{n} can have an exotic smooth structure. R^{4} has an uncountable number of exotic smooth structures; see exotic R^{4}.
- The solution to the smooth Poincaré conjecture is known in all dimensions other than 4 (it is usually false in dimensions at least 7; see exotic sphere). The Poincaré conjecture for PL manifolds has been proved for all dimensions other than 4, but it is not known whether it is true in 4 dimensions (it is equivalent to the smooth Poincaré conjecture in 4 dimensions).
- The smooth h-cobordism theorem holds for cobordisms provided that neither the cobordism nor its boundary has dimension 4. It can fail if the boundary of the cobordism has dimension 4 (as shown by Donaldson). If the cobordism has dimension 4, then it is unknown whether the h-cobordism theorem holds.
- A topological manifold of dimension not equal to 4 has a handlebody decomposition. Manifolds of dimension 4 have a handlebody decomposition if and only if they are smoothable.
- There are compact 4-dimensional topological manifolds that are not homeomorphic to any simplicial complex. In dimension at least 5 the existence of topological manifolds not homeomorphic to a simplicial complex was an open problem. In 2013, Ciprian Manolescu posted a preprint on ArXiv showing that there are manifolds in each dimension greater than or equal to 5, that are not homeomorphic to a simplicial complex.

== A few typical theorems that distinguish low-dimensional topology ==
There are several theorems that in effect state that many of the most basic tools used to study high-dimensional manifolds do not apply to low-dimensional manifolds, such as:

Steenrod's theorem states that an orientable 3-manifold has a trivial tangent bundle. Stated another way, the only characteristic class of a 3-manifold is the obstruction to orientability.

Any closed 3-manifold is the boundary of a 4-manifold. This theorem is due independently to several people: it follows from the Dehn–Lickorish theorem via a Heegaard splitting of the 3-manifold. It also follows from René Thom's computation of the cobordism ring of closed manifolds.

The existence of exotic smooth structures on R^{4}. This was originally observed by Michael Freedman, based on the work of Simon Donaldson and Andrew Casson. It has since been elaborated by Freedman, Robert Gompf, Clifford Taubes and Laurence Taylor to show there exists a continuum of non-diffeomorphic smooth structures on R^{4}. Meanwhile, R^{n} is known to have exactly one smooth structure up to diffeomorphism provided n ≠ 4.

== See also ==
- List of geometric topology topics
