= Train track (mathematics) =

A train track on a triple torus.

In the mathematical area of topology, a train track is a family of curves embedded on a surface, meeting the following conditions:

1. The curves meet at a finite set of vertices called switches.
2. Away from the switches, the curves are smooth and do not touch each other.
3. At each switch, three curves meet with the same tangent line, with two curves entering from one direction and one from the other.

The main application of train tracks in mathematics is to study laminations of surfaces, that is, partitions of closed subsets of surfaces into unions of smooth curves. Train tracks have also been used in graph drawing.

== Train tracks and laminations ==
A switch in a train track, and the corresponding portion of a lamination.

A lamination of a surface is a partition of a closed subset of the surface into smooth curves. The study of train tracks was originally motivated by the following observation: If a generic lamination on a surface is looked at from a distance by a myopic person, it will look like a train track.

A switch in a train track models a point where two families of parallel curves in the lamination merge to become a single family, as shown in the illustration. Although the switch consists of three curves ending in and intersecting at a single point, the curves in the lamination do not have endpoints and do not intersect each other.

For this application of train tracks to laminations, it is often important to constrain the shapes that can be formed by connected components of the surface between the curves of the track. For instance, Penner and Harer require that each such component, when glued to a copy of itself along its boundary to form a smooth surface with cusps, have negative cusped Euler characteristic.

A train track with weights, or weighted train track or measured train track, consists of a train track with a non-negative real number, called a weight, assigned to each branch. The weights can be used to model which of the curves in a parallel family of curves from a lamination are split to which sides of the switch. Weights must satisfy the following switch condition: The weight assigned to the ingoing branch at a switch should equal the sum of the weights assigned to the branches outgoing from that switch. Weights are closely related to the notion of carrying. A train track is said to carry a lamination if there is a train track neighborhood such that every leaf of the lamination is contained in the neighborhood and intersects each vertical fiber transversely. If each vertical fiber has nontrivial intersection with some leaf, then the lamination is fully carried by the train track.
