= Heegaard splitting =

Decomposition of a compact oriented 3-manifold by dividing it into two handlebodies

In the mathematical field of geometric topology, a Heegaard splitting (Danish: [ˈhe̝ˀˌkɒˀ]) is a decomposition of a compact oriented 3-manifold that results from dividing it into two handlebodies.

== Definitions ==
Let V and W be handlebodies of genus g, and let ƒ be an orientation reversing homeomorphism from the boundary of V to the boundary of W. By gluing V to W along ƒ we obtain the compact oriented 3-manifold

$$M = V \cup_f W.$$

Every closed, orientable three-manifold may be so obtained; this follows from deep results on the triangulability of three-manifolds due to Moise. This contrasts strongly with higher-dimensional manifolds which need not admit smooth or piecewise linear structures. Assuming smoothness the existence of a Heegaard splitting also follows from the work of Smale about handle decompositions from Morse theory.

The decomposition of M into two handlebodies is called a Heegaard splitting, and their common boundary H is called the Heegaard surface of the splitting. Splittings are considered up to isotopy.

The gluing map ƒ need only be specified up to taking a double coset in the mapping class group of H. This connection with the mapping class group was first made by W. B. R. Lickorish.

Heegaard splittings can also be defined for compact 3-manifolds with boundary by replacing handlebodies with compression bodies. The gluing map is between the positive boundaries of the compression bodies.

A closed curve is called essential if it is not homotopic to a point, a puncture, or a boundary component.

A Heegaard splitting is reducible if there is an essential simple closed curve $\alpha$ on H which bounds a disk in both V and in W. A splitting is irreducible if it is not reducible. It follows from Haken's Lemma that in a reducible manifold every splitting is reducible.

A Heegaard splitting is stabilized if there are essential simple closed curves $\alpha$ and $\beta$ on H where $\alpha$ bounds a disk in V, $\beta$ bounds a disk in W, and $\alpha$ and $\beta$ intersect exactly once. It follows from Waldhausen's Theorem that every reducible splitting of an irreducible manifold is stabilized.

A Heegaard splitting is weakly reducible if there are disjoint essential simple closed curves $\alpha$ and $\beta$ on H where $\alpha$ bounds a disk in V and $\beta$ bounds a disk in W. A splitting is strongly irreducible if it is not weakly reducible.

A Heegaard splitting is minimal or minimal genus if there is no other splitting of the ambient three-manifold of lower genus. The minimal value g of the splitting surface is the Heegaard genus of M.

=== Generalized Heegaard splittings ===
A generalized Heegaard splitting of M is a decomposition into compression bodies $V_i, W_i, i = 1, \dotsc, n$ and surfaces $H_i, i = 1, \dotsc, n$ such that $\partial_+ V_i = \partial_+ W_i = H_i$ and $\partial_- W_i = \partial_- V_{i+1}$. The interiors of the compression bodies must be pairwise disjoint and their union must be all of $M$. The surface $H_i$ forms a Heegaard surface for the submanifold $V_i \cup W_i$ of $M$. (Note that here each V_{i} and W_{i} is allowed to have more than one component.)

A generalized Heegaard splitting is called strongly irreducible if each $V_i \cup W_i$ is strongly irreducible.

There is an analogous notion of thin position, defined for knots, for Heegaard splittings. The complexity of a connected surface S, c(S), is defined to be $\operatorname{max}\left\{0, 1 - \chi(S)\right\}$; the complexity of a disconnected surface is the sum of complexities of its components. The complexity of a generalized Heegaard splitting is the multi-set $\{c(S_i)\}$, where the index runs over the Heegaard surfaces in the generalized splitting. These multi-sets can be well-ordered by lexicographical ordering (monotonically decreasing). A generalized Heegaard splitting is thin if its complexity is minimal.

== Examples ==
Three-sphere
The three-sphere $S^3$ is the set of vectors in $\mathbb{R}^4$ with length one. Intersecting this with the $xyz$ hyperplane gives a two-sphere. This is the standard genus zero splitting of $S^3$. Conversely, by Alexander's Trick, all manifolds admitting a genus zero splitting are homeomorphic to $S^3$.
Under the usual identification of $\mathbb{R}^4$ with $\mathbb{C}^2$ we may view $S^3$ as living in $\mathbb{C}^2$. Then the set of points where each coordinate has norm $1/\sqrt{2}$ forms a Clifford torus, $T^2$. This is the standard genus one splitting of $S^3$. (See also the discussion at Hopf bundle.)
Stabilization
Given a Heegaard splitting H in M the stabilization of H is formed by taking the connected sum of the pair $(M, H)$ with the pair $\left(S^3, T^2\right)$. It is easy to show that the stabilization procedure yields stabilized splittings. Inductively, a splitting is standard if it is the stabilization of a standard splitting.
Lens spaces
All have a standard splitting of genus one. This is the image of the Clifford torus in $S^3$ under the quotient map used to define the lens space in question. It follows from the structure of the mapping class group of the two-torus that only lens spaces have splittings of genus one.
Three-torus
Recall that the three-torus $T^3$ is the Cartesian product of three copies of $S^1$ (circles). Let $x_0$ be a point of $S^1$ and consider the graph $\Gamma = S^1 \times \{x_0\} \times \{x_0\} \cup \{x_0\} \times S^1 \times \{x_0\} \cup \{x_0\} \times \{x_0\} \times S^1$. It is an easy exercise to show that V, a regular neighborhood of $\Gamma$, is a handlebody as is $T^3 - V$. Thus the boundary of V in $T^3$ is a Heegaard splitting and this is the standard splitting of $T^3$. It was proved by Charles Frohman and Joel Hass that any other genus 3 Heegaard splitting of the three-torus is topologically equivalent to this one. Michel Boileau and Jean-Pierre Otal proved that in general any Heegaard splitting of the three-torus is equivalent to the result of stabilizing this example.

== Theorems ==
Alexander's lemma
Up to isotopy, there is a unique (piecewise linear) embedding of the two-sphere into the three-sphere. (In higher dimensions this is known as the Schoenflies theorem. In dimension two this is the Jordan curve theorem.) This may be restated as follows: the genus zero splitting of $S^3$ is unique.
Waldhausen's theorem
Every splitting of $S^3$ is obtained by stabilizing the unique splitting of genus zero.

Suppose now that M is a closed orientable three-manifold.

Reidemeister–Singer theorem
For any pair of splittings $H_1$ and $H_2$ in M there is a third splitting $H$ in M which is a stabilization of both.
Haken's lemma
Suppose that $S_1$ is an essential two-sphere in M and H is a Heegaard splitting. Then there is an essential two-sphere $S_2$ in M meeting H in a single curve.

== Classifications ==
There are several classes of three-manifolds where the set of Heegaard splittings is completely known. For example, Waldhausen's Theorem shows that all splittings of $S^3$ are standard. The same holds for lens spaces (as proved by Francis Bonahon and Otal).

Splittings of Seifert fiber spaces are more subtle. Here, all splittings may be isotoped to be vertical or horizontal (as proved by Yoav Moriah and Jennifer Schultens).

Cooper & Scharlemann (1999) classified splittings of torus bundles (which includes all three-manifolds with Sol geometry). It follows from their work that all torus bundles have a unique splitting of minimal genus. All other splittings of the torus bundle are stabilizations of the minimal genus one.

A paper of Kobayashi (2001) classifies the Heegaard splittings of hyperbolic three-manifolds which are two-bridge knot complements.

Computational methods can be used to determine or approximate the Heegaard genus of a 3-manifold. John Berge's software Heegaard studies Heegaard splittings generated by the fundamental group of a manifold.

== Applications and connections ==
=== Minimal surfaces ===
Heegaard splittings appeared in the theory of minimal surfaces first in the work of Blaine Lawson who proved that embedded minimal surfaces in compact manifolds of positive sectional curvature are Heegaard splittings. This result was extended by William Meeks to flat manifolds, except he proves that an embedded minimal surface in a flat three-manifold is either a Heegaard surface or totally geodesic.

Meeks and Shing-Tung Yau went on to use results of Waldhausen to prove results about the topological uniqueness of minimal surfaces of finite genus in $\R^3$. The final topological classification of embedded minimal surfaces in $\R^3$ was given by Meeks and Frohman. The result relied heavily on techniques developed for studying the topology of Heegaard splittings.

=== Heegaard Floer homology ===
Heegaard diagrams, which are simple combinatorial descriptions of Heegaard splittings, have been used extensively to construct invariants of three-manifolds. The most recent example of this is the Heegaard Floer homology of Peter Ozsvath and Zoltán Szabó. The theory uses the $g^{th}$ symmetric product of a Heegaard surface as the ambient space, and tori built from the boundaries of meridian disks for the two handlebodies as the Lagrangian submanifolds.

== History ==
The idea of a Heegaard splitting was introduced by Poul Heegaard (1898). While Heegaard splittings were studied extensively by mathematicians such as Wolfgang Haken and Friedhelm Waldhausen in the 1960s, it was not until a few decades later that the field was rejuvenated by Andrew Casson and Cameron Gordon (1987), primarily through their concept of strong irreducibility.

== See also ==
- Manifold decomposition
- Handle decompositions of 3-manifolds
- Compression body
