= Handlebody =

Decomposition of a manifold into standard pieces

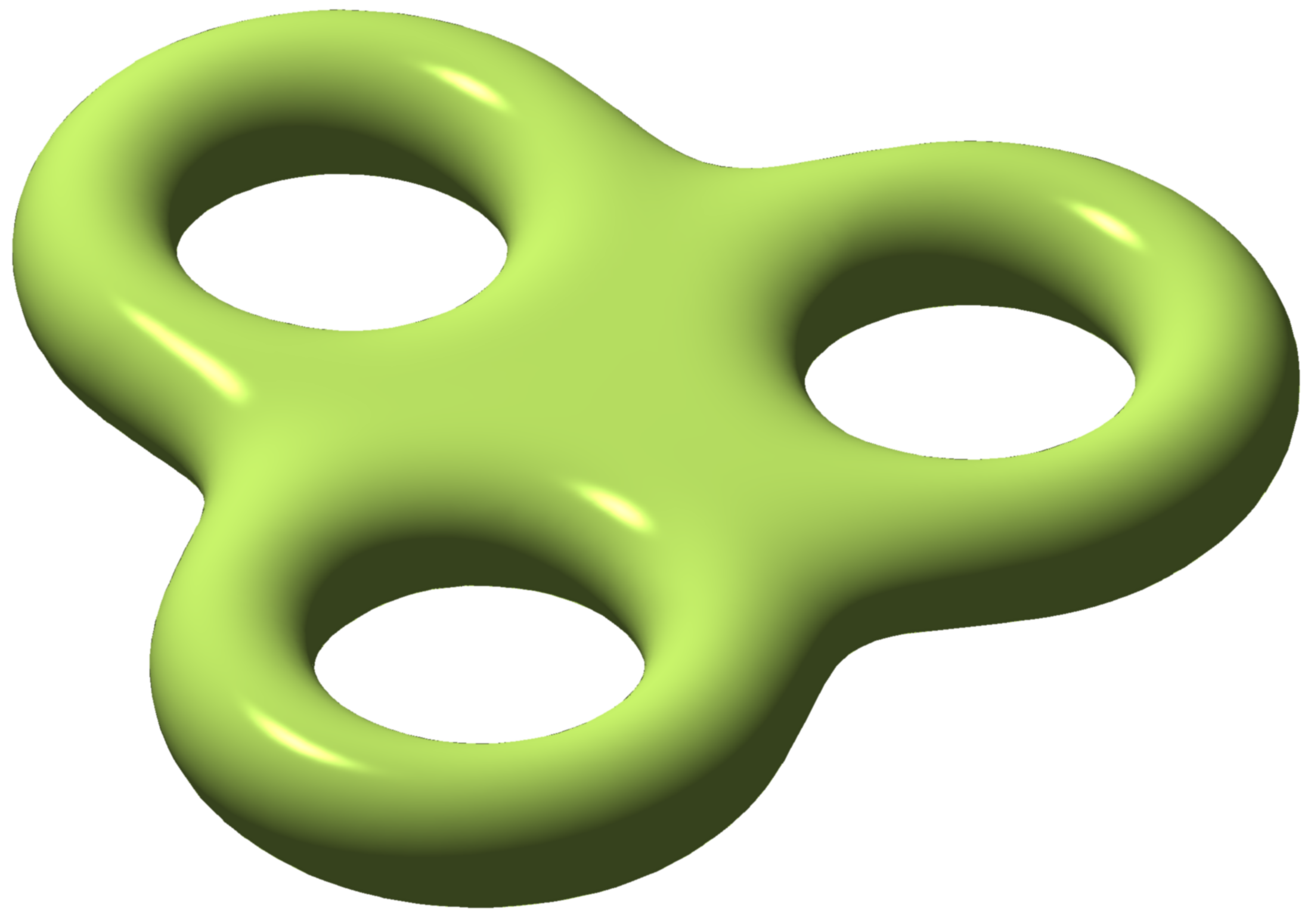
A genus three handlebody.

In the mathematical field of geometric topology, a handlebody is a decomposition of a manifold into standard pieces. Handlebodies play an important role in Morse theory, cobordism theory and the surgery theory of high-dimensional manifolds. Handles are used to particularly study 3-manifolds.

Handlebodies play a similar role in the study of manifolds as simplicial complexes and CW complexes play in homotopy theory, allowing one to analyze a space in terms of individual pieces and their interactions.

== n-dimensional handlebodies ==
If $(W,\partial W)$ is an $n$-dimensional manifold with boundary, and

$$S^{r-1} \times D^{n-r} \subset \partial W$$

(where $S^{n}$ represents an n-sphere and $D^n$ is an n-ball) is an embedding, the $n$-dimensional manifold with boundary

$$(W',\partial W') = ((W \cup( D^r \times D^{n-r})),(\partial W - S^{r-1} \times D^{n-r})\cup (D^r \times S^{n-r-1}))$$

is said to be obtained from

$$(W,\partial W)$$

by attaching an $r$-handle. The boundary $\partial W'$ is obtained from $\partial W$ by surgery. As trivial examples, note that attaching a 0-handle is just taking a disjoint union with a ball, and that attaching an n-handle to $(W,\partial W)$ is gluing in a ball along any sphere component of $\partial W$. Morse theory was used by René Thom and John Milnor to prove that every manifold (with or without boundary) is a handlebody, meaning that it has an expression as a union of handles. The expression is non-unique: the manipulation of handlebody decompositions is an essential ingredient of the proof of the Smale h-cobordism theorem, and its generalization to the s-cobordism theorem. A manifold is called a "k-handlebody" if it is the union of r-handles, for r at most k. This is not the same as the dimension of the manifold. For instance, a 4-dimensional 2-handlebody is a union of 0-handles, 1-handles and 2-handles. Any manifold is an n-handlebody, that is, any manifold is the union of handles. It isn't too hard to see that a manifold is an (n-1)-handlebody if and only if it has non-empty boundary. Any handlebody decomposition of a manifold defines a CW complex decomposition of the manifold, since attaching an r-handle is the same, up to homotopy equivalence, as attaching an r-cell. However, a handlebody decomposition gives more information than just the homotopy type of the manifold. For instance, a handlebody decomposition completely describes the manifold up to homeomorphism. In dimension four, they even describe the smooth structure, as long as the attaching maps are smooth. This is false in higher dimensions; any exotic sphere is the union of a 0-handle and an n-handle.

== 3-dimensional handlebodies ==
A handlebody can be defined as an orientable 3-manifold-with-boundary containing pairwise disjoint, properly embedded 2-discs such that the manifold resulting from cutting along the discs is a 3-ball. It's instructive to imagine how to reverse this process to get a handlebody. (Sometimes the orientability hypothesis is dropped from this last definition, and one gets a more general kind of handlebody with a non-orientable handle.)

The genus of a handlebody is the genus of its boundary surface. Up to homeomorphism, there is exactly one handlebody of any non-negative integer genus.

The importance of handlebodies in 3-manifold theory comes from their connection with Heegaard splittings. The importance of handlebodies in geometric group theory comes from the fact that their fundamental group is free.

A 3-dimensional handlebody is sometimes, particularly in older literature, referred to as a cube with handles.

== Examples ==
Let G be a connected finite graph embedded in Euclidean space of dimension n. Let V be a closed regular neighborhood of G in the Euclidean space. Then V is an n-dimensional handlebody. The graph G is called a spine of V.

Any genus zero handlebody is homeomorphic to the three-ball B^{3}. A genus one handlebody is homeomorphic to B^{2} × S^{1} (where S^{1} is the circle) and is called a solid torus. All other handlebodies may be obtained by taking the boundary-connected sum of a collection of solid tori.

== See also ==
- Handle decomposition
