= Virtually Haken conjecture =

Every compact, irreducible 3-manifold with infinite fundamental group is virtually Haken

In topology, an area of mathematics, the virtually Haken conjecture states that every compact, orientable, irreducible three-dimensional manifold with infinite fundamental group is virtually Haken. That is, it has a finite cover (a covering space with a finite-to-one covering map) that is a Haken manifold.

After the proof of the geometrization conjecture by Perelman, the conjecture was only open for hyperbolic 3-manifolds.

The conjecture is usually attributed to Friedhelm Waldhausen in a paper from 1968, although he did not formally state it. This problem is formally stated as Problem 3.2 in Kirby's problem list.

A proof of the conjecture was announced on March 12, 2012 by Ian Agol in a seminar lecture he gave at the Institut Henri Poincaré. The proof appeared shortly thereafter in a preprint which was eventually published in Documenta Mathematica. The proof was obtained via a strategy by previous work of Daniel Wise and collaborators, relying on actions of the fundamental group on certain auxiliary spaces (CAT(0) cube complexes, also known as median graphs) It used as an essential ingredient the freshly-obtained solution to the surface subgroup conjecture by Jeremy Kahn and Vladimir Markovic. Other results which are directly used in Agol's proof include the Malnormal Special Quotient Theorem of Wise and a criterion of Nicolas Bergeron and Wise for the cubulation of groups.

In 2018 related results were obtained by Piotr Przytycki and Daniel Wise proving that mixed 3-manifolds are also virtually special, that is they can be cubulated into a cube complex with a finite cover where all the hyperplanes are embedded which by the previous mentioned work can be made virtually Haken.

== See also ==
- Virtually fibered conjecture
- Surface subgroup conjecture
- Ehrenpreis conjecture
