= Haken manifold =

Mathematics concept

In mathematics, a Haken manifold is a compact, P²-irreducible 3-manifold that is sufficiently large, meaning that it contains a properly embedded two-sided incompressible surface. Sometimes one considers only orientable Haken manifolds, in which case a Haken manifold is a compact, orientable, irreducible 3-manifold that contains an orientable, incompressible surface.

A 3-manifold finitely covered by a Haken manifold is said to be virtually Haken. The Virtually Haken conjecture asserts that every compact, irreducible 3-manifold with infinite fundamental group is virtually Haken. This conjecture was proven by Ian Agol.

Haken manifolds were introduced by Wolfgang Haken (1961). Haken (1962) proved that Haken manifolds have a hierarchy, where they can be split up into 3-balls along incompressible surfaces. Haken also showed that there was a finite procedure to find an incompressible surface if the 3-manifold had one. William Jaco and Ulrich Oertel (1984) gave an algorithm to determine if a 3-manifold was Haken.

Normal surfaces are ubiquitous in the theory of Haken manifolds and their simple and rigid structure leads quite naturally to algorithms.

== Haken hierarchy ==
We will consider only the case of orientable Haken manifolds, as this simplifies the discussion; a regular neighborhood of an orientable surface in an orientable 3-manifold is just a "thickened up" version of the surface, i.e., a trivial I-bundle. So the regular neighborhood is a 3-dimensional submanifold with boundary containing two copies of the surface.

Given an orientable Haken manifold M, by definition it contains an orientable, incompressible surface S. Take the regular neighborhood of S and delete its interior from M, resulting in M' . In effect, we've cut M along the surface S. (This is analogous, in one less dimension, to cutting a surface along a circle or arc.) It is a theorem that any orientable compact manifold with a boundary component that is not a sphere has an infinite first homology group, which implies that it has a properly embedded 2-sided non-separating incompressible surface, and so is again a Haken manifold. Thus, we can pick another incompressible surface in M' , and cut along that. If eventually this sequence of cutting results in a manifold whose pieces (or components) are just 3-balls, we call this sequence a hierarchy.

== Applications ==
The hierarchy makes proving certain kinds of theorems about Haken manifolds a matter of induction. One proves the theorem for 3-balls. Then one proves that if the theorem is true for pieces resulting from a cutting of a Haken manifold, then it is true for that Haken manifold. The key here is that the cutting takes place along a surface that was very "nice", i.e., incompressible. This makes proving the induction step feasible in many cases.

Haken sketched out a proof of an algorithm to check if two Haken manifolds were homeomorphic or not. His outline was filled in by substantive efforts by Friedhelm Waldhausen, Klaus Johannson, Geoffrey Hemion, Sergeĭ Matveev, et al. Since there is an algorithm to check if a 3-manifold is Haken (cf. Jaco–Oertel), the basic problem of recognition of 3-manifolds can be considered to be solved for Haken manifolds.

Friedhelm Waldhausen (1968) proved that closed Haken manifolds are topologically rigid: roughly, any homotopy equivalence of Haken manifolds is homotopic to a homeomorphism (for the case of boundary, a condition on peripheral structure is needed). So these three-manifolds are completely determined by their fundamental group. In addition, Waldhausen proved that the fundamental groups of Haken manifolds have solvable word problem; this is also true for virtually Haken manifolds.

The hierarchy played a crucial role in William Thurston's hyperbolization theorem for Haken manifolds, part of his revolutionary geometrization program for 3-manifolds.

Johannson (1979) proved that atoroidal, anannular, boundary-irreducible, Haken three-manifolds have finite mapping class groups. This result can be recovered from the combination of Mostow rigidity with Thurston's geometrization theorem.

== Examples of Haken manifolds ==
Note that some families of examples are contained in others.

- Compact, irreducible 3-manifolds with positive first Betti number
- Surface bundles over the circle, this is a special case of the example above.
- Link complements, cf. also knot complements.
- Most Seifert fiber spaces have many incompressible tori

== See also ==
- Manifold decomposition
- P^{2}-irreducible manifold
