= Virtually fibered conjecture =

Conjecture pertaining to finite covers of 3-manifold subfields

In the mathematical subfield of 3-manifolds, the virtually fibered conjecture, formulated by American mathematician William Thurston, states that every closed, irreducible, atoroidal 3-manifold with infinite fundamental group has a finite cover which is a surface bundle over the circle.

A 3-manifold which has such a finite cover is said to virtually fiber. If M is a Seifert fiber space, then M virtually fibers if and only if the rational Euler number of the Seifert fibration or the (orbifold) Euler characteristic of the base space is zero.

The hypotheses of the conjecture are satisfied by hyperbolic 3-manifolds. In fact, given that the geometrization conjecture is now settled, the only case needed to be proven for the virtually fibered conjecture is that of hyperbolic 3-manifolds.

The original interest in the virtually fibered conjecture (as well as its weaker cousins, such as the virtually Haken conjecture) stemmed from the fact that any of these conjectures, combined with Thurston's hyperbolization theorem, would imply the geometrization conjecture. However, in practice all known attacks on the "virtual" conjecture take geometrization as a hypothesis, and rely on the geometric and group-theoretic properties of hyperbolic 3-manifolds.

The virtually fibered conjecture was not actually conjectured by Thurston. Rather, he posed it as a question, writing only that "[t]his dubious-sounding question seems to have a definite chance for a positive answer".

The conjecture was finally settled in the affirmative in a series of papers from 2009 to 2012. In a posting on the ArXiv on 25 Aug 2009, Daniel Wise implicitly implied (by referring to a then-unpublished longer manuscript) that he had proven the conjecture for the case where the 3-manifold is closed, hyperbolic, and Haken. This was followed by a survey article in Electronic Research Announcements in Mathematical Sciences. Several other articles have followed, including the aforementioned longer manuscript by Wise. In March 2012, during a conference at Institut Henri Poincaré in Paris, Ian Agol announced he could prove the virtually Haken conjecture for closed hyperbolic 3-manifolds. Taken together with Daniel Wise's results, this implies the virtually fibered conjecture for all closed hyperbolic 3-manifolds.

== See also ==
- Virtually Haken conjecture
- Surface subgroup conjecture
- Ehrenpreis conjecture
