= Seifert–Weber space =

In mathematics, Seifert–Weber space (introduced by Herbert Seifert and Constantin Weber) is a closed hyperbolic 3-manifold. It is also known as Seifert–Weber dodecahedral space and hyperbolic dodecahedral space. It is one of the first discovered examples of closed hyperbolic 3-manifolds.

It is constructed by gluing each face of a dodecahedron to its opposite in a way that produces a closed 3-manifold. There are three ways to do this gluing consistently. Opposite faces are misaligned by 1/10 of a turn, so to match them they must be rotated by 1/10, 3/10 or 5/10 turn; a rotation of 3/10 gives the Seifert–Weber space. Rotation of 1/10 gives the Poincaré homology sphere, and rotation by 5/10 gives 3-dimensional real projective space.

With the 3/10-turn gluing pattern, the edges of the original dodecahedron are glued to each other in groups of five. Thus, in the Seifert–Weber space, each edge is surrounded by five pentagonal faces, and the dihedral angle between these pentagons is 72°. This does not match the 117° dihedral angle of a regular dodecahedron in Euclidean space, but in hyperbolic space there exist regular dodecahedra with any dihedral angle between 60° and 117°, and the hyperbolic dodecahedron with dihedral angle 72° may be used to give the Seifert–Weber space a geometric structure as a hyperbolic manifold. It is a (finite volume) quotient space of the (non-finite volume) order-5 dodecahedral honeycomb, a regular tessellation of hyperbolic 3-space by dodecahedra with this dihedral angle.

The Seifert–Weber space is a rational homology sphere, and its first homology group is isomorphic to $\mathbb Z_5^3$. William Thurston conjectured that the Seifert–Weber space is not a Haken manifold, that is, it does not contain any incompressible surfaces; Burton, Rubinstein & Tillmann (2012) proved the conjecture with the aid of their computer software Regina.
