= Irreducibility (mathematics) =

In mathematics, the concept of irreducibility is used in several ways.

- A polynomial over a field may be an irreducible polynomial if it cannot be factored over that field.
- In abstract algebra, irreducible can be an abbreviation for irreducible element of an integral domain; for example an irreducible polynomial.
- In representation theory, an irreducible representation is a nontrivial representation with no nontrivial proper subrepresentations. Similarly, an irreducible module is another name for a simple module.
- Absolutely irreducible is a term applied to mean irreducible, even after any finite extension of the field of coefficients. It applies in various situations, for example to irreducibility of a linear representation, or of an algebraic variety; where it means just the same as irreducible over an algebraic closure.
- In commutative algebra, a commutative ring R is irreducible if its prime spectrum, that is, the topological space Spec R, is an irreducible topological space.
- A matrix is irreducible if it is not similar via a permutation to a block upper triangular matrix (that has more than one block of positive size). (Replacing non-zero entries in the matrix by one, and viewing the matrix as the adjacency matrix of a directed graph, the matrix is irreducible if and only if such directed graph is strongly connected.) A detailed definition is given here.
- Also, a Markov chain is irreducible if there is a non-zero probability of transitioning (even if in more than one step) from any state to any other state.
- In the theory of manifolds, an n-manifold is irreducible if any embedded (n − 1)-sphere bounds an embedded n-ball. Implicit in this definition is the use of a suitable category, such as the category of differentiable manifolds or the category of piecewise-linear manifolds. The notions of irreducibility in algebra and manifold theory are related. An n-manifold is called prime, if it cannot be written as a connected sum of two n-manifolds (neither of which is an n-sphere). An irreducible manifold is thus prime, although the converse does not hold. From an algebraist's perspective, prime manifolds should be called "irreducible"; however, the topologist (in particular the 3-manifold topologist) finds the definition above more useful. The only compact, connected 3-manifolds that are prime but not irreducible are the trivial 2-sphere bundle over S^{1} and the twisted 2-sphere bundle over S^{1}. See, for example, Prime decomposition (3-manifold).
- A topological space is irreducible if it is not the union of two proper closed subsets. This notion is used in algebraic geometry, where spaces are equipped with the Zariski topology; it is not of much significance for Hausdorff spaces. See also irreducible component, algebraic variety.
- In universal algebra, irreducible can refer to the inability to represent an algebraic structure as a composition of simpler structures using a product construction; for example subdirectly irreducible.
- A 3-manifold is P²-irreducible if it is irreducible and contains no 2-sided $\mathbb RP^2$ (real projective plane).
- An irreducible fraction (or fraction in lowest terms) is a vulgar fraction in which the numerator and denominator are smaller than those in any other equivalent fraction.
