= Geometrization theorem =

In geometry, geometrization theorem may refer to

- Thurston's hyperbolization theorem for Haken 3-manifolds
- Thurston's geometrization conjecture proved by Perelman, a generalization of the hyperbolization theorem to all compact 3-manifolds.
