= Abigail Thompson =

American mathematician

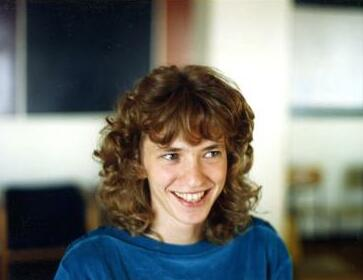
Thompson in 1987

Abigail A. Thompson (born 1958 in Norwalk, Connecticut) is an American mathematician. She works as a professor of mathematics at the University of California, Davis, where she specializes in knot theory and low-dimensional topology.

== Education and career ==
Thompson graduated from Wellesley College in 1979, and earned her Ph.D. in 1986 from Rutgers University under the joint supervision of Martin Scharlemann and Julius L. Shaneson. After visiting positions at the Hebrew University of Jerusalem and the University of California, Berkeley, she joined the University of California Davis faculty in 1988. Thompson had a postdoctoral fellowship with the National Science Foundation from 1988 to 1991 and a Sloan Foundation Fellowship from 1991 to 1993. She was a member of the Institute for Advanced Study in 1990–1991, 2000–2001, and 2015–2016. She became the Chair of the Department of Mathematics at UC Davis in 2017. She was one of the vice presidents of the American Mathematical Society; her term ran from February 1, 2019 to January 31, 2022.

== Research ==
Thompson extended David Gabai's concept of thin position from knots to 3-manifolds and Heegaard splittings.

== Education reform ==
Thompson has also been an activist for reform of primary and secondary school mathematics education. She has publicly attacked the Mathland-based curriculum in use in the mid-1990s when the oldest of her three children began studying mathematics in school, claiming that it provided an inadequate foundation in basic mathematical skills, left no opportunity for independent work, and was based on poorly written materials. As an alternative, she founded a program at UC Davis to improve teacher knowledge of mathematics, and became the director of the California State Summer School for Mathematics and Science, a month-long summer mathematics camp for high school students.

== Recognition ==
Thompson won the 2003 Ruth Lyttle Satter Prize in Mathematics for her research on thin position and Heegard splittings. In 2013, she became one of the inaugural fellows of the American Mathematical Society.

In February 2020, Thompson was recognized by the American Council of Trustees and Alumni (ACTA) as a "Hero of Intellectual Freedom". The award is due to an op-ed Thompson published in The Wall Street Journal on December 19, 2019, denouncing the use of mandatory diversity statements in faculty hiring practices in the University of California system. Thompson delivered the keynote address at ACTA's ATHENA Roundtable Conference on November 13, 2020. In December 2019, she published a similar opinion piece under the heading "A word from... Abigail Thompson" in the Notices of the American Mathematical Society, of which she was one of the Vice Presidents at the time. Both opinion pieces generated a lot of discussion within the mathematics community and the academy in general, with official responses from the Association for Women in Mathematics, and the UC Davis Chancellor and Vice Chancellor among others.

== Selected publications ==
Research papers

- Scharlemann, Martin; Thompson, Abigail (1994), "Thin position for 3-manifolds", Geometric topology (Haifa, 1992), Contemp. Math., vol. 164, Amer. Math. Soc., Providence, RI, pp. 231–238, doi:10.1090/conm/164/01596, ISBN 978-0-8218-5182-1, MR 1282766.
- Scharlemann, Martin; Thompson, Abigail (1994), "Thin position and Heegaard splittings of the 3-sphere", Journal of Differential Geometry, 39 (2): 343–357, doi:10.4310/jdg/1214454875, MR 1267894.
- Thompson, Abigail (1994), "Thin position and the recognition problem for S^{3}", Mathematical Research Letters, 1 (5): 613–630, doi:10.4310/MRL.1994.v1.n5.a9, MR 1295555.
- Thompson, Abigail (1997), "Thin position and bridge number for knots in the 3-sphere", Topology, 36 (2): 505–507, doi:10.1016/0040-9383(96)00010-9, MR 1415602.

Books

- Adams, Colin; Hass, Joel; Thompson, Abigail (1998), How to Ace Calculus: The Streetwise Guide, New York: W.H. Freeman and Company, ISBN 0-7167-3160-6.
- Adams, Colin; Hass, Joel; Thompson, Abigail (2001), How to Ace the Rest of Calculus: The Streetwise Guide, New York: W.H. Freeman and Company, ISBN 0-7167-4174-1.
