= Rational homotopy sphere =

Manifold with the same rational homotopy groups as a sphere

In algebraic topology, a rational homotopy $n$-sphere is an $n$-dimensional manifold with the same rational homotopy groups as the $n$-sphere. These serve, among other things, to understand which information the rational homotopy groups of a space can or cannot measure and which attenuations result from neglecting torsion in comparison to the (integral) homotopy groups of the space.

== Definition ==
A rational homotopy $n$-sphere is an $n$-dimensional manifold $\Sigma$ with the same rational homotopy groups as the $n$-sphere $S^n$:

$$\pi_k(\Sigma)\otimes\mathbb{Q}
=\pi_k(S^n)\otimes\mathbb{Q}
\cong\begin{cases}
\mathbb{Z} & ;k=n\text{ if }n\text{ even} \\
\mathbb{Z} & ;k=n,2n-1\text{ if }n\text{ odd} \\
1 & ;\text{otherwise}
\end{cases}.$$

== Properties ==
- Every (integral) homotopy sphere is a rational homotopy sphere.

== Examples ==
- The $n$-sphere $S^n$ itself is obviously a rational homotopy $n$-sphere.
- The Poincaré homology sphere is a rational homology $3$-sphere in particular.
- The real projective space $\R P^n$ is a rational homotopy sphere for all $n>0$. The fiber bundle $S^0\rightarrow S^n\rightarrow\mathbb{R}P^n$ yields with the long exact sequence of homotopy groups that $\pi_k(\mathbb{R}P^n)\cong\pi_k(S^n)$ for $k>1$ and $n>0$ as well as $\pi_1(\R P^1) =\mathbb{Z}$ and $\pi_1(\R P^n) =\mathbb{Z}_2$ for $n>1$, which vanishes after rationalization. $\R P^1\cong S^1$ is the sphere in particular.

== See also ==
- Rational homology sphere

== Literature ==
- Hatcher, Allen (2002), Algebraic Topology, Cambridge University Press, ISBN 0-521-79540-0, archived from the original on June 16, 2006
