= Colin Adams (mathematician) =

American mathematician (born 1956)

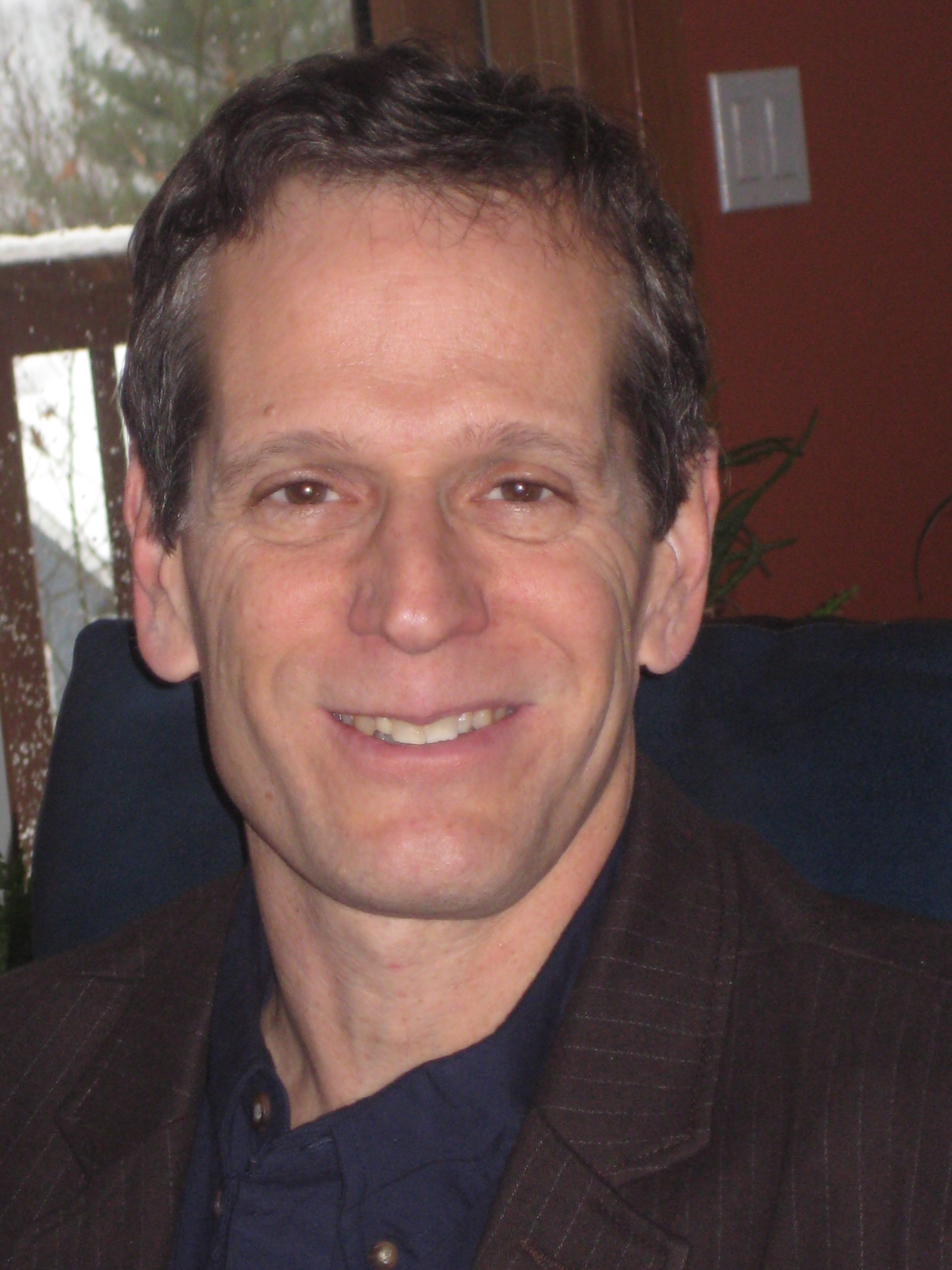
- Born: October 13, 1956 (age 70)
- Education: Massachusetts Institute of Technology (BS); University of Wisconsin (PhD)
- Scientific career
- Fields: Mathematics
- Workplaces: Williams College
- Doctoral advisor: James W. Cannon

Colin Conrad Adams (born October 13, 1956) is an American mathematician primarily working in the areas of hyperbolic 3-manifolds and knot theory. His book, The Knot Book, has been praised for its accessible approach to advanced topics in knot theory. He is currently Francis Christopher Oakley Third Century Professor of Mathematics at Williams College, where he has been since 1985. He writes "Mathematically Bent", a column of math for the Mathematical Intelligencer. His nephew is popular American singer Still Woozy.

== Academic career ==
Adams received a B.S. from the Massachusetts Institute of Technology in 1978 and a Ph.D. in mathematics from the University of Wisconsin–Madison in 1983. His dissertation was titled "Hyperbolic Structures on Link Complements" and was supervised by James Cannon.

== Work ==
Among his earliest contributions is his theorem that the Gieseking manifold is the unique cusped hyperbolic 3-manifold of smallest volume. The proof utilizes horoball-packing arguments. Adams is known for his clever use of such arguments utilizing horoball patterns and his work would be used in the later proof by Chun Cao and G. Robert Meyerhoff that the smallest cusped orientable hyperbolic 3-manifolds are precisely the figure-eight knot complement and its sibling manifold.

Adams has investigated and defined a variety of geometric invariants of hyperbolic links and hyperbolic 3-manifolds in general. He developed techniques for working with volumes of special classes of hyperbolic links. He proved augmented alternating links, which he defined, were hyperbolic. In addition, he has defined almost alternating and toroidally alternating links. He has often collaborated and published this research with students from SMALL, an undergraduate summer research program at Williams.

In 1998, Adams received the Deborah and Franklin Haimo Award for Distinguished College or University Teaching of Mathematics.

In 2012 he became a fellow of the American Mathematical Society.

== Books ==
- Adams, Colin (2022). The Tiling Book: An Introduction to the Mathematical Theory of Tilings. Providence, RI: American Mathematical Society. ISBN 978-1470468972.
- Adams, Colin (2022). The Math Museum: A Survival Story. MAA Press. ISBN 978-1470468583.
- Adams, Colin (2004). The Knot Book: An elementary introduction to the mathematical theory of knots. Providence, RI: American Mathematical Society. ISBN 0-8218-3678-1. (Revised reprint of the 1994 original.)
- Adams, Colin; Hass, Joel; Thompson, Abigail (1998). How to Ace Calculus: The Streetwise Guide. W. H. Freeman and Company. ISBN 0-7167-3160-6.
- Adams, Colin (2004). Why Knot?: An Introduction to the Mathematical Theory of Knots. Key College. ISBN 1-931914-22-2.
- Adams, Colin; Franzosa, Robert (2007). Introduction to Topology: Pure and Applied. Prentice Hall. ISBN 978-0-13-184869-6.
- Adams, Colin (2009). Riot at the Calc Exam and Other Mathematically Bent Stories. American Mathematical Society. ISBN 978-0-8218-4817-3.
- Adams, Colin (2014). Zombies & Calculus. Princeton University Press. ISBN 978-0691161907.
- Rogawski, Jon; Adams, Colin (2015). Calculus. W. H. Freeman. ISBN 978-1464125263.

== Selected publications ==
- Adams, Colin C. (1985). "Thrice-punctured spheres in hyperbolic $3$-manifolds". Transactions of the American Mathematical Society. 287 (2): 645–656. doi:10.1090/S0002-9947-1985-0768730-6.
- Adams, Colin C. (1986). "Augmented alternating link complements are hyperbolic". Low-dimensional topology and Kleinian groups (Coventry/Durham, 1984). London Mathematical Society Lecture Note Series. Vol. 112. Cambridge: Cambridge University Press. pp. 115–130.
- Adams, Colin C. (1987). "The noncompact hyperbolic $3$-manifold of minimal volume". Proceedings of the American Mathematical Society. 100 (4): 601–606. doi:10.1090/S0002-9939-1987-0894423-8.
- Adams, Colin C.; Reid, Alan W. (2000). "Systoles of hyperbolic $3$-manifolds". Mathematical Proceedings of the Cambridge Philosophical Society. 128 (1): 103–110. Bibcode:2000MPCPS.128..103A. doi:10.1017/S0305004199003990.
- Adams, C.; Colestock, A.; Fowler, J.; Gillam, W.; Katerman, E. (2006). "Cusp size bounds from singular surfaces in hyperbolic $3$-manifolds". Transactions of the American Mathematical Society. 358 (2): 727–741. doi:10.1090/S0002-9947-05-03662-7.
- Adams, C.; Capovilla-Searle, Orsola; Freeman, Jesse; Irvine, Daniel; Petti, Samantha; Vitek, Daniel; Weber, Ashley; Zhang, Sicong (2015). "Bounds on Ubercrossing and Petal Number for Knots". Journal of Knot Theory and Its Ramifications. 24 (2) 1550012. arXiv:1311.0526. doi:10.1142/S0218216515500121.
