= J. Hyam Rubinstein =

Australian mathematician

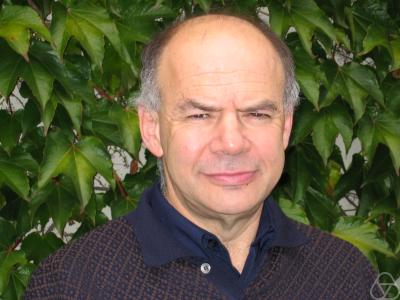
- J. Hyam Rubinstein in 2005 (photo from MFO)
- Born: March 7, 1948 (age 78); Melbourne
- Education: University of California, Berkeley
- Known for: 3-sphere recognition
- Awards: Australian Mathematical Society Medal; George Szekeres Medal (2008); Hannan Medal (2003)
- Scientific career
- Fields: low-dimensional topology
- Doctoral advisor: John Robert Stallings

Joachim Hyam Rubinstein FAA (born 7 March 1948, in Melbourne) is an Australian top mathematician specialising in low-dimensional topology; he is currently serving as an honorary professor in the Department of Mathematics and Statistics at the University of Melbourne, having retired in 2019.

He has spoken and written widely on the state of the mathematical sciences in Australia, with particular focus on the impacts of reduced Government spending for university mathematics departments.

== Education ==
In 1965, Rubinstein matriculated (i.e. graduated) from Melbourne High School in Melbourne, Australia winning the maximum of four exhibitions. In 1969, he graduated from Monash University in Melbourne, with a B.Sc.(Honours) degree in mathematics.

In 1974, Rubinstein received his Ph.D. from the University of California, Berkeley under the advisership of John Stallings. His dissertation was on the topic of Isotopies of Incompressible Surfaces in Three Dimensional Manifolds.

== Research interests ==
His major contributions include results involving almost normal Heegaard splittings and the closely related joint work with Jon T. Pitts relating strongly irreducible Heegaard splittings to minimal surfaces, joint work with William Jaco on special triangulations of 3-manifolds (namely 0-efficient and 1-efficient triangulations), and joint work with Martin Scharlemann on the Rubinstein–Scharlemann graphic. He is a key figure in the algorithmic theory of 3-manifolds, and one of the initial developers of the Regina program, which implements his 3-sphere recognition algorithm.

His research interests also include: shortest networks applied to underground mine design, machine learning, learning theory, financial mathematics, and stock market trading systems.

== Honours ==
- Past President of the Australian Mathematical Society.
- Chair of the Australian Committee for the Mathematical Sciences.
- Elected Fellow of the Australian Academy of Science in 2003.
- Recipient of the Hannan Medal in 2004.
- Recipient of the George Szekeres Medal in 2008.
- Fellow of the American Mathematical Society, 2012.
- From July 11 to 22, 2011, a workshop and conference in his honour, jointly titled “Hyamfest: Geometry & Topology Down Under”, were held at the University of Melbourne.
