= P2-irreducible manifold =

In mathematics, a P^{2}-irreducible manifold is a 3-manifold that is irreducible and contains no 2-sided $\mathbb RP^2$ (real projective plane). An orientable manifold is P^{2}-irreducible if and only if it is irreducible. Every non-orientable P^{2}-irreducible manifold is a Haken manifold.
