= Surface subgroup conjecture =

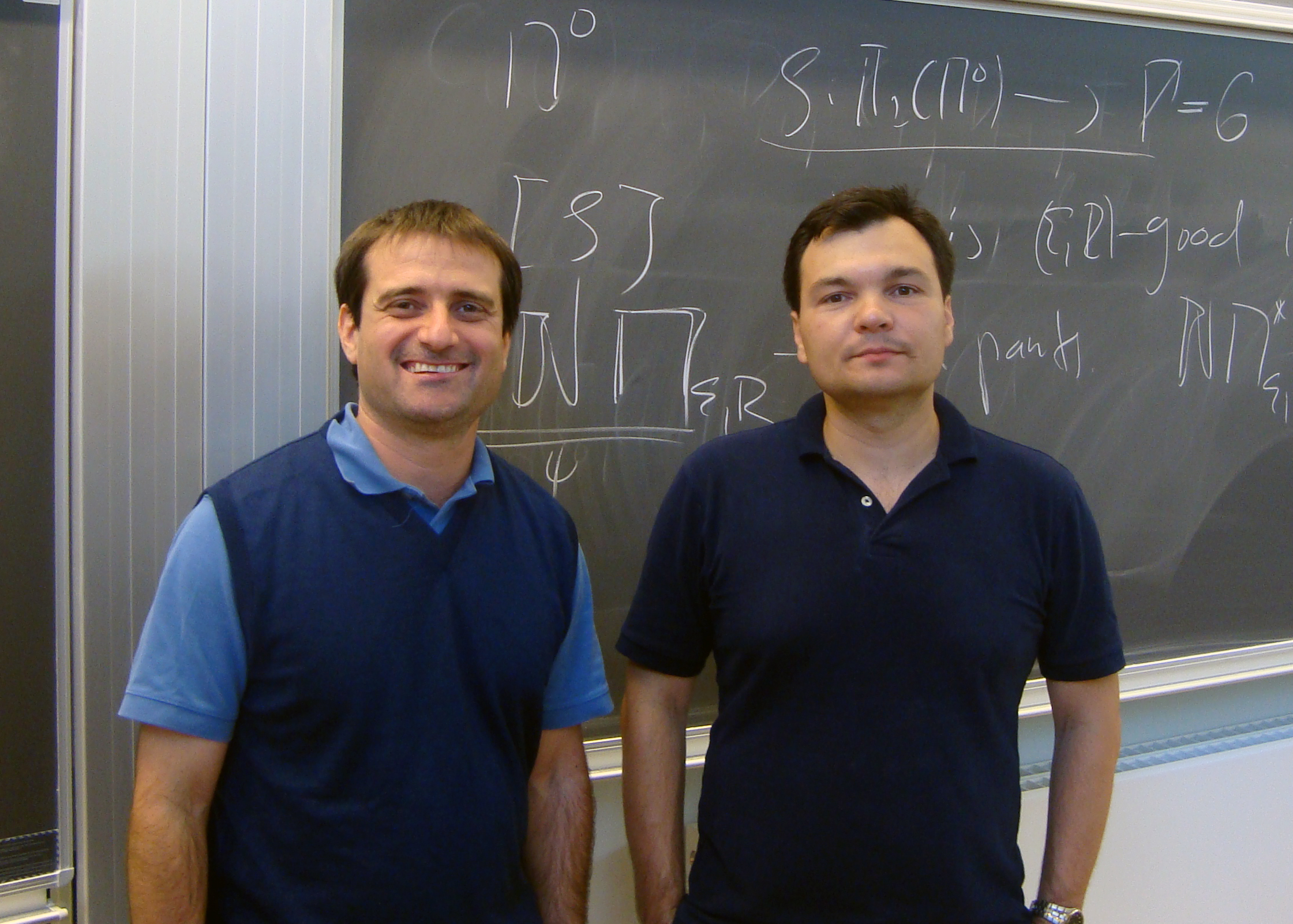
Jeremy Kahn and Vladimir Markovic who first proved the conjecture, Aarhus, 2012.

In mathematics, the surface subgroup conjecture of Friedhelm Waldhausen states that the fundamental group of every closed, irreducible 3-manifold with infinite fundamental group has a surface subgroup. By "surface subgroup" we mean the fundamental group of a closed surface not the 2-sphere. This problem is listed as Problem 3.75 in Robion Kirby's problem list.

Assuming the geometrization conjecture, the only open case was that of closed hyperbolic 3-manifolds. A proof of this case was announced in the summer of 2009 by Jeremy Kahn and Vladimir Markovic and outlined in a talk August 4, 2009 at the FRG (Focused Research Group) Conference hosted by the University of Utah. A preprint appeared in the arxiv.org server in October 2009. Their paper was published in the Annals of Mathematics in 2012. In June 2012, Kahn and Markovic were given the Clay Research Awards by the Clay Mathematics Institute at a ceremony in Oxford.

== See also ==
- Virtually Haken conjecture
- Ehrenpreis conjecture
