= Ehrenpreis conjecture =

Any 2 closed Riemann surfaces of genus > 1 have quasiconformal finite-degree covers

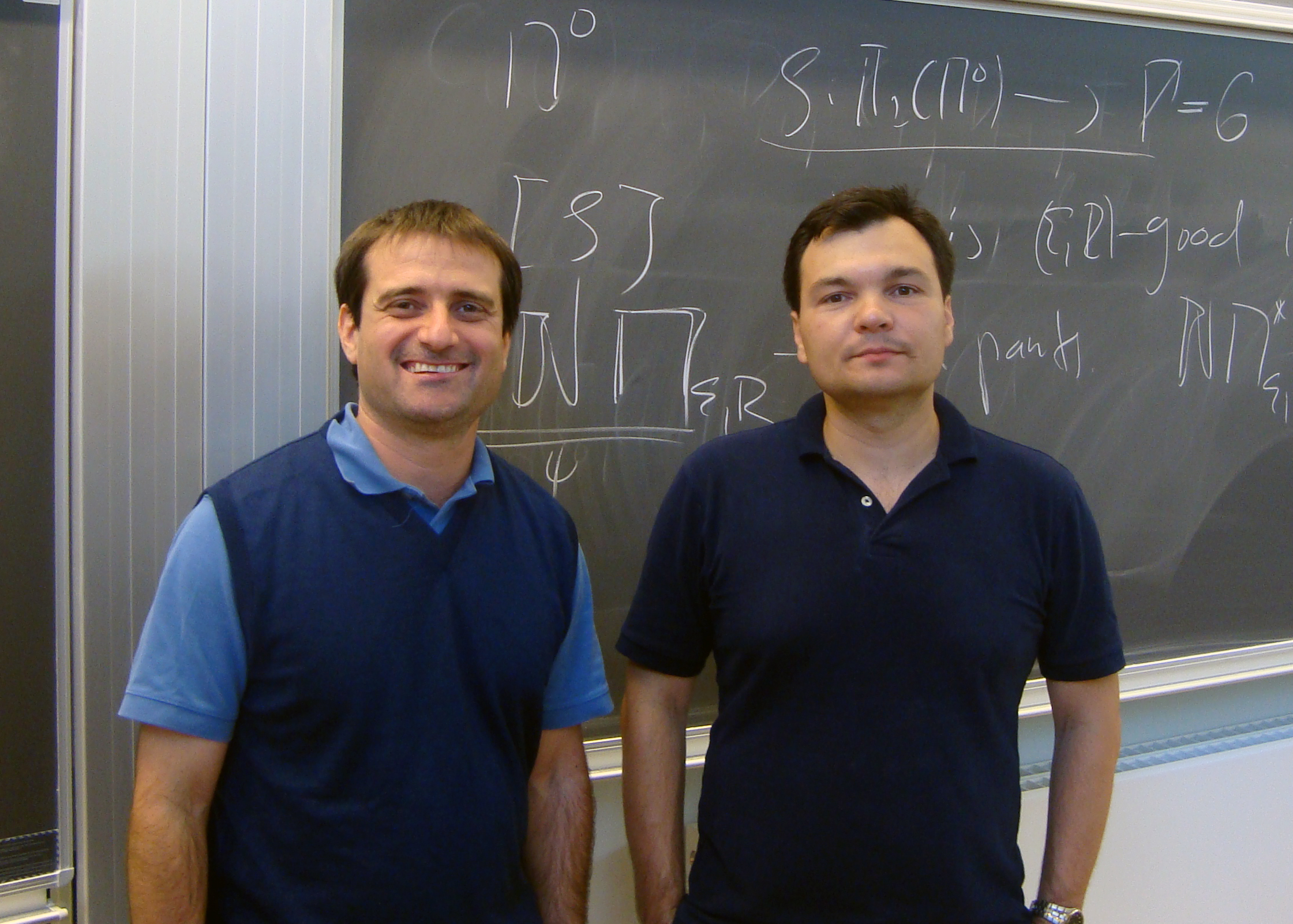
Jeremy Kahn and Vladimir Markovic, who first proved the conjecture, at Aarhus University in 2012.

In mathematics, the Ehrenpreis conjecture of Leon Ehrenpreis states that for any K greater than 1, any two closed Riemann surfaces of genus at least 2 have finite-degree covers which are K-quasiconformal: that is, the covers are arbitrarily close in the Teichmüller metric.

A proof was announced by Jeremy Kahn and Vladimir Markovic in January 2011, using their proof of the Surface subgroup conjecture and a newly developed "good pants homology" theory. In June 2012, Kahn and Markovic were given the Clay Research Awards for their work on these two problems by the Clay Mathematics Institute at a ceremony at Oxford University.

== See also ==
- Surface subgroup conjecture
- Virtually Haken conjecture
- Virtually fibered conjecture
