= Torus bundle =

A torus bundle, in the sub-field of geometric topology in mathematics, is a kind of surface bundle over the circle, which in turn is a class of three-manifolds.

== Construction ==
To obtain a torus bundle: let $f$ be an orientation-preserving homeomorphism of the two-dimensional torus $T$ to itself. Then the three-manifold $M(f)$ is obtained by

- taking the Cartesian product of $T$ and the unit interval and
- gluing one component of the boundary of the resulting manifold to the other boundary component via the map $f$.

Then $M(f)$ is the torus bundle with monodromy $f$.

== Examples ==
For example, if $f$ is the identity map (i.e., the map which fixes every point of the torus) then the resulting torus bundle $M(f)$ is the three-torus: the Cartesian product of three circles.

Seeing the possible kinds of torus bundles in more detail requires an understanding of William Thurston's geometrization program. Briefly, if $f$ is finite order, then the manifold $M(f)$ has Euclidean geometry. If $f$ is a power of a Dehn twist then $M(f)$ has Nil geometry. Finally, if $f$ is an Anosov map then the resulting three-manifold has Sol geometry.

These three cases exactly correspond to the three possibilities for the absolute value of the trace of the action of $f$ on the homology of the torus: either less than two, equal to two, or greater than two.
