= Homology manifold =

In mathematics, a homology manifold (or generalized manifold) is a locally compact topological space X that looks locally like a topological manifold from the point of view of homology theory.

== Definition ==
A homology G-manifold (without boundary) of dimension n over an abelian group G of coefficients is a locally compact topological space X with finite G-cohomological dimension such that for any x∈X, the homology groups

$$H_p(X,X-x, G)$$

are trivial unless p=n, in which case they are isomorphic to G. Here H is some homology theory, usually singular homology. Homology manifolds are the same as homology Z-manifolds.

More generally, one can define homology manifolds with boundary, by allowing the local homology groups to vanish at some points, which are of course called the boundary of the homology manifold. The boundary of an n-dimensional first-countable homology manifold is an n−1 dimensional homology manifold (without boundary).

== Examples ==
- Any topological manifold is a homology manifold.
- An example of a homology manifold that is not a manifold is the suspension of a homology sphere that is not a sphere.

== Properties ==
- If X×Y is a topological manifold, then X and Y are homology manifolds.
