= Nicolas Bergeron =

French mathematician (1975–2024)

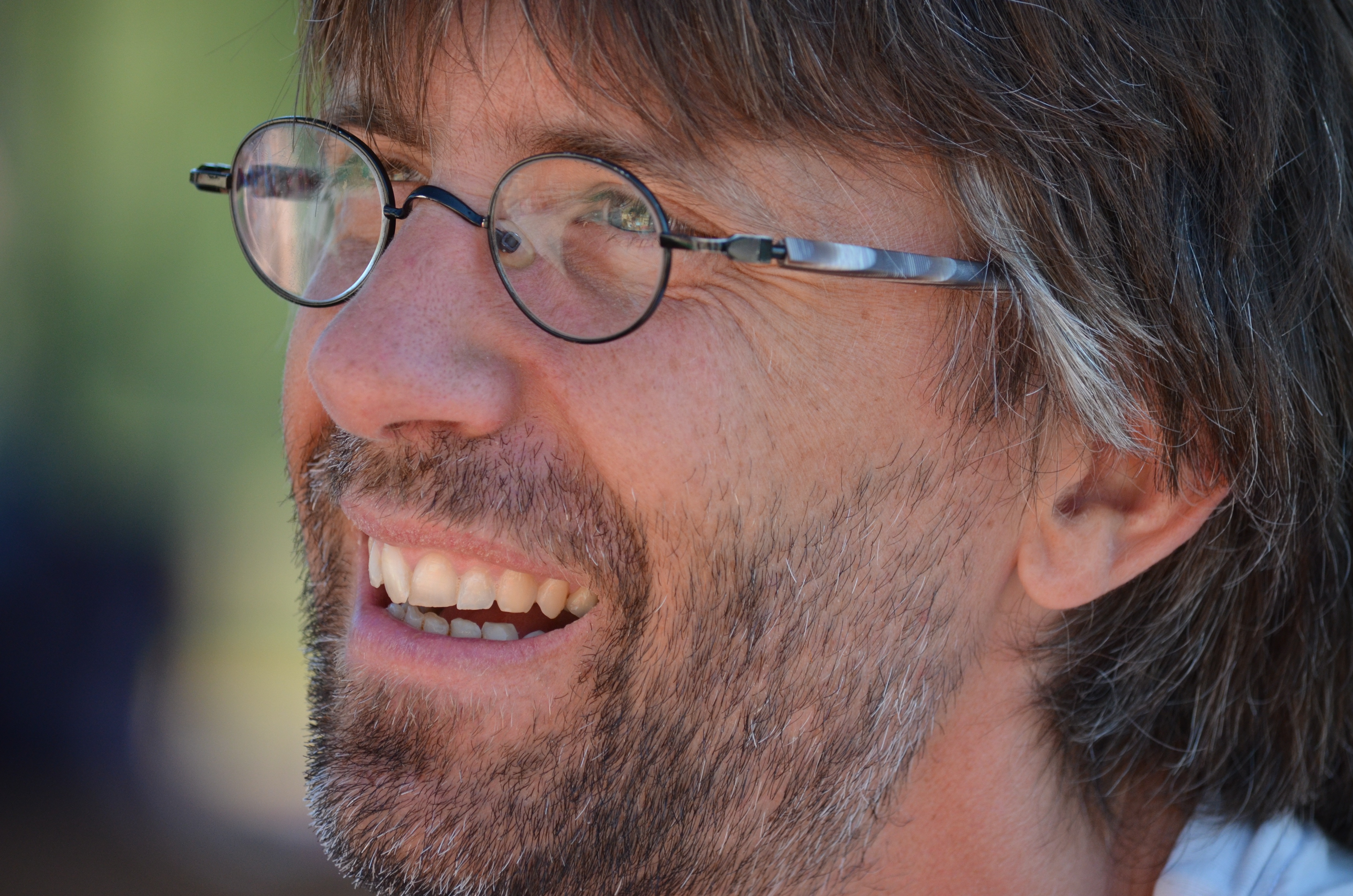
- Bergeron in 2004
- Born: 19 December 1975
- Died: 15 February 2024 (aged 48)
- Awards: Médaille de bronze du CNRS (2007), Prix fondé par l'Etat (2023)
- Scientific career
- Fields: Mathematics, Number Theory, Geometry, Topology
- Workplaces: Pierre and Marie Curie University
- Doctoral advisor: Jean-Pierre Otal

Nicolas Bergeron (19 December 1975 – 15 February 2024) was a French mathematician who worked in Pierre and Marie Curie University in Paris.

== Early career ==
Bergeron obtained his PhD at École normale supérieure de Lyon in the year 2000 under the supervision of Jean-Pierre Otal. His thesis was titled Cycles géodésiques dans les variétés hyperboliques ("geodesic cycles in hyperbolic varieties").

== Work ==
Bergeron's main interests concerned the geometry and topology of locally symmetric spaces and arithmetic groups, as well as their cohomology, and their connection to number theory, in particular to Hilbert's 12th problem.

Some of his publications showed an interest in Oulipo, referencing An Attempt at Exhausting a Place in Paris by Georges Perec. He also wrote a (non-mathematical) article about Jacques Roubaud.

Bergeron was latterly a member of the editorial board of the journal Publications Mathématiques de l'IHÉS.

== Death ==
Bergeron died on 15 February 2024, at the age of 48.

== Publications ==
- Bergeron, Nicolas; Clozel, Laurent (2005). Spectre automorphe des variétés hyperboliques et applications topologiques (in French). Paris: Société mathématique de France. ISBN 2-85629-186-4. OCLC 70784273.
- Bergeron, Nicolas; Wise, Daniel T. (2012). "A Boundary Criterion for Cubulation". American Journal of Mathematics. 134 (3). The Johns Hopkins University Press: 843–859. arXiv:0908.3609. doi:10.1353/ajm.2012.0020. ISSN 0002-9327. JSTOR 23240564.
- "Exposé Bourbaki 1055 : La conjecture des sous-groupes de surfaces d'après Jeremy Kahn et Vladimir Markovic". Société Mathématique de France (in French).
- Nicolas Bourbaki Seminar 2013–2014 no. 1078 Toute variété de dimension 3 compacte et asphérique est virtuellement de Haken ("Every 3-Dimensional Compact Ashperical Variety is Virtually Haken") (following Ian Agol, Daniel Wise)
- Bergeron edited a few articles for the site Images des mathématiques du CNRS.
- Le spectre des surfaces hyperboliques ("The Spectrum of Hyperbolic Surfaces") (EDP Sciences – Collection : Savoirs Actuels – September 2011)
- with Akshay Venkatesh: The asymptotic growth of torsion homology for arithmetic, groups, J. Inst. Math Jussieu 12 (2013), no.2, 391-447.
- with John Millson and Colette Moeglin: The Hodge conjecture and arithmetic quotients of complex balls, Acta Math. 216 (2016), no. 1, 1–125.
- With 14 co-authors, Uniformisation des surfaces de Riemann ("Uniformization of Riemann Surfaces").
- Nicolas Bergeron; Pierre Charollois; Luis García. Cocycles de groupes pour GLn et arrangements d'hyperplans. (AMS-CRM vol. 39 - 2023).

== Awards and prizes ==
- Bergeron won the Médaille de bronze du CNRS in 2007
- Bergeron was a junior member of Institut Universitaire de France from 2010 until 2015
- Bergeron was an invited speaker at the 2018 International congress of mathematicians in Rio with a talk on "Hodge theory and cycle theory of locally symmetric spaces"
- Bergeron was a Takagi lecturer in 2018.
- Bergeron was a Aisenstadt chair lecturer in Montréal in 2020.
- Bergeron received the Prix fondé par l'Etat from French Académie des Sciences in 2023.
