= Hyperbolic 3-manifold =

Manifold of dimension 3 equipped with a hyperbolic metric

In mathematics, more precisely in topology and differential geometry, a hyperbolic 3-manifold is a manifold of dimension 3 equipped with a hyperbolic metric, that is a Riemannian metric which has all its sectional curvatures equal to −1. It is generally required that this metric be also complete: in this case the manifold can be realised as a quotient of the 3-dimensional hyperbolic space by a discrete group of isometries (a Kleinian group).

Hyperbolic 3-manifolds of finite volume have a particular importance in 3-dimensional topology as follows from Thurston's geometrisation conjecture proved by Perelman. The study of Kleinian groups is also an important topic in geometric group theory.

== Importance in topology ==
Hyperbolic geometry is the most rich and least understood of the eight geometries in dimension 3 (for example, for all other geometries it is not hard to give an explicit enumeration of the finite-volume manifolds with this geometry, while this is far from being the case for hyperbolic manifolds). After the proof of the Geometrisation conjecture, understanding the topological properties of hyperbolic 3-manifolds is thus a major goal of 3-dimensional topology. Recent breakthroughs of Kahn–Markovic, Wise, Agol and others have answered most long-standing open questions on the topic but there are still many less prominent ones which have not been solved.

In dimension 2 almost all closed surfaces are hyperbolic (all but the sphere, projective plane, torus and Klein bottle). In dimension 3 this is far from true: there are many ways to construct infinitely many non-hyperbolic closed manifolds. On the other hand, the heuristic statement that "a generic 3-manifold tends to be hyperbolic" is verified in many contexts. For example, any knot which is not either a satellite knot or a torus knot is hyperbolic. Moreover, almost all Dehn surgeries on a hyperbolic knot yield a hyperbolic manifold. A similar result is true of links (Thurston's hyperbolic Dehn surgery theorem), and since all 3-manifolds are obtained as surgeries on a link in the 3-sphere this gives a more precise sense to the informal statement. Another sense in which "almost all" manifolds are hyperbolic in dimension 3 is that of random models. For example, random Heegaard splittings of genus at least 2 are almost surely hyperbolic (when the complexity of the gluing map goes to infinity).

The relevance of the hyperbolic geometry of a 3-manifold to its topology also comes from the Mostow rigidity theorem, which states that the hyperbolic structure of a hyperbolic 3-manifold of finite volume is uniquely determined by its homotopy type. In particular, geometric invariants such as the volume can be used to define new topological invariants.

== Structure ==
=== Manifolds of finite volume ===
In this case one important tool to understand the geometry of a manifold is the thick-thin decomposition. It states that a hyperbolic 3-manifold of finite volume has a decomposition into two parts:

- the thick part, where the injectivity radius is larger than an absolute constant;
- and its complement, the thin part, which is a disjoint union of solid tori and cusps.

=== Geometrically finite manifolds ===
The thick-thin decomposition is valid for all hyperbolic 3-manifolds, though in general the thin part is not as described above. A hyperbolic 3-manifold is said to be geometrically finite if it contains a convex submanifold (its convex core) onto which it retracts, and whose thick part is compact (note that all manifolds have a convex core, but in general it is not compact). The simplest case is when the manifold does not have "cusps" (i.e. the fundamental group does not contain parabolic elements), in which case the manifold is geometrically finite if and only if it is the quotient of a closed, convex subset of hyperbolic space by a group acting cocompactly on this subset.

=== Manifolds with finitely generated fundamental group ===
This is the larger class of hyperbolic 3-manifolds for which there is a satisfying structure theory. It rests on two theorems:

- The tameness theorem which states that such a manifold is homeomorphic to the interior of a compact manifold with boundary;
- The ending lamination theorem which provides a classification of hyperbolic structure on the interior of a compact manifold by its "end invariants".

== Construction of hyperbolic 3-manifolds of finite volume ==
=== Hyperbolic polyhedra, reflection groups ===
The oldest construction of hyperbolic manifolds, which dates back at least to Poincaré, goes as follows: start with a finite collection of 3-dimensional hyperbolic finite polytopes. Suppose that there is a side-pairing between the 2-dimensional faces of these polyhedra (i.e. each such face is paired with another, distinct, one so that they are isometric to each other as 2-dimensional hyperbolic polygons), and consider the space obtained by gluing the paired faces together (formally this is obtained as a quotient space). It carries a hyperbolic metric which is well-defined outside of the image of the 1-skeletons of the polyhedra. This metric extends to a hyperbolic metric on the whole space if the two following conditions are satisfied:

- for each (non-ideal) vertex in the gluing the sum of the solid angles of the polyhedra to which it belongs is equal to 4π ;
- for each edge in the gluing the sum of the dihedral angles of the polyhedra to which it belongs is equal to 2π .

A notable example of this construction is the Seifert–Weber space which is obtained by gluing opposite faces of a regular dodecahedron.

A variation on this construction is by using hyperbolic Coxeter polytopes (polytopes whose dihedral angles are of the form $\pi/m, m \in \mathbb N$). Such a polytope gives rise to a Kleinian reflection group, which is a discrete subgroup of isometries of hyperbolic space. Taking a torsion-free finite-index subgroup one obtains a hyperbolic manifold (which can be recovered by the previous construction, gluing copies of the original Coxeter polytope in a manner prescribed by an appropriate Schreier coset graph).

=== Gluing ideal tetrahedra and hyperbolic Dehn surgery ===
In the previous construction the manifolds obtained are always compact. To obtain manifolds with cusps one has to use polytopes which have ideal vertices (i.e. vertices which lie on the sphere at infinity). In this setting the gluing construction does not always yield a complete manifold. Completeness is detected by a system of equations involving the dihedral angles around the edges adjacent to an ideal vertex, which are commonly called Thurston's gluing equations. In case the gluing is complete the ideal vertices become cusps in the manifold. An example of a noncompact, finite volume hyperbolic manifold obtained in this way is the Gieseking manifold which is constructed by gluing faces of a regular ideal hyperbolic tetrahedron together.

It is also possible to construct a finite-volume, complete hyperbolic manifold when the gluing is not complete. In this case the completion of the metric space obtained is a manifold with a torus boundary and under some (not generic) conditions it is possible to glue a hyperbolic solid torus on each boundary component so that the resulting space has a complete hyperbolic metric. Topologically, the manifold is obtained by hyperbolic Dehn surgery on the complete hyperbolic manifold which would result from a complete gluing.

It is not known whether all hyperbolic 3-manifolds of finite volume can be constructed in this way. In practice however this is how computational software (such as SnapPea or Regina) stores hyperbolic manifolds.

=== Arithmetic constructions ===
The construction of arithmetic Kleinian groups from quaternion algebras gives rise to particularly interesting hyperbolic manifolds. On the other hand, they are in some sense "rare" among hyperbolic 3-manifolds (for example hyperbolic Dehn surgery on a fixed manifold results in a non-arithmetic manifold for almost all parameters).

=== The hyperbolisation theorem ===
In contrast to the explicit constructions above it is possible to deduce the existence of a complete hyperbolic structure on a 3-manifold purely from topological information. This is a consequence of the Geometrisation conjecture and can be stated as follows (a statement sometimes referred to as the "hyperbolisation theorem", which was proven by Thurston in the special case of Haken manifolds):

If a compact 3-manifold with toric boundary is irreducible and algebraically atoroidal (meaning that every π_{1}-injectively immersed torus is homotopic to a boundary component) then its interior carries a complete hyperbolic metric of finite volume.

A particular case is that of a surface bundle over the circle: such manifolds are always irreducible, and they carry a complete hyperbolic metric if and only if the monodromy is a pseudo-Anosov map.

Another consequence of the Geometrisation conjecture is that any closed 3-manifold which admits a Riemannian metric with negative sectional curvatures admits in fact a Riemannian metric with constant sectional curvature -1. This is not true in higher dimensions.

== Virtual properties ==
The topological properties of 3-manifolds are sufficiently intricate that in many cases it is interesting to know that a property holds virtually for a class of manifolds, that is for any manifold in the class there exists a finite covering space of the manifold with the property. The virtual properties of hyperbolic 3-manifolds are the objects of a series of conjectures by Waldhausen and Thurston, which were recently all proven by Ian Agol following work of Jeremy Kahn, Vlad Markovic, Frédéric Haglund, Dani Wise and others. The first part of the conjectures were logically related to the virtually Haken conjecture. In order of strength they are:

1. (the surface subgroup conjecture) The fundamental group of any hyperbolic manifold of finite volume contains a (non-free) surface group (the fundamental group of a closed surface).
2. (the Virtually Haken conjecture) Any hyperbolic 3-manifold of finite volume is virtually Haken; that is, it contains an embedded closed surface such that the embedding induces an injective map between fundamental groups.
3. Any hyperbolic 3-manifold of finite volume has a finite cover with a nonzero first Betti number.
4. Any hyperbolic 3-manifold of finite volume has a finite cover whose fundamental group surjects onto a non-abelian free group (such groups are usually called large).

Another conjecture (also proven by Agol) which implies 1-3 above but a priori has no relation to 4 is the following :

5. (the virtually fibered conjecture) Any hyperbolic 3-manifold of finite volume has a finite cover which is a surface bundle over the circle.

== The space of all hyperbolic 3-manifolds ==
=== Geometric convergence ===
A sequence of Kleinian groups is said to be geometrically convergent if it converges in the Chabauty topology. For the manifolds obtained as quotients this amounts to them being convergent in the pointed Gromov-Hausdorff metric.

=== Jørgensen–Thurston theory ===
The hyperbolic volume can be used to order the space of all hyperbolic manifolds. The set of manifolds corresponding to a given volume is at most finite, and the set of volumes is well-ordered and of order type ω^{ω} . More precisely, Thurston's hyperbolic Dehn surgery theorem implies that a manifold with m cusps is a limit of a sequence of manifolds with l cusps for any 0 ≤ l < m, so that the isolated points are volumes of compact manifolds, the manifolds with exactly one cusp are limits of compact manifolds, and so on. Together with results of Jørgensen the theorem also proves that any convergent sequence must be obtained by Dehn surgeries on the limit manifold.

=== Quasi-Fuchsian groups ===
Sequences of quasi-fuchsian surface groups of given genus can converge to a doubly degenerate surface group, as in the double limit theorem.
