= Martin Scharlemann =

American mathematician

Martin George Scharlemann (born 6 December 1948) is an American topologist who is a professor at the University of California, Santa Barbara. He obtained his Ph.D. from the University of California, Berkeley under the guidance of Robion Kirby in 1974.

A conference in his honor was held in 2009 at the University of California, Davis. He is a Fellow of the American Mathematical Society, for his "contributions to low-dimensional topology and knot theory."

Abigail Thompson was a student of his. Together they solved the graph planarity problem: There is an algorithm to decide whether a finite graph in 3-space can be moved in 3-space into a plane.

He gave the first proof of the classical theorem that knots with unknotting number one are prime. He used hard combinatorial arguments for this. Simpler proofs are now known.

== Selected publications ==
- "Producing reducible 3-manifolds by surgery on a knot" Topology 29 (1990), no. 4, 481–500.
- with Abigail Thompson, "Heegaard splittings of (surface) x I are standard" Mathematische Annalen 295 (1993), no. 3, 549–564.
- "Sutured manifolds and generalized Thurston norms", Journal of Differential Geometry 29 (1989), no. 3, 557–614.
- with J. Hyam Rubinstein, "Comparing Heegaard splittings of non-Haken 3-manifolds" Topology 35 (1996), no. 4, 1005–1026
- "Unknotting number one knots are prime", Inventiones mathematicae 82 (1985), no. 1, 37–55.
- with Maggy Tomova, "Alternate Heegaard genus bounds distance" Geometry & Topology 10 (2006), 593–617.
- "Local detection of strongly irreducible Heegaard splittings" Topology and its Applications, 1998
- with Abigail Thompson – "Link genus and the Conway moves" Commentarii Mathematici Helvetici, 1989
- "Smooth spheres in $\mathbb{R}^4$ with four critical points are standard" Inventiones mathematicae, 1985
- "Tunnel number one knots satisfy the Poenaru conjecture" Topology and its Applications, 1984
- with A Thompson – "Detecting unknotted graphs in 3-space" Journal of Differential Geometry, 1991
- with A Thompson – "Thin position and Heegaard splittings of the 3-sphere" J. Differential Geom, 1994
