= Julius L. Shaneson =

American mathematician (born 1944)

Julius L. Shaneson (born July 24, 1944, Richmond, Virginia) is an American mathematician. He works at the University of Pennsylvania, where he was department chair from 2002 to 2006 and is currently the Class of 1939 Professor of Mathematics.

== Education and career ==
Shaneson earned his Ph.D. in 1968 from the University of Chicago, under the supervision of Melvin Rothenberg. He taught at Rutgers University before joining the University of Pennsylvania; his students at Rutgers included Abigail Thompson.

== Recognition ==
Shaneson was a Guggenheim Fellow in 1981. He was an invited speaker at the International Congress of Mathematicians in 1982 and 1996. In March 2005, a conference was held at the Courant Institute of Mathematical Sciences of New York University, in honor of his 60th birthday.

He was included in the 2019 class of fellows of the American Mathematical Society "for contributions to topology".

== Selected publications ==
- Shaneson, Julius L. (1969), "Wall's surgery obstruction groups for G × Z", Annals of Mathematics, Second Series, 90 (2): 296–334, doi:10.2307/1970726, JSTOR 1970726, MR 0246310.
- Cappell, Sylvain E.; Shaneson, Julius L. (1974), "The codimension two placement problem and homology equivalent manifolds", Annals of Mathematics, Second Series, 99 (2): 277–348, doi:10.2307/1970901, JSTOR 1970901, MR 0339216.
- Cappell, Sylvain E.; Shaneson, Julius L. (1976), "Some new four-manifolds", Annals of Mathematics, Second Series, 104 (1): 61–72, doi:10.2307/1971056, JSTOR 1971056, MR 0418125.
