= Regina (program) =

- Original authors: Ben Burton, David Letscher, Richard Rannard, Hyam Rubinstein
- Developers: Ben Burton, Ryan Budney, William Pettersson
- Release: December 2000
- Stable release: 7.3 / March, 2023
- Written in: C++, Python
- Operating system: Linux, Unix-like, Mac, Microsoft Windows, iOS
- Available in: English
- Type: Mathematical Software
- License: GPL
- Website: regina-normal.github.io
- Repository: github.com/regina-normal/regina

Regina is a suite of mathematical software for 3-manifold topologists. It focuses upon the study of 3-manifold triangulations and includes support for normal surfaces and angle structures.

== Features ==
- Regina implements a variant of Rubinstein's 3-sphere recognition algorithm. This is an algorithm that determines whether or not a triangulated 3-manifold is homeomorphic to the 3-sphere.
- Regina further implements the connect-sum decomposition. This will decompose a triangulated 3-manifold into a connect-sum of triangulated prime 3-manifolds.
- Homology and Poincaré duality for 3-manifolds, including the torsion linking form.
- Includes portions of the SnapPea kernel for some geometric calculations.
- Has both a GUI and Python interface.

== See also ==
- Computational topology
