= California State Summer School for Mathematics and Science =

Education enrichment program in California, United States

The California State Summer School for Mathematics and Science (COSMOS) is a summer program for high school students in California for the purpose of preparing them for careers in mathematics and sciences. It is often abbreviated COSMOS, although COSMOS does not contain the correct letters to create an accurate abbreviation. The program is hosted by UC Davis, UC Irvine, UC San Diego, UC Santa Cruz, UCLA, and UC Merced.

COSMOS focuses on topics different from the standard high-school curriculum, and does not offer academic credit.

== History ==
COSMOS was established by the California State Legislature in the summer of 2000 to stimulate the interests of and provide opportunities for talented California high school students. The California State Summer School for Mathematics & Science is modeled after the California State Summer School for the Arts.
