= Topological rigidity =

In the mathematical field of topology, a manifold M is called topologically rigid if every manifold homotopically equivalent to M is also homeomorphic to M.

== Motivation ==
A central problem in topology is determining when two spaces are the same i.e. homeomorphic or diffeomorphic. Constructing a morphism explicitly is almost always impractical. If we put further conditions on one or both spaces (manifolds) we can exploit this additional structure in order to show that the desired morphism must exist.

Rigidity theorem is about when a fairly weak equivalence between two manifolds (usually a homotopy equivalence) implies the existence of stronger equivalence homeomorphism, diffeomorphism or isometry.

== Definition. ==
A closed topological manifold M is called topologically rigid if any homotopy equivalence f : N → M with some manifold N as source and M as target is homotopic to a homeomorphism.

== Examples ==
Example 1.
If closed 2-manifolds M and N are homotopically equivalent then they are homeomorphic. Moreover, any homotopy equivalence of closed surfaces deforms to a homeomorphism.

Example 2.
If a closed manifold M^{n} (n ≠ 3) is homotopy-equivalent to S^{n} then M^{n} is homeomorphic to S^{n}.

== Rigidity theorems in geometry ==
=== Definition. ===
A diffeomorphism of flat-Riemannian manifolds is said to be affine iff it carries geodesics to geodesic.

=== Theorem (Bieberbach) ===
If f : M → N is a homotopy equivalence between flat closed connected Riemannian manifolds then f is homotopic to an affine homeomorphism.

=== Mostow's rigidity theorem ===
Theorem: Let M and N be compact, locally symmetric Riemannian manifolds with everywhere non-positive curvature having no closed one or two dimensional geodesic subspace which are direct factor locally. If f : M → N is a homotopy equivalence then f is homotopic to an isometry.

Theorem (Mostow's theorem for hyperbolic n-manifolds, n ≥ 3): If M and N are complete hyperbolic n-manifolds, n ≥ 3 with finite volume and f : M → N is a homotopy equivalence then f is homotopic to an isometry.

These results are named after George Mostow.

=== Algebraic form ===
Let Γ and Δ be discrete subgroups of the isometry group of hyperbolic n-space H, where n ≥ 3, whose quotients H/Γ and H/Δ have finite volume. If Γ and Δ are isomorphic as discrete groups then they are conjugate.

== Remarks ==
(1) In the 2-dimensional case any manifold of genus at least two has a hyperbolic structure. Mostow's rigidity theorem does not apply in this case. In fact, there are many hyperbolic structures on any such manifold; each such structure corresponds to a point in Teichmuller space.

(2) On the other hand, if M and N are 2-manifolds of finite volume then it is easy to show that they are homeomorphic exactly when their fundamental groups are the same.

== Application ==
The group of isometries of a finite-volume hyperbolic n-manifold M is finite. If moreover n ≥ 3, by the Mostow-Prasad rigidity it is isomorphic to Out(π_{1}(M)).
