= Jeremy Kahn =

American mathematician

Jeremy A. Kahn
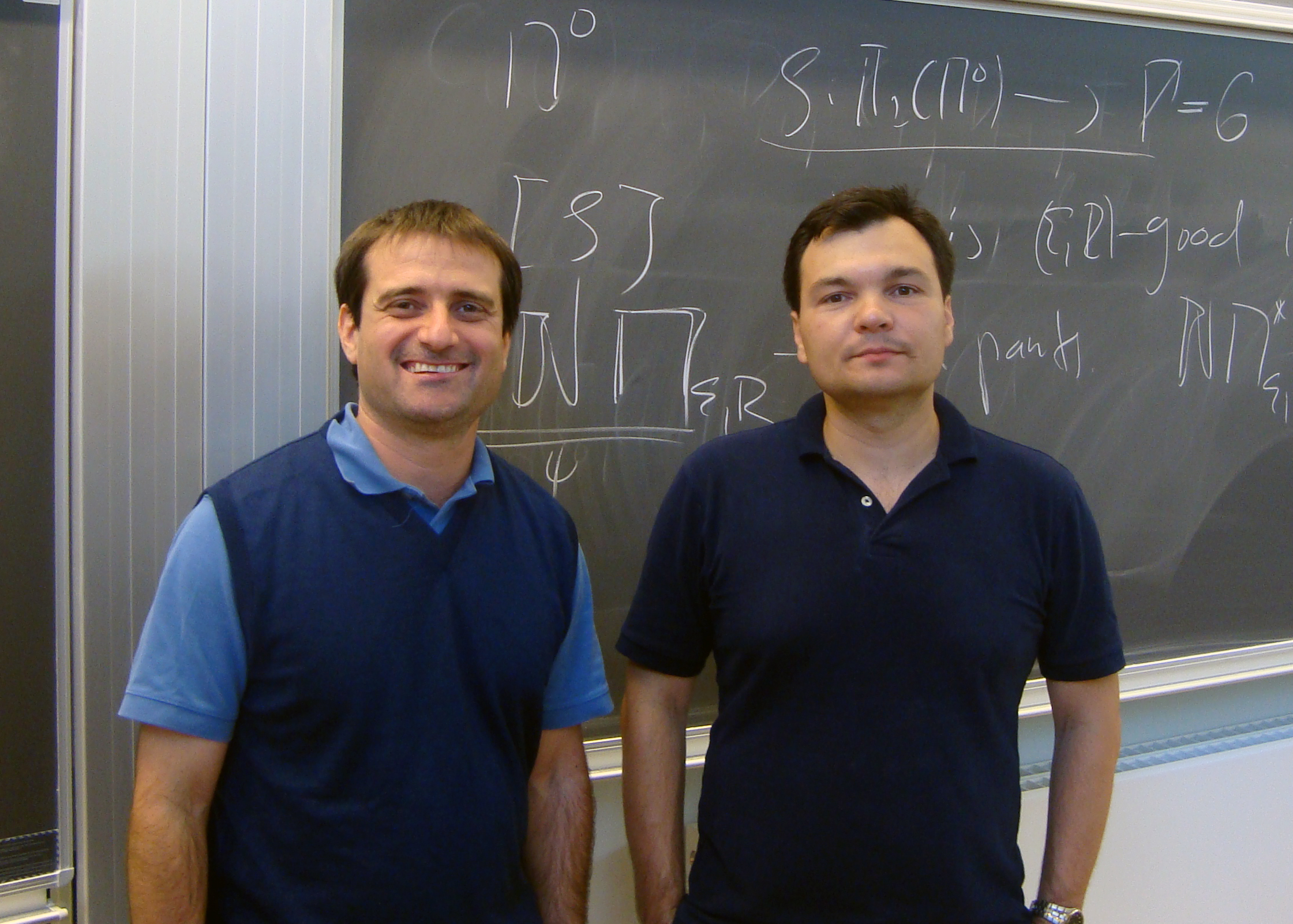
- Jeremy Kahn (left) and Vladimir Markovic
- Born: October 26, 1969 (age 56)
- Education: Harvard University; University of California, Berkeley
- Scientific career
- Fields: Mathematics
- Workplaces: California Institute of Technology; Stony Brook University; Brown University
- Doctoral advisor: Curtis McMullen

Jeremy Adam Kahn (born October 26, 1969) is an American mathematician. He works on hyperbolic geometry, Riemann surfaces and complex dynamics.

== Education ==
Kahn grew up in New York City and attended Hunter College High School. He was a child prodigy who mastered quadratic equations at the age of 7, at the age of 8 designed an equation identical to the one Carl Gauss designed at the age of 9, and proved the Pythagorean Theorem at the age of 10. Kahn was part of the Johns Hopkins University Study of Mathematically Precocious Youth longitudinal cohort. At the age of 11, he scored a 780 out of a possible 800 on the math portion of the SAT-I exam. At the age of 13, he became the youngest person ever to make the United States International Mathematical Olympiad team He participated in the Olympiad four times, winning silver medals in 1983 and 1984, and gold medals in 1985 and 1986.

On the basis of his success in the Putnam competition, he became a Putnam Fellow in 1988. He received a bachelor's degree in mathematics at Harvard University, then received his Ph.D. from the University of California, Berkeley in 1995 under Curtis McMullen with the thesis Holomorphic removability of quadratic polynomial Julia sets.

== Career ==
Kahn was an assistant professor at the California Institute of Technology from 1995 to 1998 and was later a postdoc at the University of Toronto. After that, he worked for the investment firm Highbridge Capital Management as an analyst in financial mathematics. He was a lecturer and later assistant professor at Stony Brook University. He is currently a professor of mathematics at Brown University.

In 2012, Kahn and Vladimir Markovic received the Clay Research Award for their research on hyperbolic geometry, specifically, for their result on immersions into a closed hyperbolic 3-manifold (proof of the surface subgroup conjecture) and for their proof of the Ehrenpreis conjecture.

In 2014 he was an invited speaker at the International Congress of Mathematicians in Seoul and gave a talk called "The Surface Subgroup and the Ehrenpreis Conjectures".

== Selected publications ==
- Kahn, Jeremy; Markovic, Vladimir (2012). "Immersing almost geodesic surfaces in a closed hyperbolic three manifold". Annals of Mathematics. 2. 175 (3): 1127–1190. arXiv:0910.5501. doi:10.4007/annals.2012.175.3.4. MR 2912704. S2CID 32593851.
- Avila, Artur; Kahn, Jeremy; Lyubich, Mikhail; Shen, Weixiao (2009). "Combinatorial rigidity for unicritical polynomials". Annals of Mathematics. 170 (2): 783–797. arXiv:math/0507240. doi:10.4007/annals.2009.170.783. JSTOR 25662159. MR 2552107. S2CID 12631168.
