= Normal surface =

In mathematics, a normal surface is a surface inside a triangulated 3-manifold that intersects each tetrahedron in several components called normal disks. Each normal disk is either a triangle which cuts off a vertex of the tetrahedron, or a quadrilateral which separates pairs of vertices. In a given tetrahedron there cannot be two quadrilaterals separating different pairs of vertices, since such quadrilaterals would intersect in a line, causing the surface to be self-intersecting.

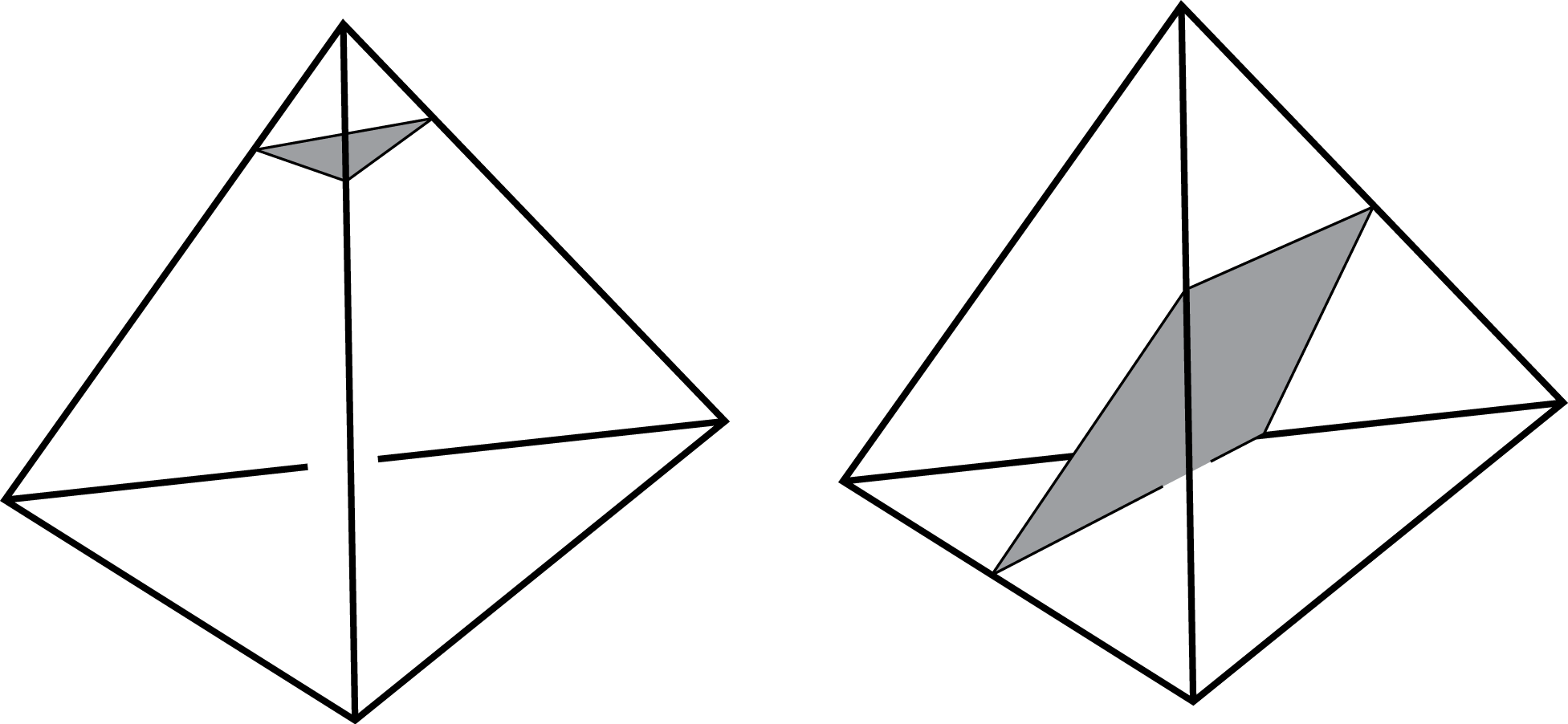
A normal surface intersects a tetrahedron in (possibly many) triangles (see above left) and quadrilaterals (see above right)

Dually, a normal surface can be considered as a surface that intersects each handle of a given handle structure on the 3-manifold in a prescribed manner, similar to the above.

The concept of a normal surface can be generalized to arbitrary polyhedra. There are also related notions of almost normal surfaces and spun normal surfaces.

In an almost normal surface, one tetrahedron in the triangulation has a single exceptional piece. This is either an octagon that separates pairs of vertices, or an annulus that connects two triangles and/or quadrilaterals by a tube.

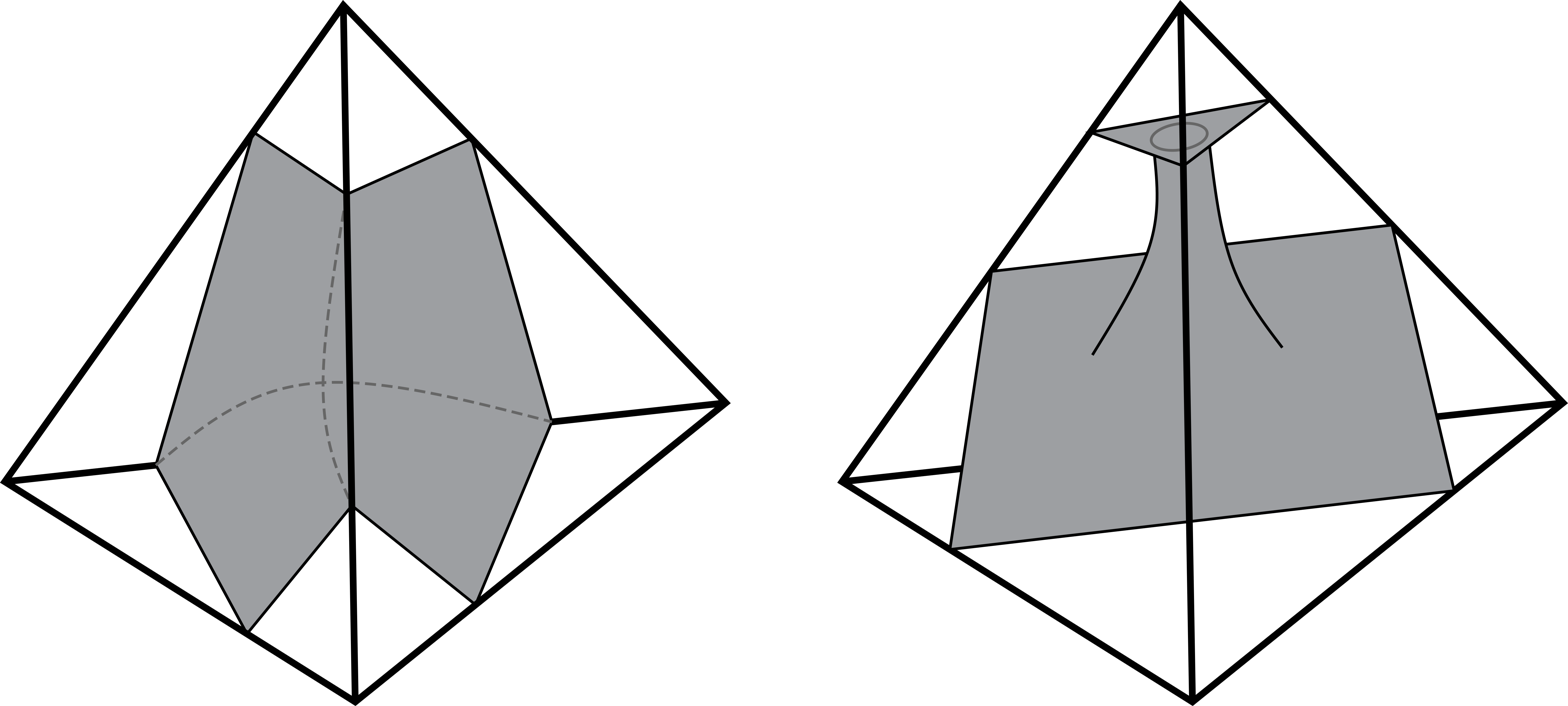
An example of an octagon and annulus piece in an almost normal surface

The concept of normal surfaces is due to Hellmuth Kneser, who utilized it in his proof of the prime decomposition theorem for 3-manifolds. Later, Wolfgang Haken extended and refined the notion to create normal surface theory, which forms the basis of many algorithms in 3-manifold theory. The notion of almost normal surfaces is due to Hyam Rubinstein. The notion of spun normal surface is due to Bill Thurston.

Regina is software that enumerates normal and almost-normal surfaces in triangulated 3-manifolds, implementing Rubinstein's 3-sphere recognition algorithm, among other functionalities.
