= Prime decomposition of 3-manifolds =

In mathematics, the prime decomposition theorem for 3-manifolds states that every compact, orientable 3-manifold is the connected sum of a unique (up to homeomorphism) finite collection of prime 3-manifolds.

A manifold is prime if it is not homeomorphic to any connected sum of manifolds, except for the trivial connected sum of the manifold with a sphere of the same dimension, $M \cong M \# S^n$. If $P$ is a prime 3-manifold then either it is $S^2 \times S^1$ or the non-orientable $S^2$ bundle over $S^1,$ or it is irreducible, which means that any embedded 2-sphere bounds a ball. So the theorem can be restated to say that there is a unique connected sum decomposition into irreducible 3-manifolds and fiber bundles of $S^2$ over $S^1.$

The prime decomposition holds also for non-orientable 3-manifolds, but the uniqueness statement must be modified slightly. Every compact, non-orientable 3-manifold is a connected sum of irreducible 3-manifolds and non-orientable $S^2$ bundles over $S^1.$ This sum is unique as long as we specify that each summand is either irreducible or a non-orientable $S^2$ bundle over $S^1.$

The proof is based on normal surface techniques originated by Hellmuth Kneser. Existence was proven by Kneser, but the exact formulation and proof of the uniqueness was done more than 30 years later by John Milnor.
