= Smale =

Smale is a surname. Notable people with the surname include:

- Bob Smale, American pianist on The Lawrence Welk Show
- John G. Smale (1927-2011), American businessman
- Sir John Jackson Smale (1805-1882), British lawyer and Chief Justice of Hong Kong
- Stephen Smale, American mathematician
- Holly Smale, British author
