= Rational homology sphere =

Manifold with the same rational homology groups as a sphere

In algebraic topology, a rational homology $n$-sphere is an $n$-dimensional manifold with the same rational homology groups as the $n$-sphere. These serve, among other things, to understand which information the rational homology groups of a space can or cannot measure and which attenuations result from neglecting torsion in comparison to the (integral) homology groups of the space.

== Definition ==
A rational homology $n$-sphere is an $n$-dimensional manifold $\Sigma$ with the same rational homology groups as the $n$-sphere $S^n$:

$$H_k(\Sigma,\mathbb{Q})
=H_k(S^n,\mathbb{Q})
\cong\begin{cases}
\mathbb{Q} & ;k=0\text{ or }k=n \\
1 & ;\text{otherwise}
\end{cases}.$$

== Properties ==
- Every (integral) homology sphere is a rational homology sphere.
- Every simply connected rational homology $n$-sphere with $n\leq 4$ is homeomorphic to the $n$-sphere.

== Examples ==
- The $n$-sphere $S^n$ itself is obviously a rational homology $n$-sphere.
- The pseudocircle (for which a weak homotopy equivalence from the circle exists) is a rational homotopy $1$-sphere, which is not a homotopy $1$-sphere.
- The Klein bottle has two dimensions, but has the same rational homology as the $1$-sphere as its (integral) homology groups are given by:
  $$H_0(K)
\cong\mathbb{Z}$$
  $$H_1(K)
\cong\mathbb{Z}\oplus\mathbb{Z}_2$$
  $$H_2(K)
\cong 1$$

Hence it is not a rational homology sphere, but would be if the requirement to be of same dimension was dropped.

- The real projective space $\R P^n$ is a rational homology sphere for $n$ odd as its (integral) homology groups are given by:
  $$H_k(\R P^n)
\cong\begin{cases}
\mathbb{Z} & ;k=0\text{ or }k=n\text{ if odd} \\
\mathbb{Z}_2 & ;k\text{ odd},0<k<n \\
1 & ;\text{otherwise}
\end{cases}.$$

$\R P^1\cong S^1$ is the sphere in particular.

- The five-dimensional Wu manifold $W=\operatorname{SU}(3)/\operatorname{SO}(3)$ is a simply connected rational homology sphere (with non-trivial homology groups $H_0(W)\cong\mathbb{Z}$, $H_2(W)\cong\mathbb{Z}_2$ und $H_5(W)\cong\mathbb{Z}$), which is not a homotopy sphere.

== See also ==
- Rational homotopy sphere

== Literature ==
- Hatcher, Allen (2002), Algebraic Topology, Cambridge University Press, ISBN 0-521-79540-0, archived from the original on June 16, 2006
