= Daniel Wise (mathematician) =

American mathematician (born 1971)

Daniel Wise FRS FRSC
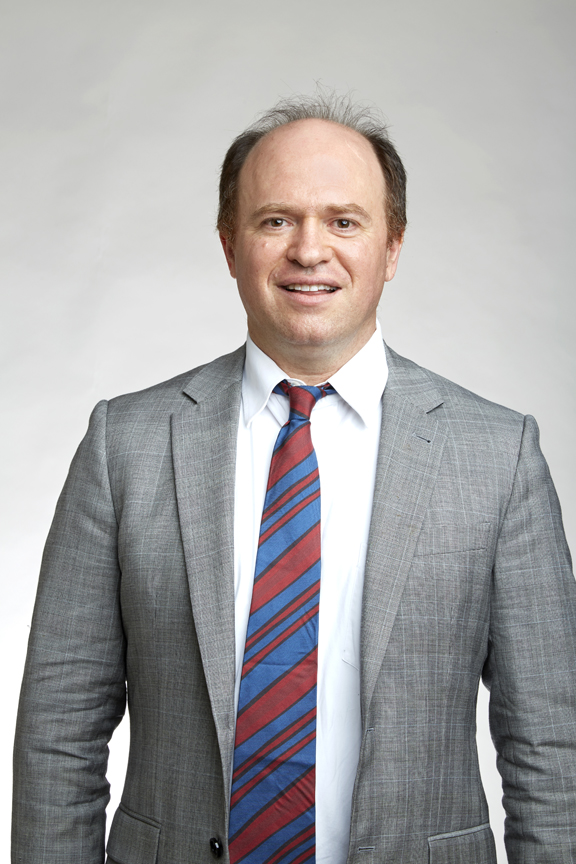
- Wise in 2018
- Born: Daniel T. Wise; January 24, 1971 (age 55)
- Education: Princeton University (PhD)
- Awards: CRM-Fields-PIMS prize
- Scientific career
- Thesis: Non-positively curved squared complexes, aperiodic tilings, and non-residually finite groups (1996)
- Doctoral advisor: Martin Bridson
- Website: www.math.mcgill.ca/wise

Daniel Tzvi Wise (born January 24, 1971) is an American mathematician who specializes in geometric group theory and 3-manifolds. He is a professor of mathematics at McGill University. Wise's conjecture is named after him.

== Education ==
Daniel Wise obtained his PhD from Princeton University in 1996 supervised by Martin Bridson. His thesis was titled non-positively curved squared complexes, aperiodic tilings, and non-residually finite groups.

== Career and research ==
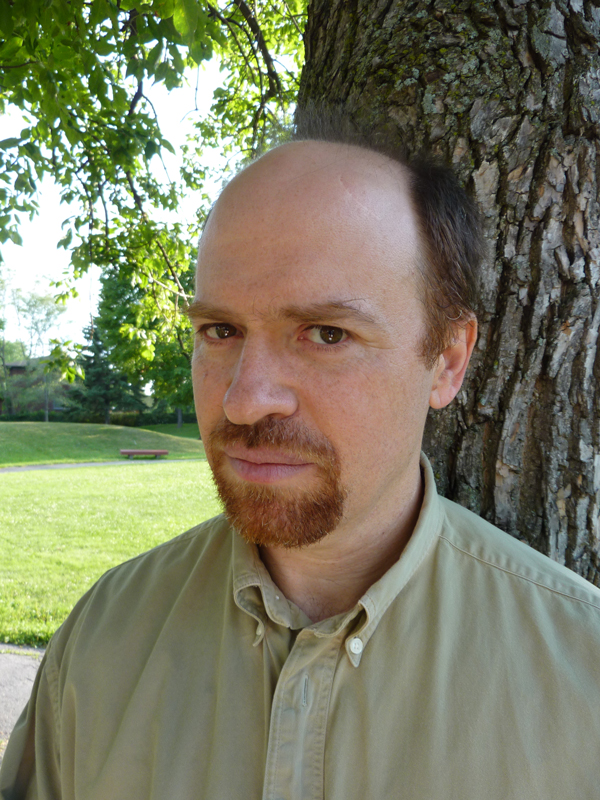
Daniel T. Wise

Wise's research has focused on the role of non-positively curved cube complexes within geometric group theory and their interplay with residual finiteness. His early work was taken to higher dimensions when he introduced with Frédéric Haglund the theory of special cube complexes. In 2009 he announced a solution to the virtually fibered conjecture for cusped hyperbolic 3-manifolds. This was a consequence of his work on the structure of groups with a quasiconvex hierarchy which proved the virtual specialness of a broad class of hyperbolic groups, and established a program for using cube complexes to understand many infinite groups. This subsequently played a key role in the proof of the Virtually Haken conjecture.

=== Selected publications ===
- Wise, Daniel T (2004). "Cubulating Small Cancellation Groups". Geom. Funct. Anal. 14: 150–214. doi:10.1007/s00039-004-0454-y. S2CID 119826713.
- Wise, Daniel T (2002). "The residual finiteness of negatively curved polygons of finite groups". Invent. Math. 149 (3): 579–617. Bibcode:2002InMat.149..579W. doi:10.1007/s002220200224. S2CID 122345756.
- Haglund, Frédéric; Wise, Daniel T. (2012). "A combination theorem for special cube complexes". Annals of Mathematics. 176 (3): 1427–1482. doi:10.4007/annals.2012.176.3.2.
- Wise, Daniel T. From Riches to Raags: 3-Manifolds, Right-Angled Artin Groups and Cubical Geometry (AMS Lecture Notes, 2012).
- Bergeron, Nicolas; Wise, Daniel T. (2012). "A Boundary Criterion for Cubulation". American Journal of Mathematics. 134 (3): 843–859. arXiv:0908.3609. doi:10.1353/ajm.2012.0020. S2CID 14128842.
- Wise, Daniel T (2021). The Structure of Groups with a Quasiconvex Hierarchy. Annals of Mathematics Studies. Princeton University Press. doi:10.1515/9780691213507.

=== Awards and honors ===
In 2016 he was awarded the Jeffery–Williams Prize and the CRM-Fields-PIMS Prize. In 2016 Wise was awarded a Guggenheim Fellowship. He was elected a Fellow of the Royal Society of Canada (FRSC) in 2014 and a Fellow of the Royal Society (FRS) in 2018. For the theory of special cube complexes and his establishment of subgroup separability for a wide class of groups, Daniel Wise together with Ian Agol was awarded in 2013 the Oswald Veblen Prize in Geometry. In 2019, he was awarded the Lobachevsky Prize for his contributions to the virtual Haken conjecture.
