= William Jaco =

American mathematician

William H. Jaco
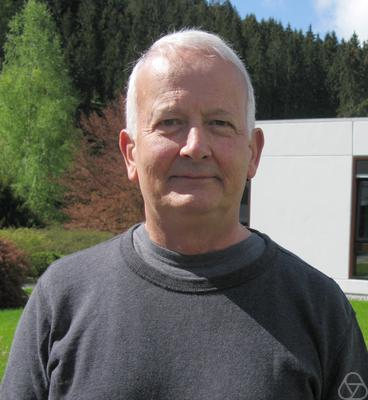
- William Jaco at Oberwolfach in 2012
- Born: July 14, 1940 (age 86); Grafton, West Virginia, U.S.
- Education: B.A., Fairmont State College; M.A., Pennsylvania State University; Ph.D (1968) University of Wisconsin-Madison
- Known for: JSJ decomposition
- Awards: Grace B. Kerr Professor
- Scientific career
- Fields: Mathematics, Topology, and Geometry
- Workplaces: Rice University, Oklahoma State University
- Doctoral students: Krystyna Kuperberg

William Howard Jaco (born July 14, 1940) is an American mathematician who is known for his role in the Jaco–Shalen–Johannson decomposition theorem and efficient triangulations of 3-manifolds. He retired from Oklahoma State University in 2021 as Regents Professor Emeritus and was appointed adjunct professor at Rice University in 2021.

== Education and career ==
Jaco received a B.A from the Fairmont State College and an M.A. from Pennsylvania State University. He completed his Ph.D. in 1968 at the University of Wisconsin-Madison.

He held faculty positions at the University of Michigan and Rice University before joining the faculty at Oklahoma State University as Head of the Mathematics Dept. from 1982 to 1987 and again served as head from 2011 to 2018. He has been a member of the Institute for Advanced Study, (IAS) the Mathematical Sciences Research Institute (MSRI), and the American Institute of Mathematics (AIM).

He served as the executive director of the American Mathematical Society (AMS), the Chair-elect, chair, and Retiring Chair of the Mathematics Section of the American Association for the Advancement of Science, as a member of the advisory board of the American Institute of Mathematics, as a member of the Board of Mathematical Sciences at the National Research Council/National Academy of Sciences, as a member of the Joint Policy Board for Mathematics. He was an elected member of the Board of Trustees of the American Mathematical Society serving as the chair of the Board of Trustees, 2014–2015.

One of his doctoral students (joint with Karol Borsuk) was Krystyna Kuperberg.

== Awards and honors ==
In 1998 he was elected fellow of the American Association for the Advancement of Science (AAAS) and in 2012 he became a fellow of the American Mathematical Society where he is an Honorary Life Member. He is an Honorary Associate Member of the Moscow Mathematical Society and has received Honorary Recognition for Service to St. Petersburg and Russian Mathematics and Mathematicians. He was elected Honorary Member of Phi Beta Kappa in 2020.

Jaco has held the distinguished positions of Regents Professor (2008) and Grace B. Kerr Professor at Oklahoma State University where he was recognized as the 2017 Eminent Faculty Member and in 2019 recognized as Regents Distinguished Research Faculty member. He has also held the Lois and Fred Gehring Distinguished Visitor Chair at University of Michigan. To commemorate Jaco's 70th birthday and his career as a mathematician, Oklahoma State University held a conference in topology called Jacofest in June 2010. He was elected an honorary member of Phi Beta Kappa, Beta Chapter of Oklahoma, and inducted into the Oklahoma Higher Education Hall of Fame, both in 2019.

== Research ==
His mathematical research is in Geometry and Topology where he studies low-dimensional manifolds, decision problems, algorithms and complexity theory. He is best known for the Jaco–Shalen–Johannson decomposition Theorem, his work on normal surfaces, and the co-discovery of efficient triangulations.

== Publications ==
- William Jaco Lectures on Three-Manifold Topology ISBN 0-8218-1693-4
- W. H. Jaco, P. B. Shalen Seifert Fibered Spaces in Three Manifolds: Memoirs Series No. 220 (Memoirs of the American Mathematical Society; v. 21, no. 220) ISBN 0-8218-2220-9
- William Jaco, J. Hyam Rubinstein, & Stephan Tillman "Z2 –Thurston Norm and Complexity of 3–Manifolds"
- William Jaco, J. Hyam Rubinstein, & Stephan Tillman "Coverings and Minimal Triangulations of 3–Manifolds"
- William Jaco, J. Hyam Rubinstein, & Stephan Tillman "Minimal triangulations for an infinite family of lens spaces"
- William Jaco, J. Hyam Rubinstein, & Eric Sedgwick "Finding planar surfaces in knot- and link-manifolds"
- William Jaco & J. Hyam Rubinstein "Layered-triangulations of 3-manifolds"
- William Jaco & J. Hyam Rubinstein "0-efficient triangulations of three-manifolds"
- William Jaco & Eric Sedgwick "Decision problems in the space of Dehn fillings"
- William Jaco, J. Hyam Rubinstein, & David Letscher "Algorithms for essential surfaces in 3-manifolds"
