= Vladimir Markovic =

Mathematician and university professor

Vladimir Marković
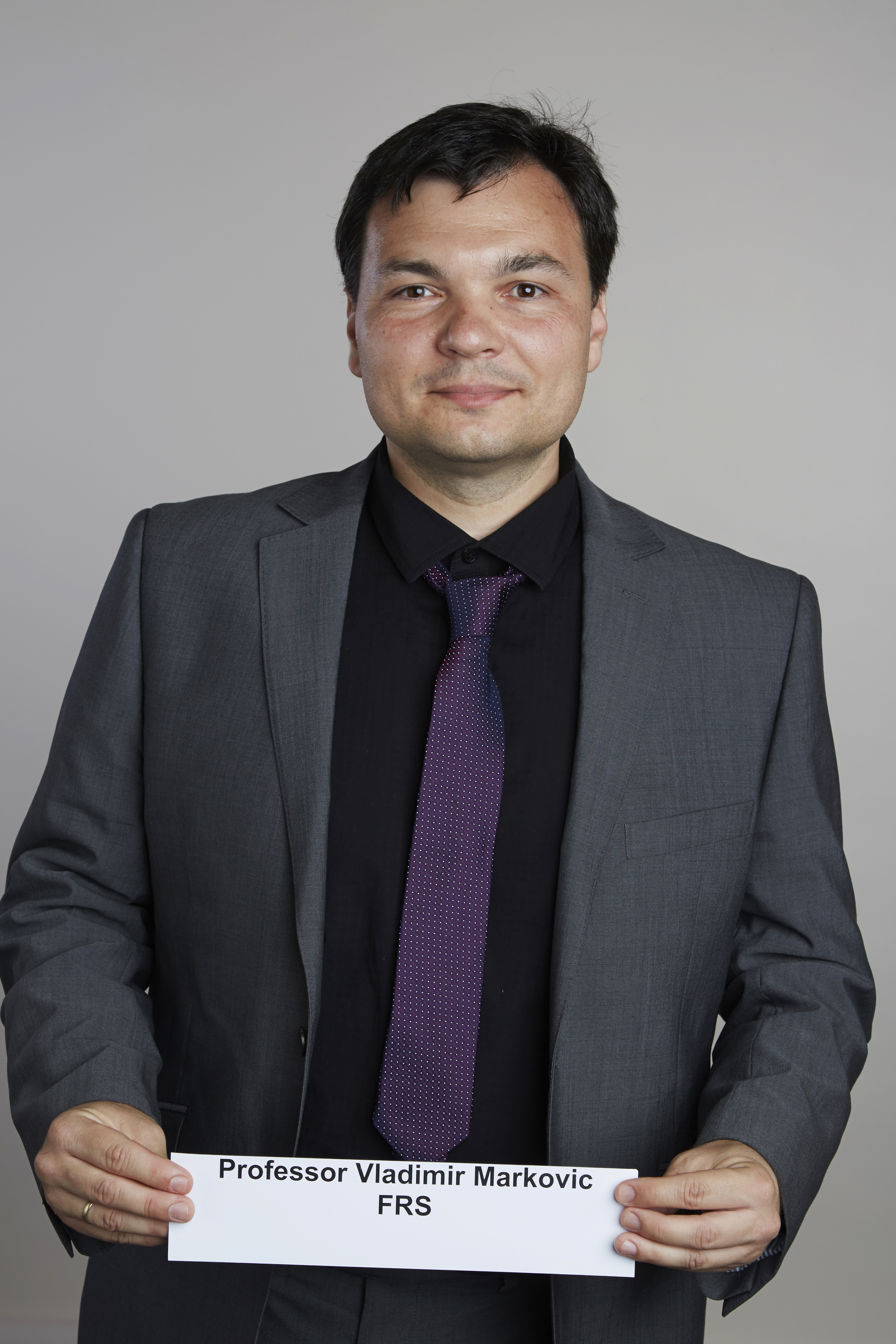
- Vladimir Marković in 2014, portrait via the Royal Society
- Born: Vladimir Marković; October 1973 (age 52–53); Germany
- Citizenship: British
- Education: University of Belgrade (BSc, PhD)
- Known for: Surface subgroup conjecture Ehrenpreis conjecture
- Awards: Simons Investigators Award (2016); FRS (2014); Wolfson Research Merit Award (2014); Clay Research Award (2012); Whitehead Prize (2004); Leverhulme Prize (2004)
- Scientific career
- Fields: Quasiconformal mapping; Low-dimensional topology; Dynamical systems; Functional analysis; Geometric analysis
- Workplaces: University of Cambridge; Caltech; University of Warwick; Stony Brook University; University of Minnesota
- Thesis: Jedinstveno ekstremalna kvazikonformna preslikavanja i stacionarne tačke integrala energije (1998)
- Website: people.maths.ox.ac.uk/~markovic

Vladimir Marković is a Professor of Mathematics at University of Oxford. He was previously the John D. MacArthur Professor at the California Institute of Technology (2013–2020) and Sadleirian Professor of Pure Mathematics at the University of Cambridge (2013–2014).

== Education ==
Marković was educated at the University of Belgrade where he was awarded a Bachelor of Science degree in 1995 and a PhD in 1998.

== Career and research ==
Previously, Marković has held positions at the University of Warwick, Stony Brook University and the University of Minnesota. Marković is editor of Proceedings of the London Mathematical Society.

Marković's research interests are in low-dimensional geometry, topology and dynamics and functional and geometric analysis.

== Awards and honours ==
Marković was elected a Fellow of the Royal Society (FRS) in 2014. His nomination reads:

Markovic is a world leader in the area of quasiconformal homeomorphisms and low dimensional topology and geometry. He has solved many famous and difficult problems. With Jeremy Kahn, he proved William Thurston's key conjecture that every closed hyperbolic 3-manifold contains an almost geodesic immersed surface.

Marković was also awarded the Clay Research Award in 2012, Whitehead Prize and Philip Leverhulme Prize in 2004.

In Fall of 2015 Marković worked as an Institute for Advanced Study member. In 2016 he received a Simons Investigator Award.
