= Hyperbolization theorem =

Theorem in geometry

In geometry, Thurston's geometrization theorem or hyperbolization theorem implies that closed atoroidal Haken manifolds are hyperbolic, and in particular satisfy the Thurston conjecture.

== Statement ==
One form of the hyperbolization theorem states: If M is a compact irreducible atoroidal Haken manifold whose boundary has zero Euler characteristic, then the interior of M has a complete hyperbolic structure of finite volume.

The Mostow rigidity theorem implies that if a manifold of dimension at least 3 has a hyperbolic structure of finite volume, then it is essentially unique.

The conditions that the manifold M should be irreducible and atoroidal are necessary, as hyperbolic manifolds have these properties. However the condition that the manifold be Haken is unnecessarily strong. Thurston's hyperbolization conjecture states that a closed irreducible atoroidal 3-manifold with infinite fundamental group is hyperbolic, and this follows from Perelman's proof of the Thurston geometrization conjecture.

== Manifolds with boundary ==
Thurston (1982, 2.3) showed that if a compact 3 manifold is prime, homotopically atoroidal, and has non-empty boundary, then it has a complete hyperbolic structure unless it is homeomorphic to a certain manifold (T^{2}×[0,1])/Z/2Z with boundary T^{2}.

A hyperbolic structure on the interior of a compact orientable 3-manifold has finite volume if and only if all boundary components are tori, except for the manifold T^{2}×[0,1] which has a hyperbolic structure but none of finite volume (Thurston 1982, p. 359).

== Proofs ==
Thurston never published a complete proof of his theorem for reasons that he explained in (Thurston 1994), though parts of his argument are contained in Thurston (1986, 1998a, 1998b). Wall (1984) and Morgan (1984) gave summaries of Thurston's proof. Otal (1996) gave a proof in the case of manifolds that fiber over the circle, and Otal (1998) and Kapovich (2009) gave proofs for the generic case of manifolds that do not fiber over the circle. Thurston's geometrization theorem also follows from Perelman's proof using Ricci flow of the more general Thurston geometrization conjecture.

== Manifolds that fiber over the circle ==
Thurston's original argument for this case was summarized by Sullivan (1981). Otal (1996) gave a proof in the case of manifolds that fiber over the circle.

Thurston's geometrization theorem in this special case states that if M is a 3-manifold that fibers over the circle and whose monodromy is a pseudo-Anosov diffeomorphism, then the interior of M has a complete hyperbolic metric of finite volume.

== Manifolds that do not fiber over the circle ==
Otal (1998) and Kapovich (2009) gave proofs of Thurston's theorem for the generic case of manifolds that do not fiber over the circle.

The idea of the proof is to cut a Haken manifold M along an incompressible surface, to obtain a new manifold N. By induction one assumes that the interior of N has a hyperbolic structure, and the problem is to modify it so that it can be extended to the boundary of N and glued together. Thurston showed that this follows from the existence of a fixed point for a map of Teichmuller space called the skinning map. The core of the proof of the geometrization theorem is to prove that if N is not an interval bundle over a surface and M is atoroidal then the skinning map has a fixed point. (If N is an interval bundle then the skinning map has no fixed point, which is why one needs a separate argument when M fibers over the circle.) McMullen (1990) gave a new proof of the existence of a fixed point of the skinning map.
