= Surface bundle over the circle =

In mathematics, a surface bundle over the circle is a fiber bundle with base space a circle, and with fiber space a surface. Therefore the total space has dimension 2 + 1 = 3. In general, fiber bundles over the circle are a special case of mapping tori.

Here is the construction: take the Cartesian product of a surface with the unit interval. Glue the two copies of the surface, on the boundary, by some homeomorphism. This homeomorphism is called the monodromy of the surface bundle. It is possible to show that the homeomorphism type of the bundle obtained depends only on the conjugacy class, in the mapping class group, of the gluing homeomorphism chosen.

This construction is an important source of examples both in the field of low-dimensional topology as well as in geometric group theory. In the former we find that the geometry of the three-manifold is determined by the dynamics of the homeomorphism. This is the fibered part of William Thurston's geometrization theorem for Haken manifolds, whose proof requires the Nielsen–Thurston classification for surface homeomorphisms as well as deep results in the theory of Kleinian groups. In geometric group theory the fundamental groups of such bundles give an important class of HNN-extensions: that is, extensions of the fundamental group of the fiber (a surface) by the integers.

A simple special case of this construction (considered in Henri Poincaré's foundational paper) is that of a torus bundle.

== See also ==
- Virtually fibered conjecture
