= 2-sided =

Maths

In mathematics, specifically in topology of manifolds, a compact codimension-one submanifold $F$ of a manifold $M$ is said to be 2-sided in $M$ when there is an embedding

$$h\colon F\times [-1,1]\to M$$

with $h(x,0)=x$ for each $x\in F$ and

$$h(F\times [-1,1])\cap \partial M=h(\partial F\times [-1,1])$$.

In other words, if its normal bundle is trivial.

This means, for example that a curve in a surface is 2-sided if it has a tubular neighborhood which is a cartesian product of the curve times an interval.

A submanifold which is not 2-sided is called 1-sided.

== Examples ==
=== Surfaces ===
For curves on surfaces, a curve is 2-sided if and only if it preserves orientation, and 1-sided if and only if it reverses orientation: a tubular neighborhood is then a Möbius strip. This can be determined from the class of the curve in the fundamental group of the surface and the orientation character on the fundamental group, which identifies which curves reverse orientation.

- An embedded circle in the plane is 2-sided.
- An embedded circle generating the fundamental group of the real projective plane (such as an "equator" of the projective plane – the image of an equator for the sphere) is 1-sided, as it is orientation-reversing.

== Properties ==
Cutting along a 2-sided manifold can separate a manifold into two pieces – such as cutting along the equator of a sphere or around the sphere on which a connected sum has been done – but need not, such as cutting along a curve on the torus.

Cutting along a (connected) 1-sided manifold does not separate a manifold, as a point that is locally on one side of the manifold can be connected to a point that is locally on the other side (i.e., just across the submanifold) by passing along an orientation-reversing path.

Cutting along a 1-sided manifold may make a non-orientable manifold orientable – such as cutting along an equator of the real projective plane – but may not, such as cutting along a 1-sided curve in a higher genus non-orientable surface, maybe the simplest example of this is seen when one cut a mobius band along its core curve.
