= Prime manifold =

Type of n-manifold in topology

In topology, a branch of mathematics, a prime manifold is an n-manifold that cannot be expressed as a non-trivial connected sum of two n-manifolds. Non-trivial means that neither of the two is an n-sphere. A similar notion is that of an irreducible n-manifold, which is one in which any embedded (n − 1)-sphere bounds an embedded n-ball. Implicit in this definition is the use of a suitable category, such as the category of differentiable manifolds or the category of piecewise-linear manifolds.

A 3-manifold is irreducible if and only if it is prime, except for two cases: the product $S^2 \times S^1$ and the non-orientable fiber bundle of the 2-sphere over the circle $S^1$ are both prime but not irreducible. This is somewhat analogous to the notion in algebraic number theory of prime ideals generalizing Irreducible elements.

According to a theorem of Hellmuth Kneser and John Milnor, every compact, orientable 3-manifold is the connected sum of a unique (up to homeomorphism) collection of prime 3-manifolds.

== Definitions ==
Consider specifically 3-manifolds.

=== Irreducible manifold ===
A 3-manifold is irreducible if every smooth sphere bounds a ball. More rigorously, a differentiable connected 3-manifold $M$ is irreducible if every differentiable submanifold $S$ homeomorphic to a sphere bounds a subset $D$ (that is, $S=\partial D$) which is homeomorphic to the closed ball
$$D^3 = \{x\in\R^3\ |\ |x|\leq 1\}.$$
The assumption of differentiability of $M$ is not important, because every topological 3-manifold has a unique differentiable structure. However it is necessary to assume that the sphere is smooth (a differentiable submanifold), even having a tubular neighborhood. The differentiability assumption serves to exclude pathologies like the Alexander's horned sphere (see below).

A 3-manifold that is not irreducible is called reducible.

=== Prime manifolds ===
A connected 3-manifold $M$ is prime if it cannot be expressed as a connected sum $N_1\# N_2$ of two manifolds neither of which is the 3-sphere $S^3$ (or, equivalently, neither of which is homeomorphic to $M$).

== Examples ==
=== Euclidean space ===
Three-dimensional Euclidean space $\R^3$ is irreducible: all smooth 2-spheres in it bound balls.

On the other hand, Alexander's horned sphere is a non-smooth sphere in $\R^3$ that does not bound a ball. Thus the stipulation that the sphere be smooth is necessary.

=== Sphere, lens spaces ===
The 3-sphere $S^3$ is irreducible. The product space $S^2 \times S^1$ is not irreducible, since any 2-sphere $S^2 \times \{pt\}$ (where $pt$ is some point of $S^1$) has a connected complement which is not a ball (it is the product of the 2-sphere and a line).

A lens space $L(p,q)$ with $p\neq 0$ (and thus not the same as $S^2 \times S^1$) is irreducible.

== Prime manifolds and irreducible manifolds ==
A 3-manifold is irreducible if and only if it is prime, except for two cases: the product $S^2 \times S^1$ and the non-orientable fiber bundle of the 2-sphere over the circle $S^1$ are both prime but not irreducible.

=== From irreducible to prime ===
An irreducible manifold $M$ is prime. Indeed, if we express $M$ as a connected sum
$$M=N_1\#N_2,$$
then $M$ is obtained by removing a ball each from $N_1$ and from $N_2,$ and then gluing the two resulting 2-spheres together. These two (now united) 2-spheres form a 2-sphere in $M.$ The fact that $M$ is irreducible means that this 2-sphere must bound a ball. Undoing the gluing operation, either $N_1$ or $N_2$ is obtained by gluing that ball to the previously removed ball on their borders. This operation though simply gives a 3-sphere. This means that one of the two factors $N_1$ or $N_2$ was in fact a (trivial) 3-sphere, and $M$ is thus prime.

=== From prime to irreducible ===
Let $M$ be a prime 3-manifold, and let $S$ be a 2-sphere embedded in it. Cutting on $S$ one may obtain just one manifold $N$ or perhaps one can only obtain two manifolds $M_1$ and $M_2.$ In the latter case, gluing balls onto the newly created spherical boundaries of these two manifolds gives two manifolds $N_1$ and $N_2$ such that
$$M = N_1\#N_2.$$
Since $M$ is prime, one of these two, say $N_1,$ is $S^3.$ This means $M_1$ is $S^3$ minus a ball, and is therefore a ball itself. The sphere $S$ is thus the border of a ball, and since we are looking at the case where only this possibility exists (two manifolds created) the manifold $M$ is irreducible.

It remains to consider the case where it is possible to cut $M$ along $S$ and obtain just one piece, $N.$ In that case there exists a closed simple curve $\gamma$ in $M$ intersecting $S$ at a single point. Let $R$ be the union of the two tubular neighborhoods of $S$ and $\gamma.$ The boundary $\partial R$ turns out to be a 2-sphere that cuts $M$ into two pieces, $R$ and the complement of $R.$ Since $M$ is prime and $R$ is not a ball, the complement must be a ball. The manifold $M$ that results from this fact is almost determined, and a careful analysis shows that it is either $S^2 \times S^1$ or else the other, non-orientable, fiber bundle of $S^2$ over $S^1.$

== See also ==
- 3-manifold
- Connected sum
- Prime decomposition (3-manifold)
