= Surgery exact sequence =

Tool to classify manifolds within a homotopy type in dim > 4

In the mathematical surgery theory, the surgery exact sequence is the main technical tool to calculate the surgery structure set of a compact manifold in dimension $>4$. The surgery structure set $\mathcal{S} (X)$ of a compact $n$-dimensional manifold $X$ is a pointed set which classifies $n$-dimensional manifolds within the homotopy type of $X$.

The basic idea is that in order to calculate $\mathcal{S} (X)$ it is enough to understand the other terms in the exact sequence, which are usually easier to determine. These are on one hand the normal invariants which form generalized cohomology groups, and hence one can use standard tools of algebraic topology to calculate them at least in principle. On the other hand, there are the L-groups which are defined algebraically in terms of quadratic forms or in terms of chain complexes with quadratic structure. A great deal is known about these groups. Another part of the sequence are the surgery obstruction maps from normal invariants to the L-groups. For these maps there are certain characteristic classes formulas, which enable to calculate them in some cases. Knowledge of these three components, that means: the normal maps, the L-groups and the surgery obstruction maps is enough to determine the structure set (at least up to extension problems).

In practice one has to proceed case by case, for each manifold $\mathcal{} X$ it is a unique task to determine the surgery exact sequence, see some examples below. Also note that there are versions of the surgery exact sequence depending on the category of manifolds we work with: smooth (DIFF), PL, or topological manifolds and whether we take Whitehead torsion into account or not (decorations $s$ or $h$).

The original 1962 work of Browder and Novikov on the existence and uniqueness of manifolds within a simply-connected homotopy type was reformulated by Sullivan in 1966 as a surgery exact sequence. In 1970 Wall developed non-simply-connected surgery theory and the surgery exact sequence for manifolds with arbitrary fundamental group.

== Definition ==
The surgery exact sequence is defined as

$$\cdots \to \mathcal{N}_\partial (X \times I) \to L_{n+1} (\pi_1 (X)) \to \mathcal{S}(X) \to \mathcal{N} (X) \to L_n (\pi_1 (X))$$

where:

the entries $\mathcal{N}_\partial (X \times I)$ and $\mathcal{N} (X)$ are the abelian groups of normal invariants,

the entries $\mathcal{} L_{n+1} (\pi_1 (X))$ and $\mathcal{} L_{n} (\pi_1 (X))$ are the L-groups associated to the group ring $\mathbb{Z}[\pi_1 (X)]$,

the maps $\theta \colon \mathcal{N}_\partial (X \times I) \to L_{n+1} (\pi_1 (X))$ and $\theta \colon \mathcal{N} (X) \to L_n (\pi_1 (X))$ are the surgery obstruction maps,

the arrows $\partial \colon L_{n+1} (\pi_1 (X)) \to \mathcal{S}(X)$ and $\eta \colon \mathcal{S}(X) \to \mathcal{N} (X)$ will be explained below.

== Versions ==
There are various versions of the surgery exact sequence. One can work in either of the three categories of manifolds: differentiable (smooth), PL, topological. Another possibility is to work with the decorations $s$ or $h$.

== The entries ==
=== Normal invariants ===
A degree one normal map $(f,b) \colon M \to X$ consists of the following data: an $n$-dimensional oriented closed manifold $M$, a map $f$ which is of degree one (that means $f_* ([M]) = [X]$), and a bundle map $b \colon TM \oplus \varepsilon^k \to \xi$ from the stable tangent bundle of $M$ to some bundle $\xi$ over $X$. Two such maps are equivalent if there exists a normal bordism between them (that means a bordism of the sources covered by suitable bundle data). The equivalence classes of degree one normal maps are called normal invariants.

When defined like this the normal invariants $\mathcal{N} (X)$ are just a pointed set, with the base point given by $(id,id)$. However the Pontrjagin-Thom construction gives $\mathcal{N} (X)$ a structure of an abelian group. In fact we have a non-natural bijection

$$\mathcal{N} (X) \cong [X,G/O]$$

where $G/O$ denotes the homotopy fiber of the map $J \colon BO \to BG$, which is an infinite loop space and hence maps into it define a generalized cohomology theory. There are corresponding identifications of the normal invariants with $[X,G/PL]$ when working with PL-manifolds and with $[X,G/TOP]$ when working with topological manifolds.

=== L-groups ===
The $L$-groups are defined algebraically in terms of quadratic forms or in terms of chain complexes with quadratic structure. See the main article for more details. Here only the properties of the L-groups described below will be important.

=== Surgery obstruction maps ===
The map $\theta \colon \mathcal{N} (X) \to L_n (\pi_1 (X))$ is in the first instance a set-theoretic map (that means not necessarily a homomorphism) with the following property when $n \geq 5$:

A degree one normal map $(f,b) \colon M \to X$ is normally cobordant to a homotopy equivalence if and only if the image $\theta (f,b)=0$ in $L_n (\mathbb{Z} [\pi_1 (X)])$.

=== The normal invariants arrow $\eta \colon \mathcal{S}(X) \to \mathcal{N} (X)$ ===
Any homotopy equivalence $f \colon M \to X$ defines a degree one normal map.

=== The surgery obstruction arrow $\partial \colon L_{n+1} (\pi_1 (X)) \to \mathcal{S}(X)$ ===
This arrow describes in fact an action of the group $L_{n+1} (\pi_1 (X))$ on the set $\mathcal{S}(X)$ rather than just a map. The definition is based on the realization theorem for the elements of the $L$-groups which reads as follows:

Let $M$ be an $n$-dimensional manifold with $\pi_1 (M) \cong \pi_1 (X)$ and let $x \in L_{n+1} (\pi_1 (X))$. Then there exists a degree one normal map of manifolds with boundary

$$(F,B) \colon (W,M,M') \to (M \times I, M \times 0, M \times 1)$$

with the following properties:

1. $\theta (F,B) = x \in L_{n+1} (\pi_1 (X))$
2. $F_0 \colon M \to M \times 0$ is a diffeomorphism
3. $F_1 \colon M' \to M \times 1$ is a homotopy equivalence of closed manifolds

Let $f \colon M \to X$ represent an element in $\mathcal{S} (X)$ and let $x \in L_{n+1} (\pi_1 (X))$. Then $\partial (f,x)$ is defined as $f \circ F_1 \colon M' \to X$.

== The exactness ==
Recall that the surgery structure set is only a pointed set and that the surgery obstruction map $\theta$ might not be a homomorphism. Hence it is necessary to explain what is meant when talking about the "exact sequence". So the surgery exact sequence is an exact sequence in the following sense:

For a normal invariant $z \in \mathcal{N} (X)$ we have $z \in \mathrm{Im} (\eta)$ if and only if $\theta (z) = 0$. For two manifold structures $x_1, x_2 \in \mathcal{S} (X)$ we have $\eta (x_1) = \eta(x_2)$ if and only if there exists $u \in L_{n+1} (\pi_1 (X))$ such that $\partial (u,x_1) = x_2$. For an element $u \in L_{n+1} (\pi_1 (X))$ we have $\partial (u,\mathrm{id}) = \mathrm{id}$ if and only if $u \in \mathrm{Im} (\theta)$.

== Versions revisited ==
In the topological category the surgery obstruction map can be made into a homomorphism. This is achieved by putting an alternative abelian group structure on the normal invariants as described here. Moreover, the surgery exact sequence can be identified with the algebraic surgery exact sequence of Ranicki which is an exact sequence of abelian groups by definition. This gives the structure set $\mathcal{S} (X)$ the structure of an abelian group. Note, however, that there is to this date no satisfactory geometric description of this abelian group structure.

== Classification of manifolds ==
The answer to the organizing questions of the surgery theory can be formulated in terms of the surgery exact sequence. In both cases the answer is given in the form of a two-stage obstruction theory.

The existence question. Let $X$ be a finite Poincaré complex. It is homotopy equivalent to a manifold if and only if the following two conditions are satisfied. Firstly, $X$ must have a vector bundle reduction of its Spivak normal fibration. This condition can be also formulated as saying that the set of normal invariants $\mathcal{N} (X)$ is non-empty. Secondly, there must be a normal invariant $x \in \mathcal{N} (X)$ such that $\theta (x) = 0$. Equivalently, the surgery obstruction map $\theta \colon \mathcal{N} (X) \rightarrow L_{n} (\pi_1 (X))$ hits $0 \in L_{n} (\pi_1 (X))$.

The uniqueness question. Let $f \colon M \to X$ and $f' \colon M' \to X$ represent two elements in the surgery structure set $\mathcal{S} (X)$. The question whether they represent the same element can be answered in two stages as follows. First there must be a normal cobordism between the degree one normal maps induced by $\mathcal{} f$ and $\mathcal{} f'$, this means $\mathcal{} \eta (f) = \eta (f')$ in $\mathcal{N} (X)$. Denote the normal cobordism $(F,B) \colon (W,M,M') \to (X \times I, X \times 0, X \times 1)$. If the surgery obstruction $\mathcal{} \theta (F,B)$ in $\mathcal{} L_{n+1} (\pi_1 (X))$ to make this normal cobordism to an h-cobordism (or s-cobordism) relative to the boundary vanishes then $\mathcal{} f$ and $\mathcal{} f'$ in fact represent the same element in the surgery structure set.

== Quinn's surgery fibration ==
In his thesis written under the guidance of Browder, Frank Quinn introduced a fiber sequence so that the surgery long exact sequence is the induced sequence on homotopy groups.

== Examples ==
=== 1. Homotopy spheres ===
This is an example in the smooth category, $n \geq 5$.

The idea of the surgery exact sequence is implicitly present already in the original article of Kervaire and Milnor on the groups of homotopy spheres. In the present terminology we have

$$\mathcal{S}^{DIFF} (S^n) = \Theta^n$$

$\mathcal{N}^{DIFF} (S^n) = \Omega^{alm}_n$ the cobordism group of almost framed $n$ manifolds, $\mathcal{N}^{DIFF}_\partial (S^n \times I) = \Omega^{alm}_{n+1}$

$L_n (1) =\mathbb{Z}, 0, \mathbb{Z}_2, 0$ where $n \equiv 0,1,2,3$ mod $4$ (recall the $4$-periodicity of the L-groups)

The surgery exact sequence in this case is an exact sequence of abelian groups. In addition to the above identifications we have

$$bP^{n+1} = \mathrm{ker} (\eta \colon \mathcal{S}^{DIFF} (S^n) \to \mathcal{N}^{DIFF} (S^n)) = \mathrm{coker} (\theta \colon \mathcal{N}^{DIFF}_\partial (S^n \times I) \to L_{n+1} (1))$$

Because the odd-dimensional L-groups are trivial one obtains these exact sequences:

$$0 \to \Theta^{4i} \to \Omega^{alm}_{4i} \to \mathbb{Z} \to bP^{4i} \to 0$$

$$0 \to \Theta^{4i-2} \to \Omega^{alm}_{4i-2} \to \mathbb{Z}/2 \to bP^{4i-2} \to 0$$

$$0 \to bP^{2j} \to \Theta^{2j-1} \to \Omega^{alm}_{2j-1} \to 0$$

The results of Kervaire and Milnor are obtained by studying the middle map in the first two sequences and by relating the groups $\Omega_i^{alm}$ to stable homotopy theory.

=== 2. Topological spheres ===
The generalized Poincaré conjecture in dimension $n$ can be phrased as saying that $\mathcal{S}^{TOP} (S^n) = 0$. It has been proved for any $n$ by the work of Smale, Freedman and Perelman. From the surgery exact sequence for $S^n$ for $n \geq 5$ in the topological category we see that

$$\theta \colon \mathcal{N}^{TOP} (S^n) \to L_n (1)$$

is an isomorphism. (In fact this can be extended to $n \geq 1$ by some ad-hoc methods.)

=== 3. Complex projective spaces in the topological category ===
The complex projective space $\mathbb{C} P^n$ is a $(2n)$-dimensional topological manifold with $\pi_1 (\mathbb{C} P^n)=1$. In addition it is known that in the case $\pi_1 (X) =1$ in the topological category the surgery obstruction map $\theta$ is always surjective. Hence we have

$$0 \to \mathcal{S}^{TOP} (\mathbb{C} P^n) \to \mathcal{N}^{TOP} (\mathbb{C} P^n) \to L_{2n}(1) \to 0$$

From the work of Sullivan one can calculate

$\mathcal{N} (\mathbb{C} P^n) \cong \oplus_{i=1}^{\lfloor n/2 \rfloor} \mathbb{Z} \oplus \oplus_{i=1}^{\lfloor (n+1)/2 \rfloor} \mathbb{Z}_2$ and hence $\mathcal{S} (\mathbb{C} P^n) \cong \oplus_{i=1}^{\lfloor (n-1)/2 \rfloor} \mathbb{Z} \oplus \oplus_{i=1}^{\lfloor n/2 \rfloor} \mathbb{Z}_2$

=== 4. Aspherical manifolds in the topological category ===
An aspherical $n$-dimensional manifold $X$ is an $n$-manifold such that $\pi_i (X) = 0$ for $i \geq 2$. Hence the only non-trivial homotopy group is $\pi_1 (X)$

One way to state the Borel conjecture is to say that for such $X$ we have that the Whitehead group $Wh (\pi_1 (X))$ is trivial and that

$$\mathcal{S} (X) = 0$$

This conjecture was proven in many special cases - for example when $\pi_1 (X)$ is $\mathbb{Z}^n$, when it is the fundamental group of a negatively curved manifold or when it is a word-hyperbolic group or a CAT(0)-group.

The statement is equivalent to showing that the surgery obstruction map to the right of the surgery structure set is injective and the surgery obstruction map to the left of the surgery structure set is surjective. Most of the proofs of the above-mentioned results are done by studying these maps or by studying the assembly maps with which they can be identified. See more details in Borel conjecture, Farrell-Jones Conjecture.
