= Plumbing (mathematics) =

Way to create new manifolds out of disk bundles

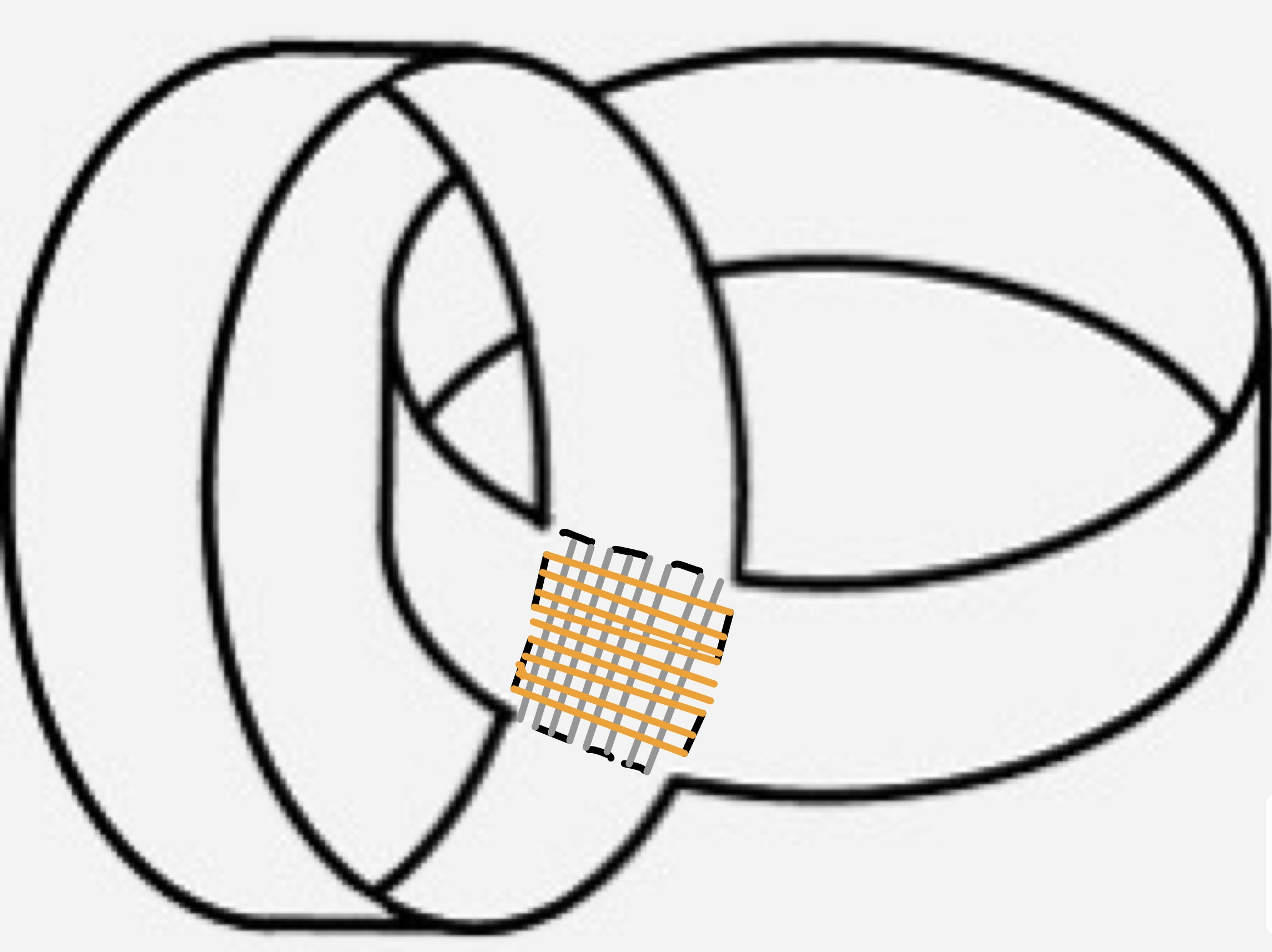
Plumbing two 1-disk bundles to get a new 2-manifold.

In the mathematical field of geometric topology, among the techniques known as surgery theory, the process of plumbing is a way to create new manifolds out of disk bundles. It was first described by John Milnor (1956) and subsequently used extensively in surgery theory to produce manifolds and normal maps with given surgery obstructions.

== Definition ==
Let $\xi_i=(E_i,M_i,p_i)$ be a rank n vector bundle over an n-dimensional smooth manifold $M_i$ for i = 1,2. Denote by $D(E_i)$ the total space of the associated (closed) disk bundle $D(\xi_i)$and suppose that $\xi_i, M_i$ and $D(E_i)$are oriented in a compatible way. If we pick two points $x_i\in M_i$, i = 1,2, and consider a ball neighbourhood of $x_i$ in $M_i$, then we get neighbourhoods $D^n_i\times D^n_i$ of the fibres over the ball in $D(E_i)$. Let $h:D^n_1\rightarrow D^n_2$ and $k:D^n_1\rightarrow D^n_2$ be two diffeomorphisms (either both orientation preserving or reversing). The plumbing (Browder, 1972) of $D(E_1)$ and $D(E_2)$ at $x_1$ and $x_2$ is defined to be the quotient space $P=D(E_1)\cup_f D(E_2)$ where $f:D^n_1\times D^n_1\rightarrow D^n_2\times D^n_2$ is defined by $f(x,y)=(k(y),h(x))$. The smooth structure on the quotient is defined by "straightening the angles" (Browder, 1972).

=== Plumbing according to a tree ===
If the base manifold is an n-sphere $S^n$, then by iterating this procedure over several vector bundles over $S^n$ one can plumb them together according to a tree (Hirzebruch et al., 1993, §8). If $T$ is a tree, we assign to each vertex a vector bundle $\xi$ over $S^n$ and we plumb the corresponding disk bundles together if two vertices are connected by an edge. One has to be careful that neighbourhoods in the total spaces do not overlap.

== Milnor manifolds ==
Let $D(\tau_{S^{2k}})$ denote the disk bundle associated to the tangent bundle of the 2k-sphere. If we plumb eight copies of $D(\tau_{S^{2k}})$ according to the diagram $E_8$, we obtain a 4k-dimensional manifold which certain authors (Madsen and Milgram, 1979; López de Medrano, 1971) call the Milnor manifold $M^{4k}_B$ (see also E_{8} manifold).

For $k>1$, the boundary $\Sigma^{4k-1}=\partial M^{4k}_B$ is a homotopy sphere which generates $\theta^{4k-1}(\partial \pi)$, the group of h-cobordism classes of homotopy spheres which bound π-manifolds (see also exotic spheres for more details). Its signature is $sgn(M^{4k}_B)=8$ and there exists (Browder, 1972, V.2.9) a normal map $(f,b)$ such that the surgery obstruction is $\sigma(f,b)=1$, where $g:(M^{4k}_B,\partial M^{4k}_B)\rightarrow (D^{4k},S^{4k-1})$ is a map of degree 1 and $b:\nu_{M^{4k}_B} \rightarrow \xi$ is a bundle map from the stable normal bundle of the Milnor manifold to a certain stable vector bundle.

== The plumbing theorem ==
A crucial theorem for the development of surgery theory is the so-called Plumbing Theorem (Browder, 1972, II.1.3) (presented here in the simply connected case):

For all $k>1, l\in \Z$, there exists a 2k-dimensional manifold $M$ with boundary $\partial M$ and a normal map $(g,c)$ where $g:(M,\partial M)\rightarrow (D^{2k},S^{2k-1})$ is such that $g|_{\partial M}$ is a homotopy equivalence, $c$ is a bundle map into the trivial bundle and the surgery obstruction is $\sigma(g,c)=l$.

The proof of this theorem makes use of the Milnor manifolds defined above.
