= Lens space =

Class of topological space

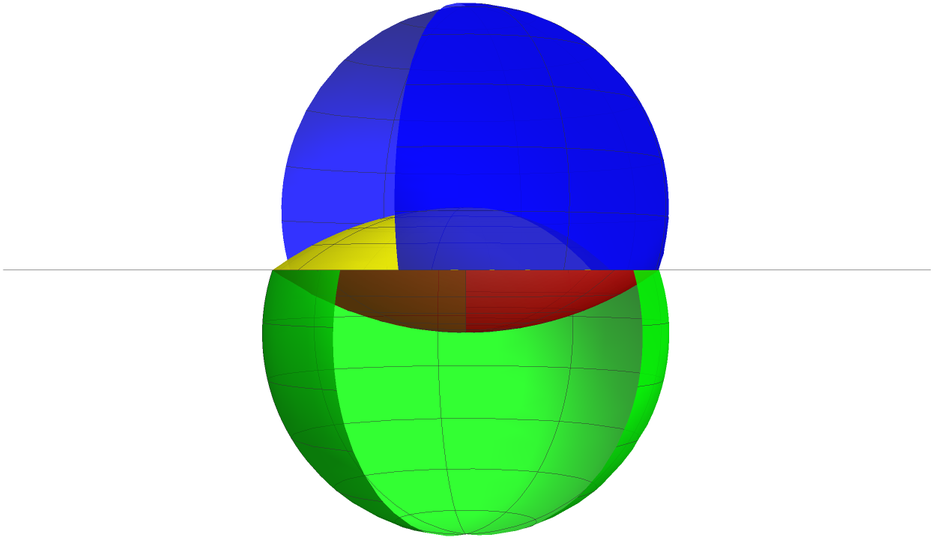
The lens space L(2;5) consists of the "lens" between the red and yellow walls using a double rotation that aligns the slits. Five "lens" regions are shown in the picture in total.

The double-rotation that identifies the walls of the lens space. In this stereographic view, the double-rotation rotates both around the z-axis and along it.

A lens space is an example of a topological space, considered in mathematics. The term often refers to a specific class of 3-manifolds, but in general can be defined for higher dimensions.

In the 3-manifold case, a lens space can be visualized as the result of gluing two solid tori together by a homeomorphism of their boundaries. Often the 3-sphere and $S^2 \times S^1$, both of which can be obtained as above, are not counted as they are considered trivial special cases.

The three-dimensional lens spaces $L(p;q)$ were introduced by Heinrich Tietze in 1908. They were the first known examples of 3-manifolds which were not determined by their homology and fundamental group alone, and the simplest examples of closed manifolds whose homeomorphism type is not determined by their homotopy type. J. W. Alexander in 1919 showed that the lens spaces $L(5;1)$ and $L(5;2)$ were not homeomorphic even though they have isomorphic fundamental groups and the same homology, though they do not have the same homotopy type. Other lens spaces (such as $L(7;1)$ and $L(7;2)$) have even the same homotopy type (and thus isomorphic fundamental groups and homology), but not the same homeomorphism type; they can thus be seen as the birth of geometric topology of manifolds as distinct from algebraic topology.

There is a complete classification of three-dimensional lens spaces, by fundamental group and Reidemeister torsion.

== Definition ==
The three-dimensional lens spaces $L(p;q)$ are quotients of $S^3$ by $\Z/p$-actions. More precisely, let $p$ and $q$ be coprime integers and consider $S^3$ as the unit sphere in $\Complex^2$. Then the $\mathbb{Z}/p$-action on $S^3$ generated by the homeomorphism

$$(z_1,z_2) \mapsto (e^{2\pi i /p} \cdot z_1, e^{2\pi i q/p}\cdot z_2)$$

is free. The resulting quotient space is called the lens space $L(p;q)$.

This can be generalized to higher dimensions as follows: Let $p,q_1,\ldots,q_n$ be integers such that the $q_i$ are coprime to $p$ and consider $S^{2n-1}$ as the unit sphere in $\mathbb C^n$. The lens space $L(p;q_1,\ldots q_n)$ is the quotient of $S^{2n-1}$ by the free $\mathbb Z/p$-action generated by

$$(z_1,\ldots,z_n) \mapsto (e^{2\pi iq_1/p} \cdot z_1,\ldots, e^{2\pi i q_n/p}\cdot z_n).$$

In three dimensions we have $L(p;q)=L(p;1,q).$

=== Properties ===
The fundamental group of all the lens spaces $L(p;q_1,\ldots, q_n)$ is $\Z/p\Z$ independent of the $q_i$.

The homology of the lens space $L(p;q_1,\ldots, q_n)$ is given by
$$H_k(L(p;q_1,\ldots, q_n)) = \begin{cases}
\Z & \text{for }k = 0, 2n-1 \\
\Z/p\Z & \text{for }k\text{ odd, }0<k<2n-1 \\
\{0\} & \text{otherwise}
\end{cases}$$

Lens spaces are locally symmetric spaces, but not (fully) symmetric, with the exception of $L(2;1)$, three-dimensional real projective space, which is symmetric. (Locally symmetric spaces are symmetric spaces that are quotiented by an isometry that has no fixed points; lens spaces meet this definition.)

== Alternative definitions of three-dimensional lens spaces ==
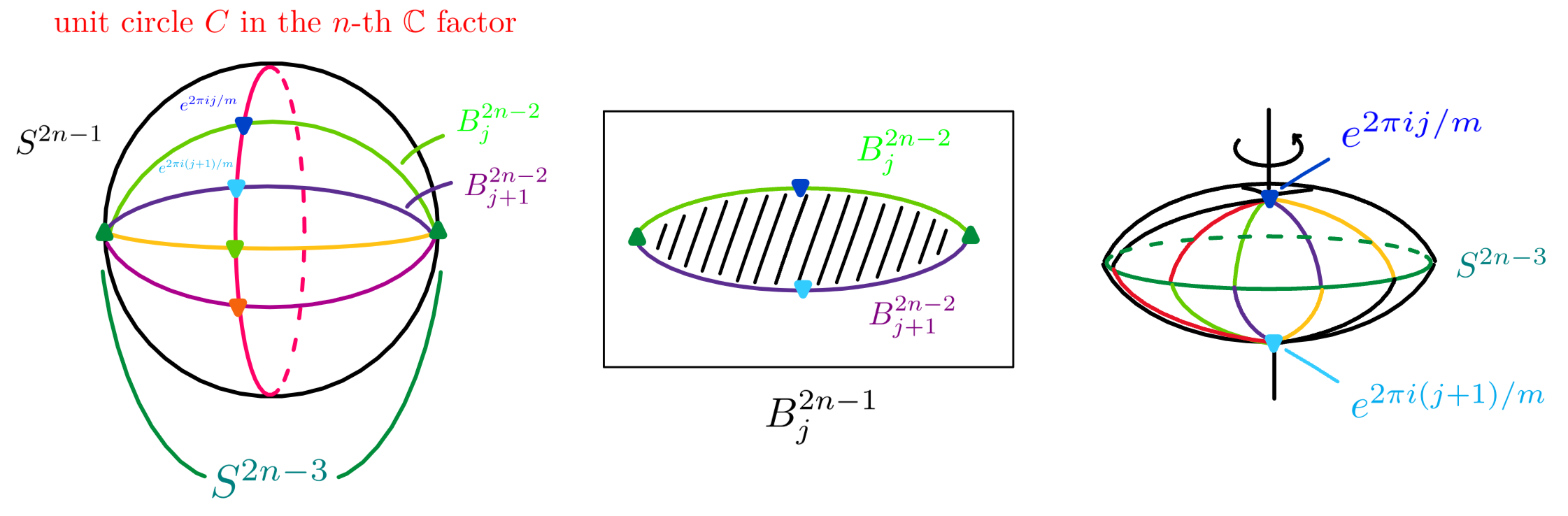
A topological lens space.

The three dimensional lens space $L(p;q)$ is often defined to be a solid ball with the following identification: first mark p equally spaced points on the equator of the solid ball, denote them $a_0$ to $a_{p-1}$, then on the boundary of the ball, draw geodesic lines connecting the points to the north and south pole. Now identify spherical triangles by identifying the north pole to the south pole and the points $a_i$ with $a_{i+q}$ and $a_{i+1}$ with $a_{i+q+1}$. The resulting space is homeomorphic to the lens space $L(p;q)$.

Another related definition is to view the solid ball as the following solid bipyramid: construct a planar regular p sided polygon. Put two points n and s directly above and below the center of the polygon. Construct the bipyramid by joining each point of the regular p sided polygon to n and s. Fill in the bipyramid to make it solid and give the triangles on the boundary the same identification as above.

== Classification of 3-dimensional lens spaces ==
Classifications up to homeomorphism and homotopy equivalence are known, as follows. The three-dimensional spaces $L(p;q_1)$ and $L(p;q_2)$ are:

1. homotopy equivalent if and only if $q_1 q_2 \equiv \pm n^2 \pmod{p}$ for some $n \in \mathbb{N}$;
2. homeomorphic if and only if $q_1 \equiv \pm q_2^{\pm 1} \pmod{p}$.

If $q_1 \equiv \pm q_2^{\pm 1} \pmod{p}$ as in case 2., they are "obviously" homeomorphic, as one can easily produce a homeomorphism. It is harder to show that these are the only homeomorphic lens spaces.

The invariant that gives the homotopy classification of 3-dimensional lens spaces is the torsion linking form.

The homeomorphism classification is more subtle, and is given by Reidemeister torsion. This was given in (Reidemeister 1935) as a classification up to PL homeomorphism, but it was shown in (Brody 1960) to be a homeomorphism classification. In modern terms, lens spaces are determined by simple homotopy type, and there are no normal invariants (like characteristic classes) or surgery obstruction.

A knot-theoretic classification is given in (Przytycki & Yasukhara 2003): let C be a closed curve in the lens space which lifts to a knot in the universal cover of the lens space. If the lifted knot has a trivial Alexander polynomial, compute the torsion linking form on the pair (C,C) – then this gives the homeomorphism classification.

Another invariant is the homotopy type of the configuration spaces – (Salvatore & Longoni 2005) showed that homotopy equivalent but not homeomorphic lens spaces may have configuration spaces with different homotopy types, which can be detected by different Massey products.

== See also ==
- Spherical 3-manifold
