= Classification of manifolds =

Basic question in geometry and topology

In mathematics, specifically geometry and topology, the classification of manifolds is a basic question, about which much is known, and many open questions about manifolds remain.

== Main themes ==
=== Overview ===
- Low-dimensional manifolds are classified by geometric structure; high-dimensional manifolds are classified algebraically, by surgery theory.

"Low dimensions" means dimensions up to 4; "high dimensions" means 5 or more dimensions. The case of dimension 4 is somehow a boundary case, as it manifests "low dimensional" behaviour smoothly (but not topologically); see discussion of "low" versus "high" dimension.

- Different categories of manifolds yield different classifications; these are related by the notion of "structure", and more general categories have neater theories.
- Positive curvature is constrained, negative curvature is generic.
- The abstract classification of high-dimensional manifolds is ineffective: given two manifolds (presented as CW complexes, for instance), there is no algorithm to determine if they are isomorphic.

=== Different categories and additional structure ===
Formally, classifying manifolds is classifying objects up to isomorphism. There are many different notions of "manifold", and corresponding notions of "map between manifolds", each of which yields a different category and a different classification question.

These categories are related by forgetful functors: for instance, a differentiable manifold is also a topological manifold, and a differentiable map is also continuous, so there is a functor $\mbox{Diff} \to \mbox{Top}$.

These functors are in general neither one-to-one nor onto on objects; these failures are generally referred to in terms of "structure", as follows. A topological manifold that is in the image of $\mbox{Diff} \to \mbox{Top}$ is said to "admit a differentiable structure", and the fiber over a given topological manifold is "the different differentiable structures on the given topological manifold".

Thus given two categories, the two natural questions are:

- Which manifolds of a given type admit an additional structure?
- If it admits an additional structure, how many does it admit?

More precisely, what is the structure of the set of additional structures?

In more general categories, this structure set has more structure: in Diff it is simply a set, but in Top it is a group, and functorially so.

Many of these structures are G-structures, and the question is reduction of the structure group. The most familiar example is orientability: some manifolds are orientable, some are not, and orientable manifolds admit 2 orientations.

=== Enumeration versus invariants ===
There are two usual ways to give a classification: explicitly, by an enumeration, or implicitly, in terms of invariants.

For instance, for orientable surfaces, the classification of surfaces enumerates them as the connected sum of $n \geq 0$ tori, and an invariant that classifies them is the genus or Euler characteristic.

Manifolds have a rich set of invariants, including:

- Point-set topology
  - Compactness
  - Connectedness
- Classic algebraic topology
  - Euler characteristic
  - Fundamental group
  - Cohomology ring
- Geometric topology
  - normal invariants (orientability, characteristic classes, and characteristic numbers)
  - Simple homotopy (Reidemeister torsion)
  - Surgery theory

Modern algebraic topology (beyond cobordism theory), such as Extraordinary (co)homology, is little-used in the classification of manifolds, because these invariants are homotopy-invariant, and hence don't help with the finer classifications above homotopy type.

Cobordism groups (the bordism groups of a point) are computed, but the bordism groups of a space (such as $MO_*(M)$) are generally not.

==== Point-set ====
The point-set classification is basic—one generally fixes point-set assumptions and then studies that class of manifold. The most frequently classified class of manifolds is closed, connected manifolds.

Being homogeneous (away from any boundary), manifolds have no local point-set invariants, other than their dimension and boundary versus interior, and the most used global point-set properties are compactness and connectedness. Conventional names for combinations of these are:

- A compact manifold is a compact manifold, possibly with boundary, and not necessarily connected (but necessarily with finitely many components).
- A closed manifold is a compact manifold without boundary, not necessarily connected.
- An open manifold is a manifold without boundary (not necessarily connected), with no compact component.

For instance, $[0,1]$ is a compact manifold, $S^1$ is a closed manifold, and $(0,1)$ is an open manifold, while $[0,1)$ is none of these.

==== Computability ====
The Euler characteristic is a homological invariant, and thus can be effectively computed given a CW structure, so 2-manifolds are classified homologically.

Characteristic classes and characteristic numbers are the corresponding generalized homological invariants, but they do not classify manifolds in higher dimension (they are not a complete set of invariants): for instance, orientable 3-manifolds are parallelizable (Steenrod's theorem in low-dimensional topology), so all characteristic classes vanish. In higher dimensions, characteristic classes do not in general vanish, and provide useful but not complete data.

Manifolds in dimension 4 and above cannot be effectively classified: given two n-manifolds ($n \geq 4$) presented as CW complexes or handlebodies, there is no algorithm for determining if they are isomorphic (homeomorphic, diffeomorphic). This is due to the unsolvability of the word problem for groups, or more precisely, the triviality problem (given a finite presentation for a group, is it the trivial group?). Any finite presentation of a group can be realized as a 2-complex, and can be realized as the 2-skeleton of a 4-manifold (or higher). Thus one cannot even compute the fundamental group of a given high-dimensional manifold, much less a classification.

This ineffectiveness is a fundamental reason why surgery theory does not classify manifolds up to homeomorphism. Instead, for any fixed manifold M it classifies pairs $(N,f)$ with N a manifold and $f\colon N\to M$ a homotopy equivalence, two such pairs, $(N,f)$ and $(N',f')$, being regarded as equivalent if there exist a homeomorphism $h\colon N\to N'$ and a homotopy $f'h \sim f\colon N\to M$.

=== Positive curvature is constrained, negative curvature is generic ===
Many classical theorems in Riemannian geometry show that manifolds with positive curvature are constrained, most dramatically the 1/4-pinched sphere theorem. Conversely, negative curvature is generic: for instance, any manifold of dimension $n\geq 3$ admits a metric with negative Ricci curvature.

This phenomenon is evident already for surfaces: there is a single orientable (and a single non-orientable) closed surface with positive curvature (the sphere and projective plane), and likewise for zero curvature (the torus and the Klein bottle), and all surfaces of higher genus admit negative curvature metrics only.

Similarly for 3-manifolds: of the 8 geometries, all but hyperbolic are quite constrained.

== Overview by dimension ==
- Dimension 0 is trivial and 1 is straightforward.
- Low dimension manifolds (dimensions 2 and 3) admit geometry.
- Middle dimension manifolds (dimension 4 differentiably) exhibit exotic phenomena.
- High dimension manifolds (dimension 5 and more differentiably, dimension 4 and more topologically) are classified by surgery theory.

Thus dimension 4 differentiable manifolds are the most complicated: they are neither geometrizable (as in lower dimension), nor are they classified by surgery (as in higher dimension or topologically), and they exhibit unusual phenomena, most strikingly the uncountably infinitely many exotic differentiable structures on R^{4}. Notably, differentiable 4-manifolds is the only remaining open case of the generalized Poincaré conjecture.

One can take a low-dimensional point of view on high-dimensional manifolds and ask "Which high-dimensional manifolds are geometrizable?", for various notions of geometrizable (cut into geometrizable pieces as in 3 dimensions, into symplectic manifolds, and so forth). In dimension 4 and above not all manifolds are geometrizable, but they are an interesting class.

Conversely, one can take a high-dimensional point of view on low-dimensional manifolds and ask "What does surgery predict for low-dimensional manifolds?", meaning "If surgery worked in low dimensions, what would low-dimensional manifolds look like?" One can then compare the actual theory of low-dimensional manifolds to the low-dimensional analog of high-dimensional manifolds, and see if low-dimensional manifolds behave "as you would expect": in what ways do they behave like high-dimensional manifolds (but for different reasons, or via different proofs) and in what ways are they unusual?

== Dimensions 0 and 1 ==
There is a unique connected 0-dimensional manifold, namely the point, and disconnected 0-dimensional manifolds are just discrete sets, classified by cardinality. They have no geometry, and their study is combinatorics.

A connected compact 1-dimensional manifold without boundary is homeomorphic (or diffeomorphic if it is smooth) to the circle. A second countable, non-compact 1-dimensional manifold is homeomorphic or diffeomorphic to the real line. Dropping the assumption of second countability one gets two additional manifolds: the long line, and a space formed from a ray of the real line and a ray of the long line meeting at a point.

The study of maps of 1-dimensional manifolds are a non-trivial area. For example:

- Groups of diffeomorphisms of 1-manifolds are quite difficult to understand finely
- Maps from the circle into the 3-sphere (or more generally any 3-dimensional manifold) are studied as part of knot theory.

== Dimensions 2 and 3: geometrizable ==
Every connected closed 2-dimensional manifold (surface) admits a constant curvature metric, by the uniformization theorem. There are 3 such curvatures (positive, zero, and negative). This is a classical result, and as stated, easy (the full uniformization theorem is subtler). The study of surfaces is deeply connected with complex analysis and algebraic geometry, as every orientable surface can be considered a Riemann surface or complex algebraic curve. While the classification of surfaces is classical, maps of surfaces is an active area; see below.

Every closed 3-dimensional manifold can be cut into pieces that are geometrizable, by the geometrization conjecture, and there are 8 such geometries. This is a recent result, and quite difficult. The proof (the Solution of the Poincaré conjecture) is analytic, not topological.

== Dimension 4: exotic ==
Four-dimensional manifolds are the most unusual: they are not geometrizable (as in lower dimensions), and surgery works topologically, but not differentiably.

Since topologically, 4-manifolds are classified by surgery, the differentiable classification question is phrased in terms of "differentiable structures": "which (topological) 4-manifolds admit a differentiable structure, and on those that do, how many differentiable structures are there?"

Four-manifolds often admit many unusual differentiable structures, most strikingly the uncountably infinitely many exotic differentiable structures on R^{4}. Similarly, differentiable 4-manifolds is the only remaining open case of the generalized Poincaré conjecture.

== Dimension 5 and more: surgery ==
In dimension 5 and above (and 4 dimensions topologically), manifolds are classified by surgery theory.

The Whitney trick requires 2+1 dimensions (2 space, 1 time), hence the two Whitney disks of surgery theory require 2+2+1=5 dimensions.

The reason for dimension 5 is that the Whitney trick works in the middle dimension in dimension 5 and more: two Whitney disks generically don't intersect in dimension 5 and above, by general position ($2+2 < 5$). In dimension 4, one can resolve intersections of two Whitney disks via Casson handles, which works topologically but not differentiably; see Geometric topology: Dimension for details on dimension.

More subtly, dimension 5 is the cut-off because the middle dimension has codimension more than 2: when the codimension is 2, one encounters knot theory, but when the codimension is more than 2, embedding theory is tractable, via the calculus of functors. This is discussed further below.

== Maps between manifolds ==
From the point of view of category theory, the classification of manifolds is one piece of understanding the category: it's classifying the objects. The other question is classifying maps of manifolds up to various equivalences, and there are many results and open questions in this area.

For maps, the appropriate notion of "low dimension" is for some purposes "self maps of low-dimensional manifolds", and for other purposes "low codimension".

=== Low-dimensional self-maps ===
- 1-dimensional: homeomorphisms of the circle
- 2-dimensional: mapping class group and Torelli group

=== Low codimension ===
Analogously to the classification of manifolds, in high codimension (meaning more than 2), embeddings are classified by surgery, while in low codimension or in relative dimension, they are rigid and geometric, and in the middle (codimension 2), one has a difficult exotic theory (knot theory).

- In codimension greater than 2, embeddings are classified by surgery theory.
- In codimension 2, particularly embeddings of 1-dimensional manifolds in 3-dimensional ones, one has knot theory.
- In codimension 1, a codimension 1 embedding separates a manifold, and these are tractable.
- In codimension 0, a codimension 0 (proper) immersion is a covering space, which are classified algebraically, and these are more naturally thought of as submersions.
- In relative dimension, a submersion with compact domain is a fiber bundle (just as in codimension 0 = relative dimension 0), which are classified algebraically.

=== High dimensions ===
Particularly topologically interesting classes of maps include embeddings, immersions, and submersions.

Geometrically interesting are isometries and isometric immersions.

Fundamental results in embeddings and immersions include:

- Whitney embedding theorem
- Whitney immersion theorem
- Nash embedding theorem
- Smale-Hirsch theorem

Key tools in studying these maps are:

- Gromov's h-principles
- Calculus of functors

One may classify maps up to various equivalences:

- homotopy
- cobordism
- concordance
- isotopy

Diffeomorphisms up to cobordism have been classified by Matthias Kreck

== See also ==
- The Berger classification of holonomy groups.
