= Assembly map =

Concept in geometric topology

In mathematics, assembly maps are an important concept in geometric topology. From the homotopy-theoretical viewpoint, an assembly map is a universal approximation of a homotopy invariant functor by a homology theory from the left. From the geometric viewpoint, assembly maps correspond to 'assemble' local data over a parameter space together to get global data.

Assembly maps for algebraic K-theory and L-theory play a central role in the topology of high-dimensional manifolds, since their homotopy fibers have a direct geometric interpretation.

== Homotopy-theoretical viewpoint ==
It is a classical result that for any generalized homology theory $h_*$ on the category of topological spaces (assumed to be homotopy equivalent to CW-complexes), there is a spectrum $E$ such that

$$h_*(X)\cong \pi_*(X_+\wedge E),$$

where $X_+:=X\sqcup \{*\}$.

The functor $X\mapsto X_+ \wedge E$ from spaces to spectra has the following properties:

- It is homotopy-invariant (preserves homotopy equivalences). This reflects the fact that $h_*$ is homotopy-invariant.
- It preserves homotopy co-cartesian squares. This reflects the fact that $h_*$ has Mayer-Vietoris sequences, an equivalent characterization of excision.
- It preserves arbitrary coproducts. This reflects the disjoint-union axiom of $h_*$.

A functor from spaces to spectra fulfilling these properties is called excisive.

Now suppose that $F$ is a homotopy-invariant, not necessarily excisive functor. An assembly map is a natural transformation $\alpha\colon F^\%\to F$ from some excisive functor $F^\%$ to $F$ such that $F^\%(*)\to F(*)$ is a homotopy equivalence.

If we denote by $h_*:=\pi_*\circ F^\%$ the associated homology theory, it follows that the induced natural transformation of graded abelian groups $h_*\to \pi_*\circ F$ is the universal transformation from a homology theory to $\pi_*\circ F$, i.e. any other transformation $k_*\to\pi_*\circ F$ from some homology theory $k_*$ factors uniquely through a transformation of homology theories $k_*\to h_*$.

Assembly maps exist for any homotopy invariant functor, by a simple homotopy-theoretical construction.

== Geometric viewpoint ==
As a consequence of the Mayer-Vietoris sequence, the value of an excisive functor on a space $X$ only depends on its value on 'small' subspaces of $X$, together with the knowledge how these small subspaces intersect. In a cycle representation of the associated homology theory, this means that all cycles must be representable by small cycles. For instance, for singular homology, the excision property is proved by subdivision of simplices, obtaining sums of small simplices representing arbitrary homology classes.

In this spirit, for certain homotopy-invariant functors which are not excisive, the corresponding excisive theory may be constructed by imposing 'control conditions', leading to the field of controlled topology. In this picture, assembly maps are 'forget-control' maps, i.e. they are induced by forgetting the control conditions.

== Importance in geometric topology ==
Assembly maps are studied in geometric topology mainly for the two functors $L(X)$, algebraic L-theory of $X$, and $A(X)$, algebraic K-theory of spaces of $X$. In fact, the homotopy fibers of both assembly maps have a direct geometric interpretation when $X$ is a compact topological manifold. Therefore, knowledge about the geometry of compact topological manifolds may be obtained by studying $K$- and $L$-theory and their respective assembly maps.

In the case of $L$-theory, the homotopy fiber $L_\%(M)$ of the corresponding assembly map $L^\%(M)\to L(M)$, evaluated at a compact topological manifold $M$, is homotopy equivalent to the space of block structures of $M$. Moreover, the fibration sequence

$$L_\%(M)\to L^\%(M)\to L(M)$$

induces a long exact sequence of homotopy groups which may be identified with the surgery exact sequence of $M$. This may be called the fundamental theorem of surgery theory and was developed subsequently by William Browder, Sergei Novikov, Dennis Sullivan, C. T. C. Wall, Frank Quinn, and Andrew Ranicki.

For $A$-theory, the homotopy fiber $A_\%(M)$ of the corresponding assembly map is homotopy equivalent to the space of stable h-cobordisms on $M$. This fact is called the stable parametrized h-cobordism theorem, proven by Waldhausen-Jahren-Rognes. It may be viewed as a parametrized version of the classical theorem which states that equivalence classes of h-cobordisms on $M$ are in 1-to-1 correspondence with elements in the Whitehead group of $\pi_1(M)$.
