= Simple homotopy theory =

In mathematics, simple homotopy theory is a homotopy theory (a branch of algebraic topology) that concerns with the simple-homotopy type of a space. It was originated by J. H. C. Whitehead in his 1950 paper "Simple homotopy types".

== See also ==
- Whitehead torsion
