= Wall's finiteness obstruction =

In geometric topology, a field within mathematics, the obstruction to a finitely dominated space X being homotopy-equivalent to a finite CW-complex is its Wall finiteness obstruction w(X) which is an element in the reduced zeroth algebraic K-theory $\widetilde{K}_0(\mathbb{Z}[\pi_1(X)])$ of the integral group ring $\mathbb{Z}[\pi_1(X)]$. It is named after the mathematician C. T. C. Wall.

By work of John Milnor on finitely dominated spaces, no generality is lost in letting X be a CW-complex. A finite domination of X is a finite CW-complex K together with maps $r:K\to X$ and $i\colon X\to K$ such that $r\circ i\simeq 1_X$. By a construction due to Milnor it is possible to extend r to a homotopy equivalence $\bar{r}\colon \bar{K}\to X$ where $\bar{K}$ is a CW-complex obtained from K by attaching cells to kill the relative homotopy groups $\pi_n(r)$.

The space $\bar{K}$ will be finite if all relative homotopy groups are finitely generated. Wall showed that this will be the case if and only if his finiteness obstruction vanishes. More precisely, using covering space theory and the Hurewicz theorem one can identify $\pi_n(r)$ with $H_n(\widetilde{X},\widetilde{K})$. Wall then showed that the cellular chain complex $C_*(\widetilde{X})$ is chain-homotopy equivalent to a chain complex $A_*$ of finite type of projective $\mathbb{Z}[\pi_1(X)]$-modules, and that $H_n(\widetilde{X},\widetilde{K})\cong H_n(A_*)$ will be finitely generated if and only if these modules are stably-free. Stably-free modules vanish in reduced K-theory. This motivates the definition

$$w(X)=\sum_i(-1)^i[A_i]\in\widetilde{K}_0(\mathbb{Z}[\pi_1(X)])$$.

== See also ==
- Algebraic K-theory
- Whitehead torsion
