= Normal map =

Normal map may refer to:

- Normal mapping in 3D computer graphics
- Normal invariants in mathematical surgery theory
- Normal matrix in linear algebra
- Normal operator in functional analysis
