= Poincaré space =

In algebraic topology, a Poincaré space is an n-dimensional topological space with a distinguished element μ of its nth homology group such that taking the cap product with an element of the kth cohomology group yields an isomorphism to the (n − k)th homology group. The space is essentially one for which Poincaré duality is valid; more precisely, one whose singular chain complex forms a Poincaré complex with respect to the distinguished element μ.

For example, any closed, orientable, connected manifold M is a Poincaré space, where the distinguished element is the fundamental class $[M].$

Poincaré spaces are used in surgery theory to analyze and classify manifolds. Not every Poincaré space is a manifold, but the difference can be studied, first by having a normal map from a manifold, and then via obstruction theory.

== Other uses ==
Sometimes, Poincaré space means a homology sphere with non-trivial fundamental group—for instance, the Poincaré dodecahedral space in 3 dimensions.

== See also ==
- Stable normal bundle
