= Whitehead group =

Whitehead group in mathematics may mean:

- A group W with Ext(W, Z)=0; see Whitehead problem
- For a ring, the Whitehead group Wh(A) of a ring A, equal to $K_1(A)$
- For a group, the Whitehead group Wh(G) of a group G, equal to K_{1}(Z[G])/{±G}. Note that this is a quotient of the Whitehead group of the group ring.
- The Whitehead group Wh(A) of a simplicial complex or PL-manifold A, equal to Wh(π_{1}(A)); see Whitehead torsion.

All named after J. H. C. Whitehead.
