= Stable normal bundle =

Concept in mathematics

In surgery theory, a branch of mathematics, the stable normal bundle of a differentiable manifold is an invariant which encodes the stable normal (dually, tangential) data. There are analogs for generalizations of manifold, notably PL-manifolds and topological manifolds. There is also an analogue in homotopy theory for Poincaré spaces, the Spivak spherical fibration, named after Michael Spivak.

== Construction via embeddings ==
Given an embedding of a manifold in Euclidean space (provided by the theorem of Hassler Whitney), it has a normal bundle. The embedding is not unique, but for high dimension of the Euclidean space it is unique up to isotopy, thus the (class of the) bundle is unique, and called the stable normal bundle.

This construction works for any Poincaré space X: a finite CW-complex admits a stably unique (up to homotopy) embedding in Euclidean space, via general position, and this embedding yields a spherical fibration over X. For more restricted spaces (notably PL-manifolds and topological manifolds), one gets stronger data.

=== Details ===
Two embeddings $i,i'\colon X \hookrightarrow \R^m$ are isotopic if they are homotopic through embeddings. Given a manifold or other suitable space X, with two embeddings into Euclidean space $i\colon X \hookrightarrow \R^m,$ $j\colon X \hookrightarrow \R^n,$ these will not in general be isotopic, or even maps into the same space ($m$ need not equal $n$). However, one can embed these into a larger space $\mathbf{R}^N$ by letting the last $N-m$ coordinates be 0:

$$i\colon X \hookrightarrow \R^m \cong \R^m \times \left\{(0,\dots,0)\right\} \subset \R^m \times \R^{N-m} \cong \R^N$$.

This process of adjoining trivial copies of Euclidean space is called stabilization. One can thus arrange for any two embeddings into Euclidean space to map into the same Euclidean space (taking $N = \max(m,n)$), and, further, if $N$ is sufficiently large, these embeddings are isotopic, which is a theorem.

Thus there is a unique stable isotopy class of embedding: it is not a particular embedding (as there are many embeddings), nor an isotopy class (as the target space is not fixed: it is just "a sufficiently large Euclidean space"), but rather a stable isotopy class of maps. The normal bundle associated with this (stable class of) embeddings is then the stable normal bundle.

One can replace this stable isotopy class with an actual isotopy class by fixing the target space, either by using Hilbert space as the target space, or (for a fixed dimension of manifold $n$) using a fixed $N$ sufficiently large, as N depends only on n, not the manifold in question.

More abstractly, rather than stabilizing the embedding, one can take any embedding, and then take a vector bundle direct sum with a sufficient number of trivial line bundles; this corresponds exactly to the normal bundle of the stabilized embedding.

== Construction via classifying spaces ==
An n-manifold M has a tangent bundle, which has a classifying map (up to homotopy)

$$\tau_M\colon M \to B\textrm{O}(n).$$

Composing with the inclusion $B\textrm{O}(n) \to B\textrm{O}$ yields (the homotopy class of a classifying map of) the stable tangent bundle. The normal bundle of an embedding $M \subset \R^{n+k}$ ($k$ large) is an inverse $\nu_M\colon M \to B\textrm{O}(k)$ for $\tau_M$, such that the Whitney sum $\tau_M\oplus \nu_M \colon M \to B\textrm{O}(n+k)$ is trivial. The homotopy class of the composite $\nu_M\colon M \to B\textrm{O}(k) \to B\textrm{O}$ is independent of the choice of embedding, classifying the stable normal bundle $\nu_M$.

== Motivation ==
There is no intrinsic notion of a normal vector to a manifold, unlike tangent or cotangent vectors – for instance, the normal space depends on which dimension one is embedding into – so the stable normal bundle instead provides a notion of a stable normal space: a normal space (and normal vectors) up to trivial summands.

Why stable normal, instead of stable tangent? Stable normal data is used instead of unstable tangential data because generalizations of manifolds have natural stable normal-type structures, coming from tubular neighborhoods and generalizations, but not unstable tangential ones, as the local structure is not smooth.

Spherical fibrations over a space X are classified by the homotopy classes of maps $X \to BG$ to a classifying space $BG$, with homotopy groups the stable homotopy groups of spheres

$$\pi_*(BG)=\pi_{*-1}^S$$.

The forgetful map $B\textrm{O} \to BG$ extends to a fibration sequence

$$B\textrm{O} \to BG \to B(G/\textrm{O})$$.

A Poincaré space X does not have a tangent bundle, but it does have a well-defined stable spherical fibration, which for a differentiable manifold is the spherical fibration associated to the stable normal bundle; thus a primary obstruction to X having the homotopy type of a differentiable manifold is that the spherical fibration lifts to a vector bundle, i.e., the Spivak spherical fibration $X \to BG$ must lift to $X \to B\textrm{O}$, which is equivalent to the map $X \to B(G/\textrm{O})$ being null homotopic Thus the bundle obstruction to the existence of a (smooth) manifold structure is the class $X \to B(G/\textrm{O})$. The secondary obstruction is the Wall surgery obstruction.

== Applications ==
The stable normal bundle is fundamental in surgery theory as a primary obstruction:

- For a Poincaré space X to have the homotopy type of a smooth manifold, the map $X \to B(G/\textrm{O})$ must be null homotopic
- For a homotopy equivalence $f\colon M \to N$ between two manifolds to be homotopic to a diffeomorphism, it must pull back the stable normal bundle on N to the stable normal bundle on M.

More generally, its generalizations serve as replacements for the (unstable) tangent bundle.
