= Werner Müller (mathematician) =

German mathematician (born 1949)

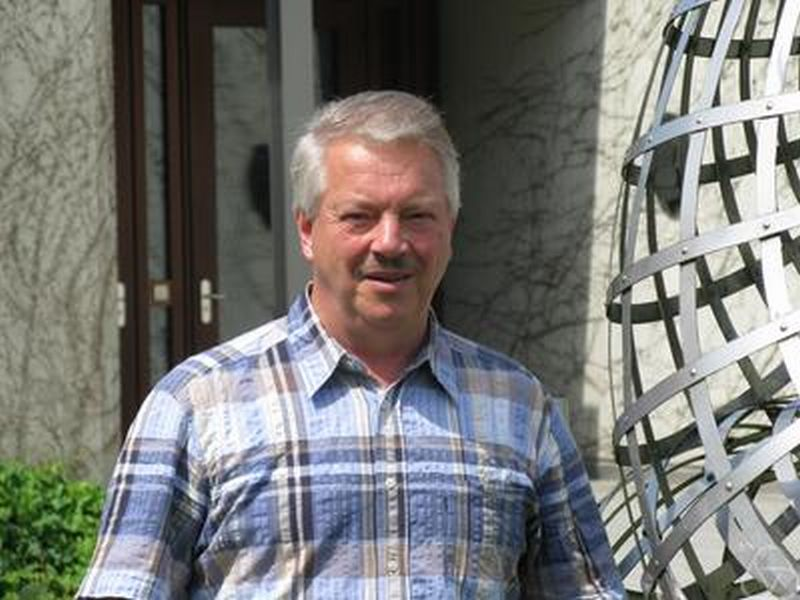
Müller at Oberwolfach, 2010

Werner Müller (born 7 September 1949) is a German mathematician. His research focuses on global analysis and automorphic forms.

== Biography ==
Werner Müller grew up in the German Democratic Republic (East Germany). He studied mathematics at the Humboldt University of Berlin in East Berlin. In 1977 he completed his PhD under the supervision of Herbert Kurke. In his thesis, Analytische Torsion Riemannscher Mannigfaltigkeiten, he solved, at the same time as but independently of Jeff Cheeger, the Ray–Singer conjecture on the equality between analytic torsion and Reidemeister torsion. Thereafter he moved to the Karl-Weierstraß-Institut für Mathematik of the Academy of Sciences of the GDR. After the reunion of Germany he spent some time at the Max Planck Institute for Mathematics in Bonn. Since 1994 he is professor at the Mathematics Institute of the University of Bonn. He is the successor on the chair of Friedrich Hirzebruch. He has supervised 12 doctoral students, including Maryna Viazovska.

Together with Jeff Cheeger, he has been awarded the Max-Planck-Forschungspreis in 1991 . The Cheeger–Müller theorem on the analytic torsion of Riemannian manifolds is named after them.

== Important Papers ==
- Müller, Werner (1978). "Analytic torsion and $R$-torsion of Riemannian manifolds". Advances in Mathematics. 28 (3): 233–305. doi:10.1016/0001-8708(78)90116-0.
- Muller, Werner (1989). "The trace class conjecture in the theory of automorphic forms". Annals of Mathematics. Second Series. 130 (3): 473–529. doi:10.2307/1971453. JSTOR 1971453.
