= Maryna Viazovska =

Ukrainian mathematician (born 1984)

- Марина Вязовська
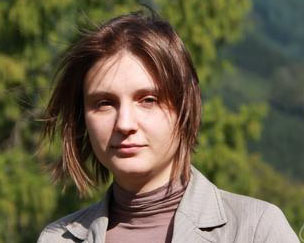
- Viazovska in 2013 at Oberwolfach
- Born: Maryna Sergiivna Viazovska; 2 December 1984 (age 41); Kyiv, Ukrainian SSR, Soviet Union
- Citizenship: Ukrainian
- Education: Taras Shevchenko National University of Kyiv; University of Kaiserslautern; University of Bonn
- Known for: Sphere-packing problem
- Spouse: Daniil Evtushinsky
- Children: 2
- Awards: Salem Prize (2016); Clay Research Award (2017); SASTRA Ramanujan Prize (2017); European Prize in Combinatorics (2017); New Horizons in Mathematics Prize (2018); Ruth Lyttle Satter Prize in Mathematics (2019); Fermat Prize (2019); EMS Prize (2020); Fields Medal (2022)
- Scientific career
- Fields: Mathematics
- Workplaces: Berlin Mathematical School; Humboldt University of Berlin; École Polytechnique Fédérale de Lausanne
- Thesis: Modular Functions and Special Cycles (2013)
- Doctoral advisors: Don Zagier; Werner Müller
- Website: tn.epfl.ch

Maryna Sergiivna Viazovska (Ukrainian: Марина Сергіївна Вязовська, pronounced [mɐˈrɪnɐ wʲɐˈzɔu̯sʲkɐ]; born 2 December 1984) is a Ukrainian mathematician known for her work in sphere packing. She is a full professor and Chair of Number Theory at the Institute of Mathematics of the École Polytechnique Fédérale de Lausanne in Switzerland. She was awarded the Fields Medal in 2022.

== Education and career ==
Viazovska was born in Kyiv, the oldest of three sisters. Her father was a chemist who worked at the Antonov aircraft factory, and her mother was an engineer. She attended a specialized secondary school for high-achieving students in science and technology, Kyiv Natural Science Lyceum No. 145. An influential teacher there, Andrii Knyazyuk, had previously worked as a professional research mathematician before becoming a secondary school teacher. Viazovska competed in domestic mathematics Olympiads when she was at high school, placing 13th in a national competition where 12 students were selected to a training camp before a six-member team for the International Mathematical Olympiad was chosen. As a student at Taras Shevchenko National University of Kyiv, she competed at the International Mathematics Competition for University Students in 2002, 2003, 2004, and 2005, and was one of the first-place winners in 2002 and 2005. She co-authored her first research paper in 2005.

Viazovska earned a master's from the University of Kaiserslautern in 2007, PhD from the Institute of Mathematics of the National Academy of Sciences of Ukraine in 2010, and a doctorate (Dr. rer. nat.) from the University of Bonn in 2013. Her doctoral dissertation, Modular Functions and Special Cycles, concerns analytic number theory and was supervised by Don Zagier and Werner Müller.

She was a postdoctoral researcher at the Berlin Mathematical School and the Humboldt University of Berlin and a Minerva Distinguished Visitor at Princeton University. Since January 2018 she has held the Chair of Number Theory as a full professor at the École Polytechnique Fédérale de Lausanne (EPFL) in Switzerland after a short stint as tenure-track assistant professor.

== Contributions ==
In 2016, Viazovska solved the sphere-packing problem in dimension 8. Her dimension 8 solution quickly led to collaboration with others, and a solution in dimension 24. Previously, the problem had been solved only for three or fewer dimensions, and the proof of the three-dimensional version (the Kepler conjecture) involved long computer calculations. In contrast, Viazovska's proof for 8 and 24 dimensions has been described as "stunningly simple".

A few years later, in 2018, Viazovska and her collaborators significantly extended their sphere packing results in dimensions 8 and 24 to address potential energy minimization. In 2019, Viazovska and her team solved a mathematical equation that determines how an infinite number of points repelling each other are placed in 8- and 24-dimensional spaces.

As well as for her work on sphere packing, Viazovska is also known for her research on spherical designs with Bondarenko and Radchenko. With them she proved a conjecture of Korevaar and Meyers on the existence of small designs in arbitrary dimensions. This result was one of the contributions for which her co-author Andriy Bondarenko won the Vasil A. Popov Prize for approximation theory in 2013.

== Recognition ==
In 2016, Viazovska received the Salem Prize and, in 2017, the Clay Research Award and the SASTRA Ramanujan Prize for her work on sphere packing and modular forms. In December 2017, she was awarded a 2018 New Horizons Prize in Mathematics. She was an invited speaker at the 2018 International Congress of Mathematicians. For 2019 she was awarded the Ruth Lyttle Satter Prize in Mathematics and the Fermat Prize. She is one of the 2020 winners of the EMS Prize. In 2020, she also received the National Latsis Prize awarded by the Latsis Foundation. She was elected to the Academia Europaea in 2021. She was appointed Senior Scholar at the Clay Mathematics Institute in July 2022.

She was awarded the Fields Medal in July 2022, making her the second woman (after Maryam Mirzakhani), the second person born in the Ukrainian SSR (after Vladimir Drinfeld) and the first with a degree from a Ukrainian university to ever receive it. She was honored as one of the BBC 100 Women in December 2022.

== Personal life ==
Viazovska met her husband, Daniil Evtushinsky, at an after-school physics group for schoolchildren. He is also a researcher at EPFL, in physics. They have two children, a son and a daughter.

== Selected publications ==
- Bondarenko, Andriy; Radchenko, Danylo; Viazovska, Maryna (2013), "Optimal asymptotic bounds for spherical designs", Annals of Mathematics, Second Series, 178 (2): 443–452, arXiv:1009.4407, doi:10.4007/annals.2013.178.2.2, MR 3071504, S2CID 2490453
- Viazovska, Maryna (2017), "The sphere packing problem in dimension 8", Annals of Mathematics, 185 (3): 991–1015, arXiv:1603.04246, doi:10.4007/annals.2017.185.3.7, S2CID 119286185
- Cohn, Henry; Kumar, Abhinav; Miller, Stephen D.; Radchenko, Danylo; Viazovska, Maryna (2017), "The sphere packing problem in dimension 24", Annals of Mathematics, 185 (3): 1017–1033, arXiv:1603.06518, doi:10.4007/annals.2017.185.3.8, S2CID 119281758
- Cohn, Henry; Kumar, Abhinav; Miller, Stephen D.; Radchenko, Danylo; Viazovska, Maryna (2022), "Universal optimality of the E_{8} and Leech lattices and interpolation formulas", Annals of Mathematics, 196 (3): 983–1082, arXiv:1902.05438, doi:10.4007/annals.2022.196.3.3, S2CID 119741285
