= Poincaré complex =

In mathematics, and especially topology, a Poincaré complex (named after the mathematician Henri Poincaré) is an abstraction of the singular chain complex of a closed, orientable manifold.

The singular homology and cohomology groups of a closed, orientable manifold are related by Poincaré duality, an isomorphism between its homology and cohomology groups. A chain complex is called a Poincaré complex if its homology and cohomology groups have the abstract properties of Poincaré duality.

A Poincaré space is a topological space whose singular chain complex is a Poincaré complex. These are used in surgery theory to analyze manifolds algebraically.

== Definition ==
Let $C = \{C_i\}$ be a chain complex of abelian groups, and assume that the homology groups of $C$ are finitely generated. Assume that there exists a map $\Delta\colon C\to C\otimes C$, called a chain-diagonal, with the property that $(\varepsilon \otimes 1)\Delta = (1\otimes \varepsilon)\Delta$. Here the map $\varepsilon\colon C_0\to \mathbb{Z}$ denotes the ring homomorphism known as the augmentation map, which is defined as follows: if $n_1\sigma_1 + \cdots + n_k\sigma_k\in C_0$, then $\varepsilon(n_1\sigma_1 + \cdots + n_k\sigma_k) = n_1+ \cdots + n_k\in \mathbb{Z}$.

Using the diagonal as defined above, we are able to form pairings, namely:

$$\rho \colon H^k(C)\otimes H_n(C) \to H_{n-k}(C), \ \text{where} \ \ \rho(x\otimes y) = x \frown y$$,

where $\scriptstyle \frown$ denotes the cap product.

A chain complex C is called geometric if a chain homotopy exists between $\Delta$ and $\tau\Delta$, where $\tau \colon C\otimes C\to C\otimes C$ is the transposition/flip given by $\tau (a\otimes b) = b\otimes a$.

A geometric chain complex is called an algebraic Poincaré complex, of dimension n, if there exists an infinite-ordered element of the n-dimensional homology group, say $\mu \in H_n(C)$, such that the maps given by

$$(\frown\mu) \colon H^k(C) \to H_{n-k}(C)$$

are group isomorphisms for all $0 \le k \le n$. These isomorphisms are the isomorphisms of Poincaré duality.

== Example ==
- The singular chain complex of an orientable, closed n-dimensional manifold $M$ is an example of a Poincaré complex, where the duality isomorphisms are given by capping with the fundamental class $[M] \in H_{n}(M; \mathbb{Z})$.
