= Analytic torsion =

Topological invariant of manifolds that can distinguish homotopy-equivalent manifolds

In mathematics, Reidemeister torsion (or R-torsion, or Reidemeister–Franz torsion) is a topological invariant of manifolds introduced by Kurt Reidemeister (Reidemeister 1935) for 3-manifolds and generalized to higher dimensions by Wolfgang Franz (1935) and Georges de Rham (1936). Analytic torsion (or Ray–Singer torsion) is an invariant of Riemannian manifolds defined by Daniel B. Ray and Isadore M. Singer (1971, 1973a, 1973b) as an analytic analogue of Reidemeister torsion. Jeff Cheeger (1977, 1979) and Werner Müller (1978) proved Ray and Singer's conjecture that Reidemeister torsion and analytic torsion are the same for compact Riemannian manifolds.

Reidemeister torsion was the first invariant in algebraic topology that could distinguish between closed manifolds which are homotopy equivalent but not homeomorphic, and can thus be seen as the birth of geometric topology as a distinct field. It can be used to classify lens spaces.

Reidemeister torsion is closely related to Whitehead torsion; see (Milnor 1966). It has also given some important motivation to arithmetic topology; see (Mazur). For more recent work on torsion see the books (Turaev 2002) and (Nicolaescu 2002, 2003).

== Definition of analytic torsion ==
If M is a Riemannian manifold and E a vector bundle over M, then there is a Laplacian operator acting on the k-forms with values in E. If the eigenvalues on k-forms are λ_{j} then the zeta function ζ_{k} is defined to be

$$\zeta_k(s) = \sum_{\lambda_j>0}\lambda_j^{-s}$$

for s large, and this is extended to all complex s by analytic continuation. The zeta regularized determinant of the Laplacian acting on k-forms is

$$\Delta_k=\exp(-\zeta^\prime_k(0))$$

which is formally the product of the positive eigenvalues of the laplacian acting on k-forms. The analytic torsion T(M,E) is defined to be

$$T(M,E) = \exp\left(\sum_k (-1)^kk \zeta^\prime_k(0)/2\right) = \prod_k\Delta_k^{-(-1)^kk/2}.$$

== Definition of Reidemeister torsion ==
Let $X$ be a finite connected CW-complex with fundamental group $\pi := \pi_1(X)$ and universal cover ${\tilde X}$, and let $U$ be an orthogonal finite-dimensional $\pi$-representation. Suppose that

$$H^\pi_n(X;U) := H_n(U \otimes_{\mathbf{Z}[\pi]} C_*({\tilde X})) = 0$$

for all n. If we fix a cellular basis for $C_*({\tilde X})$ and an orthogonal $\mathbf{R}$-basis for $U$, then $D_* := U \otimes_{\mathbf{Z}[\pi]} C_*({\tilde X})$ is a contractible finite based free $\mathbf{R}$-chain complex. Let $\gamma_*: D_* \to D_{*+1}$ be any chain contraction of D_{*}, i.e. $d_{n+1} \circ \gamma_n + \gamma_{n-1} \circ d_n = id_{D_n}$ for all $n$. We obtain an isomorphism $(d_* + \gamma_*)_\text{odd}: D_\text{odd} \to D_\text{even}$ with $D_\text{odd} := \oplus_{n \, \text{odd}} \, D_n$, $D_\text{even} := \oplus_{n \, \text{even}} \, D_n$. We define the Reidemeister torsion

$$\rho(X;U) := |\det(A)|^{-1} \in \mathbf{R}^{>0}$$

where A is the matrix of $(d_* + \gamma_*)_\text{odd}$ with respect to the given bases. The Reidemeister torsion $\rho(X;U)$ is independent of the choice of the cellular basis for $C_*({\tilde X})$, the orthogonal basis for $U$ and the chain contraction $\gamma_*$.

Let $M$ be a compact smooth manifold, and let $\rho\colon\pi(M)\rightarrow GL(E)$ be a unimodular representation. $M$ has a smooth triangulation. For any choice of a volume $\mu\in\det H_*(M)$, we get an invariant $\tau_M(\rho:\mu)\in\mathbf{R}^+$. Then we call the positive real number $\tau_M(\rho:\mu)$ the Reidemeister torsion of the manifold $M$ with respect to $\rho$ and $\mu$.

== A short history of Reidemeister torsion ==
Reidemeister torsion was first used to combinatorially classify 3-dimensional lens spaces in (Reidemeister 1935) by Reidemeister, and in higher-dimensional spaces by Franz. The classification includes examples of homotopy equivalent 3-dimensional manifolds which are not homeomorphic — at the time (1935) the classification was only up to PL homeomorphism, but later E.J. Brody (1960) showed that this was in fact a classification up to homeomorphism.

J. H. C. Whitehead defined the "torsion" of a homotopy equivalence between finite complexes. This is a direct generalization of the Reidemeister, Franz, and de Rham concept; but is a more delicate invariant. Whitehead torsion provides a key tool for the study of combinatorial or differentiable manifolds with nontrivial fundamental group and is closely related to the concept of "simple homotopy type", see (Milnor 1966)

In 1960 Milnor discovered the duality relation of torsion invariants of manifolds and show that the (twisted) Alexander polynomial of knots is the Reidemeister torsion of its knot complement in $S^3$. (Milnor 1962) For each q the Poincaré duality $P_o$ induces

$$P_o\colon\operatorname{det}(H_q(M))\overset{\sim}{\,\longrightarrow\,}(\operatorname{det}(H_{n-q}(M)))^{-1}$$

and then we obtain

$$\Delta(t)=\pm t^n\Delta(1/t).$$

The representation of the fundamental group of knot complement plays a central role in them. It gives the relation between knot theory and torsion invariants.

== Cheeger–Müller theorem ==
Let $(M,g)$ be an orientable compact Riemann manifold of dimension n and $\rho\colon \pi(M)\rightarrow\mathop{GL}(E)$ a representation of the fundamental group of $M$ on a real vector space of dimension N. Then we can define the De Rham complex

$$\Lambda^0\stackrel{d_0}{\longrightarrow}\Lambda^1\stackrel{d_1}{\longrightarrow}\cdots\stackrel{d_{n-1}}{\longrightarrow}\Lambda^n$$

and the formal adjoint $d_p$ and $\delta_p$ due to the flatness of $E_q$. As usual, we also obtain the Hodge Laplacian on p-forms

$$\Delta_p=\delta_{p+1} d_p+d_{p-1}\delta_{p}.$$

Assuming that $\partial M=0$, the Laplacian is then a symmetric positive semi-positive elliptic operator with pure point spectrum

$$0\le\lambda_0\le\lambda_1\le\cdots\rightarrow\infty.$$

As before, we can therefore define a zeta function associated with the Laplacian $\Delta_q$ on $\Lambda^q(E)$ by

$$\zeta_q(s;\rho)=\sum_{\lambda_j >0}\lambda_j^{-s}=\frac{1}{\Gamma(s)}\int^\infty_0 t^{s-1}\text{Tr}(e^{-t\Delta_q} - P_q)dt,\ \ \ \text{Re}(s)>\frac{n}{2}$$

where $P$ is the projection of $L^2 \Lambda(E)$ onto the kernel space $\mathcal{H}^q(E)$ of the Laplacian $\Delta_q$. It was moreover shown by (Seeley 1967) that $\zeta_q(s;\rho)$ extends to a meromorphic function of $s\in\mathbf{C}$ which is holomorphic at $s=0$.

As in the case of an orthogonal representation, we define the analytic torsion $T_M(\rho;E)$ by

$$T_M(\rho;E) = \exp\biggl(\frac{1}{2}\sum^n_{q=0}(-l)^qq\frac{d}{ds}\zeta_q(s;\rho)\biggl|_{s=0}\biggr).$$

In 1971 D.B. Ray and I.M. Singer conjectured that $T_M(\rho;E)=\tau_M(\rho;\mu)$ for any unitary representation $\rho$. This Ray–Singer conjecture was eventually proved, independently, by Cheeger (1977, 1979) and Müller (1978). Both approaches focus on the logarithm of torsions and their traces. This is easier for odd-dimensional manifolds than in the even-dimensional case, which involves additional technical difficulties. This Cheeger–Müller theorem (that the two notions of torsion are equivalent), along with Atiyah–Patodi–Singer theorem, later provided the basis for Chern–Simons perturbation theory.

A proof of the Cheeger-Müller theorem for arbitrary representations was later given by J. M. Bismut and Weiping Zhang. Their proof uses the Witten deformation.
