= H-cobordism =

Concept in topology

In geometric topology and differential topology, an (n + 1)-dimensional cobordism W between n-dimensional manifolds M and N is an h-cobordism (the h stands for homotopy equivalence) if the inclusion maps

$$M \hookrightarrow W \quad\mbox{and}\quad N \hookrightarrow W$$

are homotopy equivalences.

The h-cobordism theorem gives sufficient conditions for an h-cobordism to be trivial, i.e., to be C-isomorphic to the cylinder M × [0, 1]. Here C refers to any of the categories of smooth, piecewise linear, or topological manifolds.

The theorem was first proved by Stephen Smale for which he received the Fields Medal and is a fundamental result in the theory of high-dimensional manifolds. For a start, it almost immediately proves the generalized Poincaré conjecture.

== Background ==
Before Smale proved this theorem, mathematicians became stuck while trying to understand manifolds of dimension 3 or 4, and assumed that the higher-dimensional cases were even harder. The h-cobordism theorem showed that (simply connected) manifolds of dimension at least 5 are much easier than those of dimension 3 or 4. The proof of the theorem depends on the "Whitney trick" of Hassler Whitney, which geometrically untangles homologically untangled spheres of complementary dimension in a manifold of dimension >4. An informal reason why manifolds of dimension 3 or 4 are unusually hard is that the trick fails to work in lower dimensions, which have no room for entanglement.

== Precise statement of the h-cobordism theorem ==
Let n be at least 5 and let W be a compact (n + 1)-dimensional h-cobordism between M and N in the category C=Diff, PL, or Top such that W, M and N are simply connected. Then W is C-isomorphic to M × [0, 1]. The isomorphism can be chosen to be the identity on M × {0}.

This means that the homotopy equivalence between M and N (or, between M × [0, 1], W and N × [0, 1]) is homotopic to a C-isomorphism.

== Lower dimensional versions ==
For n = 4, the topological h-cobordism theorem was proved by Michael Freedman. The smooth 4-dimensional h-cobordism theorem was disproved by Simon Donaldson.

For n = 3, the h-cobordism theorem for smooth manifolds has not been proved and, due to the 3-dimensional Poincaré conjecture, is equivalent to the hard open question of whether the 4-sphere has non-standard (exotic) smooth structures.

For n = 2, the h-cobordism theorem is equivalent to the Poincaré conjecture stated by Poincaré in 1904 (one of the Millennium Problems) and was proved by Grigori Perelman in a series of three papers in 2002 and 2003, where he follows Richard S. Hamilton's program using Ricci flow.

For n = 1, the h-cobordism theorem is vacuously true, since there is no closed simply-connected 1-dimensional manifold.

For n = 0, the h-cobordism theorem is trivially true: the interval is the only connected cobordism between connected 0-manifolds.

== A proof sketch ==
A Morse function $f:W\to[a,b]$ induces a handle decomposition of W, i.e., if there is a single critical point of index k in $f^{-1}([c,c'])$, then the ascending cobordism $W_{c'}$ is obtained from $W_c$ by attaching a k-handle. The goal of the proof is to find a handle decomposition with no handles at all so that integrating the non-zero gradient vector field of f gives the desired diffeomorphism to the trivial cobordism.

This is achieved through a series of techniques.

1) Handle rearrangement

First, we want to rearrange all handles by order so that lower order handles are attached first. The question is thus when can we slide an i-handle off of a j-handle? This can be done by a radial isotopy so long as the i attaching sphere and the j belt sphere do not intersect. We thus want $(i-1)+(n-j)\leq\dim\partial W-1=n-1$ which is equivalent to $i\leq j$.

We then define the handle chain complex $(C_*,\partial_*)$ by letting $C_k$ be the free abelian group on the k-handles and defining $\partial_k:C_k\to C_{k-1}$ by sending a k-handle $h_{\alpha}^k$ to $\sum_\beta \langle h_\alpha^k\mid h_\beta^{k-1}\rangle h_\beta^{k-1}$, where $\langle h_\alpha^k\mid h_\beta^{k-1}\rangle$ is the intersection number of the k-attaching sphere and the (k − 1)-belt sphere.

2) Handle cancellation

Next, we want to "cancel" handles. The idea is that attaching a k-handle $h_\alpha^k$ might create a hole that can be filled in by attaching a (k + 1)-handle $h_\beta^{k+1}$. This would imply that $\partial_{k+1}h_\beta^{k+1}=\pm h_\alpha^k$ and so the $(\alpha,\beta)$ entry in the matrix of $\partial_{k+1}$ would be $\pm 1$. However, when is this condition sufficient? That is, when can we geometrically cancel handles if this condition is true? The answer lies in carefully analyzing when the manifold remains simply-connected after removing the attaching and belt spheres in question, and finding an embedded disk using the Whitney trick. This analysis leads to the requirement that n must be at least 5. Moreover, during the proof one requires that the cobordism has no 0-,1-,n-, or (n + 1)-handles which is obtained by the next technique.

3) Handle trading

The idea of handle trading is to create a cancelling pair of (k + 1)- and (k + 2)-handles so that a given k-handle cancels with the (k + 1)-handle leaving behind the (k + 2)-handle. To do this, consider the core of the k-handle which is an element in $\pi_k(W,M)$. This group is trivial since W is an h-cobordism. Thus, there is a disk $D^{k+1}$ which we can fatten to a cancelling pair as desired, so long as we can embed this disk into the boundary of W. This embedding exists if $\dim\partial W-1=n-1\geq 2(k+1)$. Since we are assuming n is at least 5 this means that k is either 0 or 1. Finally, by considering the negative of the given Morse function, −f, we can turn the handle decomposition upside down and also remove the n- and (n + 1)-handles as desired.

4) Handle sliding

Finally, we want to make sure that doing row and column operations on $\partial_k$ corresponds to a geometric operation. Indeed, it isn't hard to show (best done by drawing a picture) that sliding a k-handle $h_\alpha^k$ over another k-handle $h_{\beta}^k$ replaces $h_\alpha^k$ by $h_\alpha^k\pm h_\beta^k$ in the basis for $C_k$.

The proof of the theorem now follows: the handle chain complex is exact since $H_*(W,M;\mathbb{Z})=0$. Thus $C_k\cong \operatorname{coker} \partial_{k+1}\oplus\operatorname{im} \partial_{k+1}$ since the $C_k$ are free. Then $\partial_k$, which is an integer matrix, restricts to an invertible morphism which can thus be diagonalized via elementary row operations (handle sliding) and must have only $\pm 1$ on the diagonal because it is invertible. Thus, all handles are paired with a single other cancelling handle yielding a decomposition with no handles.

== The s-cobordism theorem ==
If the assumption that M and N are simply connected is dropped, h-cobordisms need not be cylinders; the obstruction is exactly the Whitehead torsion τ (W, M) of the inclusion $M \hookrightarrow W$.

Precisely, the s-cobordism theorem (the s stands for simple-homotopy equivalence), proved independently by Barry Mazur, John Stallings, and Dennis Barden, states (assumptions as above but where M and N need not be simply connected):

An h-cobordism is a cylinder if and only if Whitehead torsion τ (W, M) vanishes.

The torsion vanishes if and only if the inclusion $M \hookrightarrow W$ is not just a homotopy equivalence, but a simple homotopy equivalence.

Note that one need not assume that the other inclusion $N \hookrightarrow W$ is also a simple homotopy equivalence—that follows from the theorem.

Categorically, h-cobordisms form a groupoid.

Then a finer statement of the s-cobordism theorem is that the isomorphism classes of this groupoid (up to C-isomorphism of h-cobordisms) are torsors for the respective Whitehead groups Wh(π), where $\pi \cong \pi_1(M) \cong \pi_1(W) \cong \pi_1(N).$

== Wall theorems ==
Wall's theorem on h-cobordisms claims, that simply connected closed smooth 4-manifolds with isomorphic intersection form are even h-cobordant. Wall's theorem on stabilization claims, that for h-cobordant simply connected closed smooth 4-manifolds $M$ and $N$, there exists a natural number $n\in\mathbb{N}$ and a diffeomorphism $M\#n(S^2\times S^2)\cong N\#n(S^2\times S^2)$.

== See also ==
- Semi-s-cobordism
