= Whitehead torsion =

In geometric topology, a field within mathematics, the obstruction to a homotopy equivalence $f\colon X \to Y$ of finite CW-complexes being a simple homotopy equivalence is its Whitehead torsion $\tau(f)$ which is an element in the Whitehead group $\operatorname{Wh}(\pi_1(Y))$. These concepts are named after the mathematician J. H. C. Whitehead.

The Whitehead torsion is important in applying surgery theory to non-simply connected manifolds of dimension > 4: for simply-connected manifolds, the Whitehead group vanishes, and thus homotopy equivalences and simple homotopy equivalences are the same. The applications are to differentiable manifolds, PL manifolds and topological manifolds. The proofs were first obtained in the early 1960s by Stephen Smale, for differentiable manifolds. The development of handlebody theory allowed much the same proofs in the differentiable and PL categories. The proofs are much harder in the topological category, requiring the theory of Robion Kirby and Laurent C. Siebenmann. The restriction to manifolds of dimension greater than four are due to the application of the Whitney trick for removing double points.

In generalizing the h-cobordism theorem, which is a statement about simply connected manifolds, to non-simply connected manifolds, one must distinguish simple homotopy equivalences and non-simple homotopy equivalences. While an h-cobordism W between simply-connected closed connected manifolds M and N of dimension n > 4 is isomorphic to a cylinder (the corresponding homotopy equivalence can be taken to be a diffeomorphism, PL-isomorphism, or homeomorphism, respectively), the s-cobordism theorem states that if the manifolds are not simply-connected, an h-cobordism is a cylinder if and only if the Whitehead torsion of the inclusion $M \hookrightarrow W$ vanishes.

== Whitehead group ==
The Whitehead group of a connected CW-complex or a manifold M is equal to the Whitehead group $\operatorname{Wh}(\pi_1(M))$ of the fundamental group $\pi_1(M)$ of M.

If G is a group, the Whitehead group $\operatorname{Wh}(G)$ is defined to be the cokernel of the map $G\times \{\pm1\} \to K_1(\Z[G])$ which sends (g, ±1) to the invertible (1,1)-matrix (±g). Here $\Z[G]$ is the group ring of G. Recall that the K-group K_{1}(A) of a ring A is defined as the quotient of GL(A) by the subgroup generated by elementary matrices. The group GL(A) is the direct limit of the finite-dimensional groups GL(n, A) → GL(n+1, A); concretely, the group of invertible infinite matrices which differ from the identity matrix in only a finite number of coefficients. An elementary matrix here is a transvection: one such that all main diagonal elements are 1 and there is at most one non-zero element not on the diagonal. The subgroup generated by elementary matrices is exactly the derived subgroup, in other words the smallest normal subgroup such that the quotient by it is abelian.

In other words, the Whitehead group $\operatorname{Wh}(G)$ of a group G is the quotient of $\operatorname{GL}(\Z[G])$ by the subgroup generated by elementary matrices, elements of G and $\pm 1$. Notice that this is the same as the quotient of the reduced K-group $\tilde{K}_1(\Z[G])$ by G.

== Examples ==
- The Whitehead group of the trivial group is trivial. Since the group ring of the trivial group is $\Z,$ we have to show that any matrix can be written as a product of elementary matrices times a diagonal matrix; this follows easily from the fact that $\Z$ is a Euclidean domain.
- The Whitehead group of a free abelian group is trivial, a 1964 result of Hyman Bass, Alex Heller and Richard Swan. This is quite hard to prove, but is important as it is used in the proof that an s-cobordism of dimension at least 6 whose ends are tori is a product. It is also the key algebraic result used in the surgery theory classification of piecewise linear manifolds of dimension at least 5 which are homotopy equivalent to a torus; this is the essential ingredient of the 1969 Kirby–Siebenmann structure theory of topological manifolds of dimension at least 5.
- The Whitehead group of a braid group (or any subgroup of a braid group) is trivial. This was proved by F. Thomas Farrell and Sayed K. Roushon.
- The Whitehead group of a finite cyclic group of order n is trivial if and only if n is 1, 2, 3, 4, or 6.
- The Whitehead group of the cyclic group of order 5 is $\Z$. This was proved in 1940 by Graham Higman. An example of a non-trivial unit in the group ring arises from the identity $(1-t-t^4)(1-t^2-t^3)=1,$ where t is a generator of the cyclic group of order 5. This example is closely related to the existence of units of infinite order (in particular, the golden ratio) in the ring of integers of the cyclotomic field generated by fifth roots of unity.
- The Whitehead group of any finite group G is finitely generated, of rank equal to the number of irreducible real representations of G minus the number of irreducible rational representations. This was proved in 1965 by Bass.
- If G is a finite cyclic group then $K_1(\Z[G])$ is isomorphic to the units of the group ring $\Z[G]$ under the determinant map, so Wh(G) is just the group of units of $\Z[G]$ modulo the group of "trivial units" generated by elements of G and −1.
- It is a well-known conjecture that the Whitehead group of any torsion-free group should vanish.

== The Whitehead torsion ==
At first we define the Whitehead torsion $\tau(h_*) \in {\tilde K}_1(R)$ for a chain homotopy equivalence $h_*: D_* \to E_*$ of finite based free R-chain complexes. We can assign to the homotopy equivalence its mapping cone C_{*} := cone_{*}(h_{*}) which is a contractible finite based free R-chain complex. Let $\gamma_*: C_* \to C_{*+1}$ be any chain contraction of the mapping cone, i.e., $c_{n+1} \circ \gamma_n + \gamma_{n-1} \circ c_n = \operatorname{id}_{C_n}$ for all n. We obtain an isomorphism $(c_* + \gamma_*)_\mathrm{odd}: C_\mathrm{odd} \to C_\mathrm{even}$ with

$$C_\mathrm{odd} := \bigoplus_{n \text{ odd}} C_n,\qquad C_\mathrm{even} := \bigoplus_{n \text{ even}} C_n.$$

We define $\tau(h_*) := [A] \in {\tilde K}_1(R)$, where A is the matrix of $(c_* + \gamma_*)_{\rm odd}$ with respect to the given bases.

For a homotopy equivalence $f: X\to Y$ of connected finite CW-complexes we define the Whitehead torsion $\tau(f) \in \operatorname{Wh}(\pi_1(Y))$ as follows. Let ${\tilde f}: {\tilde X} \to {\tilde Y}$ be the lift of $f: X \to Y$ to the universal covering. It induces $\Z[\pi_1(Y)]$-chain homotopy equivalences $C_*({\tilde f}): C_*({\tilde X}) \to C_*({\tilde Y})$. Now we can apply the definition of the Whitehead torsion for a chain homotopy equivalence and obtain an element in ${\tilde K}_1(\Z[\pi_1(Y)])$ which we map to Wh(π_{1}(Y)). This is the Whitehead torsion τ(ƒ) ∈ Wh(π_{1}(Y)).

== Properties ==
Homotopy invariance: Let $f,g\colon X\to Y$ be homotopy equivalences of finite connected CW-complexes. If f and g are homotopic, then $\tau(f) = \tau(g)$.

Topological invariance: If $f\colon X\to Y$ is a homeomorphism of finite connected CW-complexes, then $\tau(f) = 0$.

Composition formula: Let $f\colon X\to Y$, $g\colon Y\to Z$ be homotopy equivalences of finite connected CW-complexes. Then $\tau(g \circ f) = g_* \tau(f) + \tau(g)$.

== Geometric interpretation ==
The s-cobordism theorem states for a closed connected oriented manifold M of dimension n > 4 that an h-cobordism W between M and another manifold N is trivial over M if and only if the Whitehead torsion of the inclusion $M\hookrightarrow W$ vanishes. Moreover, for any element in the Whitehead group there exists an h-cobordism W over M whose Whitehead torsion is the considered element. The proofs use handle decompositions.

There exists a homotopy theoretic analogue of the s-cobordism theorem. Given a CW-complex A, consider the set of all pairs of CW-complexes (X, A) such that the inclusion of A into X is a homotopy equivalence. Two pairs (X_{1}, A) and (X_{2}, A) are said to be equivalent, if there is a simple homotopy equivalence between X_{1} and X_{2} relative to A. The set of such equivalence classes form a group where the addition is given by taking union of X_{1} and X_{2} with common subspace A. This group is natural isomorphic to the Whitehead group Wh(A) of the CW-complex A. The proof of this fact is similar to the proof of s-cobordism theorem.

== See also ==
- Algebraic K-theory
- Reidemeister torsion
- s-Cobordism theorem
- Wall's finiteness obstruction
