= Surgery obstruction =

Map from the normal invariants to the L-groups

In mathematics, specifically in surgery theory, the surgery obstructions define a map $\theta \colon \mathcal{N} (X) \to L_n (\pi_1 (X))$ from the normal invariants to the L-groups which is in the first instance a set-theoretic map (that means not necessarily a homomorphism) with the following property when $n \geq 5$:

A degree-one normal map $(f,b) \colon M \to X$ is normally cobordant to a homotopy equivalence if and only if the image $\theta (f,b)=0$ in $L_n (\mathbb{Z} [\pi_1 (X)])$.

== Sketch of the definition ==
The surgery obstruction of a degree-one normal map has a relatively complicated definition.

Consider a degree-one normal map $(f,b) \colon M \to X$. The idea in deciding the question whether it is normally cobordant to a homotopy equivalence is to try to systematically improve $(f,b)$ so that the map $f$ becomes $m$-connected (that means the homotopy groups $\pi_* (f)=0$ for $* \leq m$) for high $m$. It is a consequence of Poincaré duality that if we can achieve this for $m > \lfloor n/2 \rfloor$ then the map $f$ already is a homotopy equivalence. The word systematically above refers to the fact that one tries to do surgeries on $M$ to kill elements of $\pi_i (f)$. In fact it is more convenient to use homology of the universal covers to observe how connected the map $f$ is. More precisely, one works with the surgery kernels $K_i (\tilde M) : = \mathrm{ker} \{f_* \colon H_i (\tilde M) \rightarrow H_i (\tilde X)\}$ which one views as $\mathbb{Z}[\pi_1 (X)]$-modules. If all these vanish, then the map $f$ is a homotopy equivalence. As a consequence of Poincaré duality on $M$ and $X$ there is a $\mathbb{Z}[\pi_1 (X)]$-modules Poincaré duality $K^{n-i} (\tilde M) \cong K_i (\tilde M)$, so one only has to watch half of them, that means those for which $i \leq \lfloor n/2 \rfloor$.

Any degree-one normal map can be made $\lfloor n/2 \rfloor$-connected by the process called surgery below the middle dimension. This is the process of killing elements of $K_i (\tilde M)$ for $i < \lfloor n/2 \rfloor$ described here when we have $p+q = n$ such that $i = p < \lfloor n/2 \rfloor$. After this is done there are two cases.

1. If $n=2k$ then the only nontrivial homology group is the kernel $K_k (\tilde M) : = \mathrm{ker} \{f_* \colon H_k (\tilde M) \rightarrow H_k (\tilde X)\}$. It turns out that the cup-product pairings on $M$ and $X$ induce a cup-product pairing on $K_k(\tilde M)$. This defines a symmetric bilinear form in case $k=2l$ and a skew-symmetric bilinear form in case $k=2l+1$. It turns out that these forms can be refined to $\varepsilon$-quadratic forms, where $\varepsilon = (-1)^k$. These $\varepsilon$-quadratic forms define elements in the L-groups $L_n (\pi_1 (X))$.

2. If $n=2k+1$ the definition is more complicated. Instead of a quadratic form one obtains from the geometry a quadratic formation, which is a kind of automorphism of quadratic forms. Such a thing defines an element in the odd-dimensional L-group $L_n (\pi_1 (X))$.

If the element $\theta (f,b)$ is zero in the L-group surgery can be done on $M$ to modify $f$ to a homotopy equivalence.

Geometrically the reason why this is not always possible is that performing surgery in the middle dimension to kill an element in $K_k (\tilde M)$ possibly creates an element in $K_{k-1} (\tilde M)$ when $n = 2k$ or in $K_{k} (\tilde M)$ when $n=2k+1$. So this possibly destroys what has already been achieved. However, if $\theta (f,b)$ is zero, surgeries can be arranged in such a way that this does not happen.

== Example ==
In the simply connected case the following happens.

If $n = 2k+1$ there is no obstruction.

If $n = 4l$ then the surgery obstruction can be calculated as the difference of the signatures of M and X.

If $n = 4l+2$ then the surgery obstruction is the Arf-invariant of the associated kernel quadratic form over $\mathbb{Z}_2$.
