= Simple-homotopy equivalence =

In mathematics, particularly the area of topology, a simple-homotopy equivalence is a refinement of the concept of homotopy equivalence. Two CW-complexes are simple-homotopy equivalent if they are related by a sequence of collapses and expansions (inverses of collapses), and a homotopy equivalence is a simple homotopy equivalence if it is homotopic to such a map.

The obstruction to a homotopy equivalence being a simple homotopy equivalence is the Whitehead torsion, $\tau(f).$

A homotopy theory that studies simple-homotopy types is called simple homotopy theory.

== See also ==
- Discrete Morse theory
