= Geometric topology =

Branch of mathematics studying (smooth) functions of manifolds

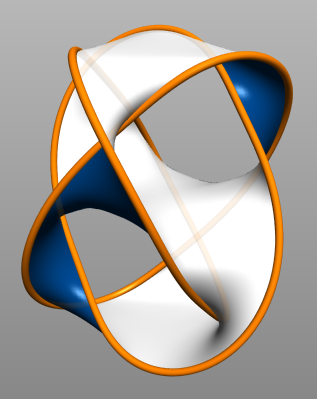
A Seifert surface bounded by a set of Borromean rings; these surfaces can be used as tools in geometric topology

In mathematics, geometric topology is the study of manifolds and maps between them, particularly embeddings of one manifold into another.

== History ==
Geometric topology as an area distinct from algebraic topology may be said to have originated in the 1935 classification of lens spaces by Reidemeister torsion, which required distinguishing spaces that are homotopy equivalent but not homeomorphic. This was the origin of simple homotopy theory. The use of the term geometric topology to describe these seems to have originated rather recently.

== Differences between low-dimensional and high-dimensional topology ==
Manifolds differ radically in behavior in high and low dimension.

High-dimensional topology refers to manifolds of dimension 5 and above, or in relative terms, embeddings in codimension 3 and above. Low-dimensional topology is concerned with questions in dimensions up to 4, or embeddings in codimension up to 2.

Dimension 4 is special, in that in some respects (topologically), dimension 4 is high-dimensional, while in other respects (differentiably), dimension 4 is low-dimensional; this overlap yields phenomena exceptional to dimension 4, such as exotic differentiable structures on R^{4}. Thus the topological classification of 4-manifolds is in principle tractable, and the key questions are: does a topological manifold admit a differentiable structure, and if so, how many? Notably, the smooth case of dimension 4 is the last open case of the generalized Poincaré conjecture; see Gluck twists.

The distinction is because surgery theory works in dimension 5 and above (in fact, in many cases, it works topologically in dimension 4, though this is very involved to prove), and thus the behavior of manifolds in dimension 5 and above may be studied using the surgery theory program. In dimension 4 and below (topologically, in dimension 3 and below), surgery theory does not work. Indeed, one approach to discussing low-dimensional manifolds is to ask "what would surgery theory predict to be true, were it to work?" – and then understand low-dimensional phenomena as deviations from this.

The Whitney trick requires 2+1 dimensions, hence surgery theory requires 5 dimensions.

The precise reason for the difference at dimension 5 is because the Whitney embedding theorem, the key technical trick which underlies surgery theory, requires 2+1 dimensions. Roughly, the Whitney trick allows one to "unknot" knotted spheres – more precisely, remove self-intersections of immersions; it does this via a homotopy of a disk – the disk has 2 dimensions, and the homotopy adds 1 more – and thus in codimension greater than 2, this can be done without intersecting itself; hence embeddings in codimension greater than 2 can be understood by surgery. In surgery theory, the key step is in the middle dimension, and thus when the middle dimension has codimension more than 2 (loosely, 2½ is enough, hence total dimension 5 is enough), the Whitney trick works. The key consequence of this is Smale's h-cobordism theorem, which works in dimension 5 and above, and forms the basis for surgery theory.

A modification of the Whitney trick can work in 4 dimensions, and is called Casson handles – because there are not enough dimensions, a Whitney disk introduces new kinks, which can be resolved by another Whitney disk, leading to a sequence ("tower") of disks. The limit of this tower yields a topological but not differentiable map, hence surgery works topologically but not differentiably in dimension 4.

== Important tools in geometric topology ==
=== Fundamental group ===
In all dimensions, the fundamental group of a manifold is a very important invariant, and determines much of the structure; in dimensions 1, 2 and 3, the possible fundamental groups are restricted, while in dimension 4 and above every finitely presented group is the fundamental group of a manifold (note that it is sufficient to show this for 4- and 5-dimensional manifolds, and then to take products with spheres to get higher ones).

=== Orientability ===
A manifold is orientable if it has a consistent choice of orientation, and a connected orientable manifold has exactly two different possible orientations. In this setting, various equivalent formulations of orientability can be given, depending on the desired application and level of generality. Formulations applicable to general topological manifolds often employ methods of homology theory, whereas for differentiable manifolds more structure is present, allowing a formulation in terms of differential forms. An important generalization of the notion of orientability of a space is that of orientability of a family of spaces parameterized by some other space (a fiber bundle) for which an orientation must be selected in each of the spaces which varies continuously with respect to changes in the parameter values.

=== Handle decompositions ===
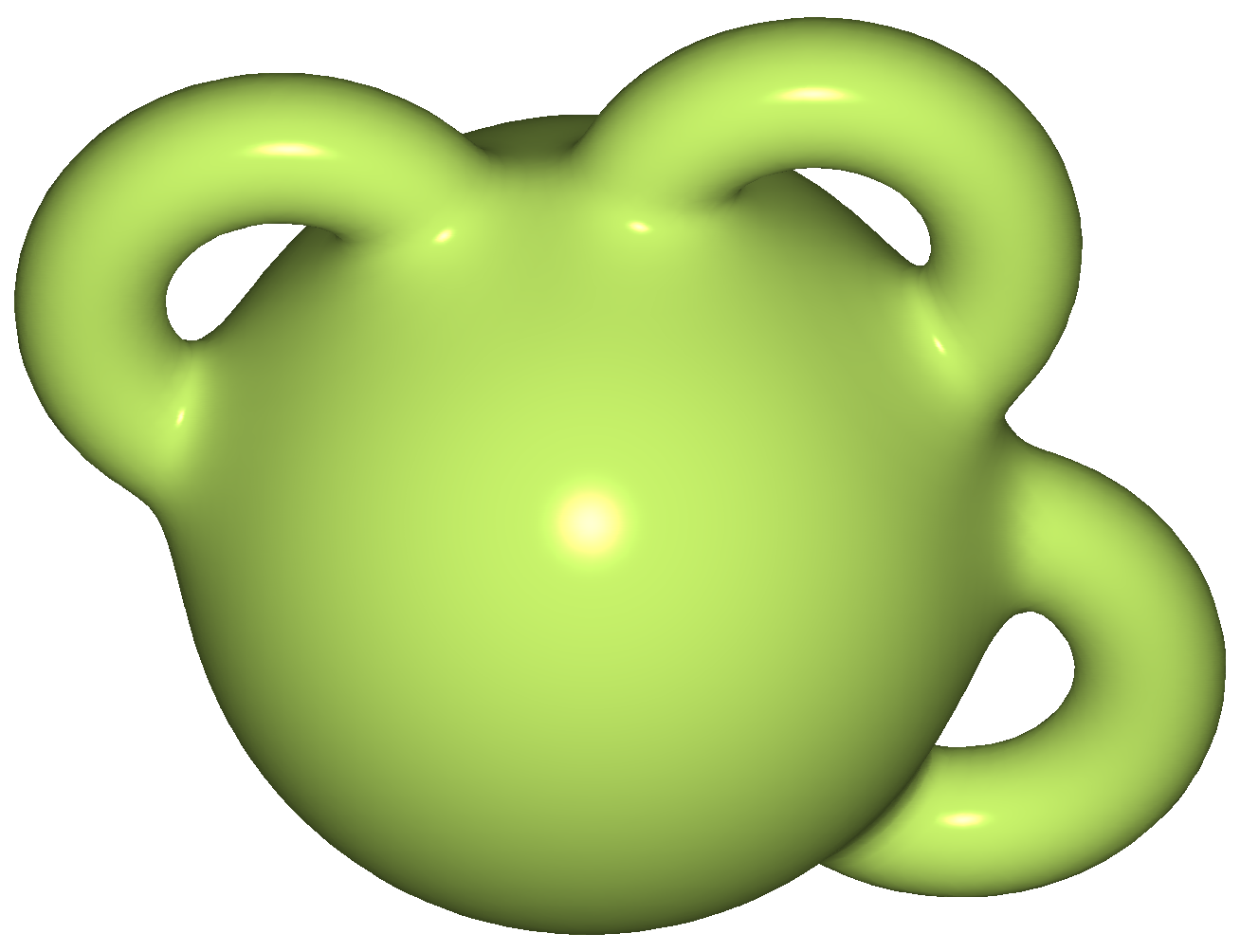
A 3-ball with three 1-handles attached.

A handle decomposition of an m-manifold M is a union

$$\emptyset = M_{-1} \subset M_0 \subset M_1 \subset M_2 \subset \dots \subset M_{m-1} \subset M_m = M$$

where each $M_i$ is obtained from $M_{i-1}$ by the attaching of $i$-handles. A handle decomposition is to a manifold what a CW-decomposition is to a topological space—in many regards the purpose of a handle decomposition is to have a language analogous to CW-complexes, but adapted to the world of smooth manifolds. Thus an i-handle is the smooth analogue of an i-cell. Handle decompositions of manifolds arise naturally via Morse theory. The modification of handle structures is closely linked to Cerf theory.

=== Local flatness ===
Local flatness is a property of a submanifold in a topological manifold of larger dimension. In the category of topological manifolds, locally flat submanifolds play a role similar to that of embedded submanifolds in the category of smooth manifolds.

Suppose a d dimensional manifold N is embedded into an n dimensional manifold M (where d < n). If $x \in N,$ we say N is locally flat at x if there is a neighborhood $U \subset M$ of x such that the topological pair $(U, U\cap N)$ is homeomorphic to the pair $(\mathbb{R}^n,\mathbb{R}^d)$, with a standard inclusion of $\mathbb{R}^d$ as a subspace of $\mathbb{R}^n$. That is, there exists a homeomorphism $U\to \mathbb{R}^n$ such that the image of $U\cap N$ coincides with $\mathbb{R}^d$.

=== Schönflies theorems ===
The generalized Schoenflies theorem states that, if an (n − 1)-dimensional sphere S is embedded into the n-dimensional sphere S^{n} in a locally flat way (that is, the embedding extends to that of a thickened sphere), then the pair (S^{n}, S) is homeomorphic to the pair (S^{n}, S^{n−1}), where S^{n−1} is the equator of the n-sphere. Brown and Mazur received the Veblen Prize for their independent proofs of this theorem.

== Branches of geometric topology ==
=== Low-dimensional topology ===
Low-dimensional topology includes:

- Surfaces (2-manifolds)
- 3-manifolds
- 4-manifolds

each have their own theory, where there are some connections.

Low-dimensional topology is strongly geometric, as reflected in the uniformization theorem in 2 dimensions – every surface admits a constant curvature metric; geometrically, it has one of 3 possible geometries: positive curvature/spherical, zero curvature/flat, negative curvature/hyperbolic – and the geometrization conjecture (now theorem) in 3 dimensions – every 3-manifold can be cut into pieces, each of which has one of 8 possible geometries.

2-dimensional topology can be studied as complex geometry in one variable (Riemann surfaces are complex curves) – by the uniformization theorem every conformal class of metrics is equivalent to a unique complex one, and 4-dimensional topology can be studied from the point of view of complex geometry in two variables (complex surfaces), though not every 4-manifold admits a complex structure.

=== Knot theory ===
Knot theory is the study of mathematical knots. While inspired by knots which appear in daily life in shoelaces and rope, a mathematician's knot differs in that the ends are joined together so that it cannot be undone. In mathematical language, a knot is an embedding of a circle in 3-dimensional Euclidean space, R^{3} (since we're using topology, a circle isn't bound to the classical geometric concept, but to all of its homeomorphisms). Two mathematical knots are equivalent if one can be transformed into the other via a deformation of R^{3} upon itself (known as an ambient isotopy); these transformations correspond to manipulations of a knotted string that do not involve cutting the string or passing the string through itself.

To gain further insight, mathematicians have generalized the knot concept in several ways. Knots can be considered in other three-dimensional spaces and objects other than circles can be used; see knot (mathematics). Higher-dimensional knots are n-dimensional spheres in m-dimensional Euclidean space.

=== High-dimensional geometric topology ===
In high-dimensional topology, characteristic classes are a basic invariant, and surgery theory is a key theory.

A characteristic class is a way of associating to each principal bundle on a topological space X a cohomology class of X. The cohomology class measures the extent to which the bundle is "twisted" — particularly, whether it possesses sections or not. In other words, characteristic classes are global invariants which measure the deviation of a local product structure from a global product structure. They are one of the unifying geometric concepts in algebraic topology, differential geometry and algebraic geometry.

Surgery theory is a collection of techniques used to produce one manifold from another in a 'controlled' way, introduced by Milnor (1961). Surgery refers to cutting out parts of the manifold and replacing it with a part of another manifold, matching up along the cut or boundary. This is closely related to, but not identical with, handlebody decompositions. It is a major tool in the study and classification of manifolds of dimension greater than 3.

More technically, the idea is to start with a well-understood manifold M and perform surgery on it to produce a manifold M ′ having some desired property, in such a way that the effects on the homology, homotopy groups, or other interesting invariants of the manifold are known.

The classification of exotic spheres by Kervaire and Milnor (1963) led to the emergence of surgery theory as a major tool in high-dimensional topology.

== See also ==
- Category:Maps of manifolds
- List of geometric topology topics
- Plumbing (mathematics)
- Surgery theory
