= Satellite knot =

Type of mathematical knot

In the mathematical theory of knots, a satellite knot is a knot that contains an incompressible, non boundary-parallel torus in its complement. Every knot is either hyperbolic, a torus, or a satellite knot. The class of satellite knots include composite knots, cable knots, and Whitehead doubles. A satellite link is one that orbits a companion knot K in the sense that it lies inside a regular neighborhood of the companion.

A satellite knot $K$ can be picturesquely described as follows: start by taking a nontrivial knot $K'$ lying inside an unknotted solid torus $V$. Here "nontrivial" means that the knot $K'$ is not allowed to sit inside of a 3-ball in $V$ and $K'$ is not allowed to be isotopic to the central core curve of the solid torus. Then tie up the solid torus into a nontrivial knot.

This means there is a non-trivial embedding $f\colon V \to S^3$ and $K = f\left(K'\right)$. The central core curve of the solid torus $V$ is sent to a knot $H$, which is called the "companion knot" and is thought of as the planet around which the "satellite knot" $K$ orbits. The construction ensures that $f(\partial V)$ is a non-boundary parallel incompressible torus in the complement of $K$. Composite knots contain a certain kind of incompressible torus called a swallow-follow torus, which can be visualized as swallowing one summand and following another summand.

Since $V$ is an unknotted solid torus, $S^3 \setminus V$ is a tubular neighbourhood of an unknot $J$. The 2-component link $K' \cup J$ together with the embedding $f$ is called the pattern associated to the satellite operation.

A convention: people usually demand that the embedding $f \colon V \to S^3$ is untwisted in the sense that $f$ must send the standard longitude of $V$ to the standard longitude of $f(V)$. Said another way, given any two disjoint curves $c_1, c_2 \subset V$, $f$ preserves their linking numbers i.e.: $\operatorname{lk}(f(c_1), f(c_2)) = \operatorname{lk}(c_1, c_2)$.

== Basic families ==
When $K' \subset \partial V$ is a torus knot, then $K$ is called a cable knot. Examples 3 and 4 are cable knots. The cable constructed with given winding numbers (m,n) from another knot K, is often called the (m,n) cable of K.

If $K'$ is a non-trivial knot in $S^3$ and if a compressing disc for $V$ intersects $K'$ in precisely one point, then $K$ is called a connect-sum. Another way to say this is that the pattern $K' \cup J$ is the connect-sum of a non-trivial knot $K'$ with a Hopf link.

If the link $K' \cup J$ is the Whitehead link, $K$ is called a Whitehead double. If $f$ is untwisted, $K$ is called an untwisted Whitehead double.

== Examples ==
Example 1: A connect-sum of a trefoil and figure-8 knot.

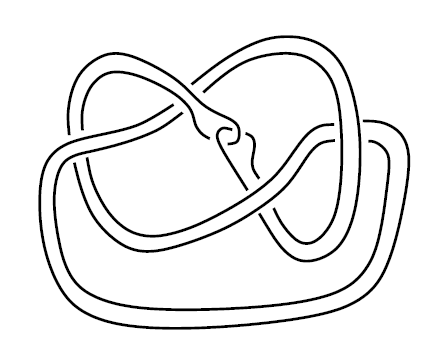
Example 2: The Whitehead double of the figure-8.

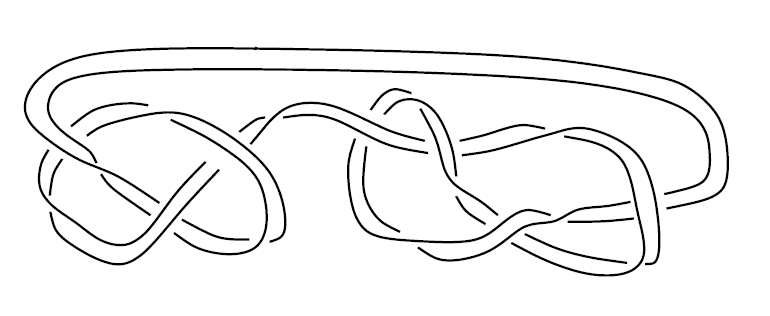
Example 3: A cable of a connect-sum.

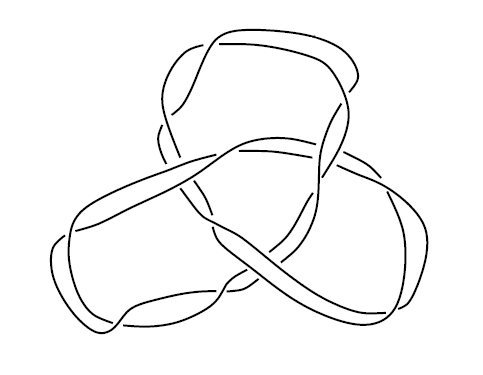
Example 4: A cable of a trefoil.

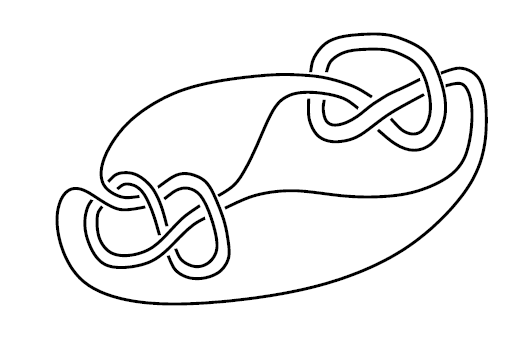
Example 5: A knot which is a 2-fold satellite i.e.: it has non-parallel swallow-follow tori.

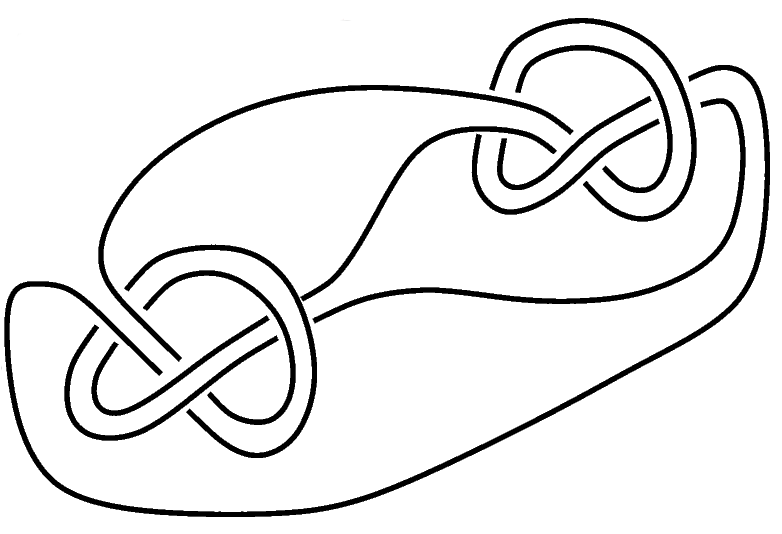
Example 6: A knot which is a 2-fold satellite i.e.: it has non-parallel swallow-follow tori.

Examples 5 and 6 are variants on the same construction. They both have two non-parallel, non-boundary-parallel incompressible tori in their complements, splitting the complement into the union of three manifolds. In 5, those manifolds are: the Borromean rings complement, trefoil complement, and figure-8 complement. In 6, the figure-8 complement is replaced by another trefoil complement.

== Origins ==
In 1949 Horst Schubert proved that every oriented knot in $S^3$ decomposes as a connect-sum of prime knots in a unique way, up to reordering, making the monoid of oriented isotopy-classes of knots in $S^3$ a free commutative monoid on countably-infinite many generators. Shortly after, he realized he could give a new proof of his theorem by a close analysis of the incompressible tori present in the complement of a connect-sum. This led him to study general incompressible tori in knot complements in his epic work Knoten und Vollringe, where he defined satellite and companion knots.

== Follow-up work ==
Schubert's demonstration that incompressible tori play a major role in knot theory was one several early insights leading to the unification of 3-manifold theory and knot theory. It attracted Waldhausen's attention, who later used incompressible surfaces to show that a large class of 3-manifolds are homeomorphic if and only if their fundamental groups are isomorphic. Waldhausen conjectured what is now the Jaco–Shalen–Johannson-decomposition of 3-manifolds, which is a decomposition of 3-manifolds along spheres and incompressible tori. This later became a major ingredient in the development of geometrization, which can be seen as a partial-classification of 3-dimensional manifolds. The ramifications for knot theory were first described in the long-unpublished manuscript of Bonahon and Siebenmann.

== Uniqueness of satellite decomposition ==
In Knoten und Vollringe, Schubert proved that in some cases, there is essentially a unique way to express a knot as a satellite. But there are also many known examples where the decomposition is not unique. With a suitably enhanced notion of satellite operation called splicing, the JSJ decomposition gives a proper uniqueness theorem for satellite knots.

== See also ==
- Hyperbolic knot
- Torus knot
- Bing double
