= Graph manifold =

In topology, a graph manifold (in German: Graphenmannigfaltigkeit) is a 3-manifold which is obtained by gluing some circle bundles. They were discovered and classified by the German topologist Friedhelm Waldhausen in 1967. This definition allows a very convenient combinatorial description as a graph whose vertices are the fundamental parts and (decorated) edges stand for the description of the gluing, hence the name.

More precisely, a compact orientable 3-manifold $M$ is said to be a graph manifold if there is a finite collection of disjoint embedded tori $T_1, T_2,\ldots,T_k\subset M$ such that each connected component of $M\setminus\bigcup_{i=1}^k T_i$ is a circle bundle over a surface.

Two very important classes of examples are given by the Seifert bundles and the Solv manifolds. This leads to a more modern definition: a graph manifold is either a Solv manifold, a manifold having only Seifert pieces in its JSJ decomposition, or connect sums of the previous two categories. From this perspective, Waldhausen's article can be seen as the first breakthrough towards the discovery of JSJ decomposition.

One of the numerous consequences of the Thurston-Perelman geometrization theorem is that graph manifolds are precisely the 3-manifolds whose Gromov norm vanishes.
