= Periphery =

Periphery or peripheral may refer to:

== Arts and entertainment ==
- Periphery (band), American progressive metal band
  - Periphery (album), 2010
- "Periphery", a song by Fiona Apple from the 2012 album The Idler Wheel...
- Periphery, a fictional entity in wargaming franchise BattleTech
- The Peripheral (novel), a 2014 novel by William Gibson
  - The Peripheral (TV series), loosely based on the novel

== Science and technology ==
- Peripheral, a computer auxiliary hardware device
- Boundary parallel, or peripheral, in mathematical manifold theory

== Other uses ==
- Periphery (France), a statistical area
- Regions of Greece (περιφέρειες, periféreies), administrative divisions

== See also ==
- Periphery countries, the least developed countries in world systems theory
- Peripheral cycle, in graph theory
- Peripherally selective drug, with a primary mechanism of action outside the central nervous system
- Peripheral nervous system, part of the nervous system of bilateral animals
- Peripheral unit (disambiguation)
- Peripheral vision, vision as it occurs outside the center of gaze
- Core–periphery structure, a network theory model.
