= SL2(R) =

Group of real 2×2 matrices with unit determinant

In mathematics, the special linear group SL(2, R) or SL_{2}(R) is the group of 2 × 2 real matrices with determinant one:

$$\mbox{SL}(2,\mathbf{R}) = \left\{ \begin{pmatrix}
a & b \\
c & d
\end{pmatrix} \colon a,b,c,d \in \mathbf{R}\mbox{ and }ad-bc=1\right\}.$$

It is a connected non-compact simple real Lie group of dimension 3 with applications in geometry, topology, representation theory, and physics.

SL(2, R) acts on the complex upper half-plane by fractional linear transformations. The group action factors through the quotient PSL(2, R) (the 2 × 2 projective special linear group over R). More specifically,

PSL(2, R) = SL(2, R) / {±I},

where I denotes the 2 × 2 identity matrix. It contains the modular group PSL(2, Z).

Also closely related is the 2-fold covering group, Mp(2, R), a metaplectic group (thinking of SL(2, R) as a symplectic group).

Another related group is SL^{±}(2, R), the group of real 2 × 2 matrices with determinant ±1; this is more commonly used in the context of the modular group, however.

== Descriptions ==
SL(2, R) is the group of all linear transformations of R^{2} that preserve oriented area. It is isomorphic to the symplectic group Sp(2, R) and the special unitary group SU(1, 1). It is also isomorphic to the group of unit-length coquaternions. The group SL^{±}(2, R) preserves unoriented area: it may reverse orientation.

The quotient PSL(2, R) has several interesting descriptions, up to Lie group isomorphism:

- It is the group of orientation-preserving projective transformations of the real projective line R ∪ {∞}.
- It is the group of conformal automorphisms of the unit disc.
- It is the group of orientation-preserving isometries of the hyperbolic plane.
- It is the restricted Lorentz group of three-dimensional Minkowski space. Equivalently, it is isomorphic to the indefinite orthogonal group SO^{+}(1,2). It follows that SL(2, R) is isomorphic to the spin group Spin(2,1)^{+}.

Elements of the modular group PSL(2, Z) have additional interpretations, as do elements of the group SL(2, Z) (as linear transforms of the torus), and these interpretations can also be viewed in light of the general theory of SL(2, R).

=== Homographies ===
Elements of PSL(2, R) are homographies on the real projective line R ∪ {∞}:

$$[x,1] \mapsto [x,\ 1] \begin{pmatrix}a & c \\ b & d \end{pmatrix} \ = \ [ax + b,\ cx + d] \ = \, \left[\frac{ax+b}{cx+d},\ 1\right] .$$

These projective transformations form a subgroup of PSL(2, C), which acts on the Riemann sphere by Möbius transformations.

When the real line is considered the boundary of the hyperbolic plane, PSL(2, R) expresses hyperbolic motions.

=== Möbius transformations ===
Elements of PSL(2, R) act on the complex plane by Möbius transformations:

$$z \mapsto \frac{az+b}{cz+d}\;\;\;\;\mbox{ (where }a,b,c,d\in\mathbf{R}\mbox{)}.$$

This is precisely the set of Möbius transformations that preserve the upper half-plane. It follows that PSL(2, R) is the group of conformal automorphisms of the upper half-plane. By the Riemann mapping theorem, it is also isomorphic to the group of conformal automorphisms of the unit disc.

These Möbius transformations act as the isometries of the upper half-plane model of hyperbolic space, and the corresponding Möbius transformations of the disc are the hyperbolic isometries of the Poincaré disk model.

The above formula can be also used to define Möbius transformations of dual and double (aka split-complex) numbers. The corresponding geometries are in non-trivial relations to Lobachevskian geometry.

=== Adjoint representation ===
The group SL(2, R) acts on its Lie algebra sl(2, R) by conjugation (remember that the Lie algebra elements are also 2 × 2 matrices), yielding a faithful 3-dimensional linear representation of PSL(2, R). This can alternatively be described as the action of PSL(2, R) on the space of quadratic forms on R^{2}. The result is the following representation:

$$\begin{bmatrix}
a & b \\
c & d
\end{bmatrix} \mapsto \begin{bmatrix}
a^2 & 2ab & b^2 \\
ac & ad+bc & bd \\
c^2 & 2cd & d^2
\end{bmatrix}.$$

The Killing form on sl(2, R) has signature (2,1), and induces an isomorphism between PSL(2, R) and the Lorentz group SO^{+}(2,1). This action of PSL(2, R) on Minkowski space restricts to the isometric action of PSL(2, R) on the hyperboloid model of the hyperbolic plane.

== Classification of elements ==
The eigenvalues of an element A ∈ SL(2, R) satisfy the characteristic polynomial

$$\lambda^2 \,-\, \mathrm{tr}(A)\,\lambda \,+\, 1 \,=\, 0$$

and therefore

$$\lambda = \frac{\mathrm{tr}(A) \pm \sqrt{\mathrm{tr}(A)^2 - 4}}{2}.$$

This leads to the following classification of elements, with corresponding action on the Euclidean plane:

- If $|\mathrm{tr}(A)| < 2$, then A is called elliptic, and is conjugate to a rotation.
- If $|\mathrm{tr}(A)| = 2$, then A is called parabolic, and is a shear mapping.
- If $|\mathrm{tr}(A)| > 2$, then A is called hyperbolic, and is a squeeze mapping.

The names correspond to the classification of conic sections by eccentricity: if one defines eccentricity as half the absolute value of the trace (ε = 1/2 |tr|; dividing by 2 corrects for the effect of dimension, while absolute value corresponds to ignoring an overall factor of ±1 such as when working in PSL(2, R)), then this yields: $\epsilon < 1$, elliptic; $\epsilon = 1$, parabolic; $\epsilon > 1$, hyperbolic.

The identity element 1 and negative identity element −1 (in PSL(2, R) they are the same), have trace ±2, and hence by this classification are parabolic elements, though they are often considered separately.

The same classification is used for SL(2, C) and PSL(2, C) (Möbius transformations) and PSL(2, R) (real Möbius transformations), with the addition of "loxodromic" transformations corresponding to complex traces; analogous classifications are used elsewhere.

A subgroup that is contained with the elliptic (respectively, parabolic, hyperbolic) elements, plus the identity and negative identity, is called an elliptic subgroup (respectively, parabolic subgroup, hyperbolic subgroup).

The trichotomy of SL(2, R) into elliptic, parabolic, and hyperbolic elements is a classification into subsets, not subgroups: these sets are not closed under multiplication (the product of two parabolic elements need not be parabolic, and so forth). However, each element is conjugate to a member of one of 3 standard one-parameter subgroups (possibly times ±1), as detailed below.

Topologically, as trace is a continuous map, the elliptic elements (excluding ±1) form an open set, as do the hyperbolic elements (excluding ±1). By contrast, the parabolic elements, together with ±1, form a closed set that is not open.

=== Elliptic elements ===
The eigenvalues for an elliptic element are both complex, and are conjugate values on the unit circle. Such an element is conjugate to a rotation of the Euclidean plane – they can be interpreted as rotations in a possibly non-orthogonal basis – and the corresponding element of PSL(2, R) acts as (conjugate to) a rotation of the hyperbolic plane and of Minkowski space.

Elliptic elements of the modular group must have eigenvalues {ω, ω^{−1}}, where ω is a primitive 3rd, 4th, or 6th root of unity. These are all the elements of the modular group with finite order, and they act on the torus as periodic diffeomorphisms.

Elements of trace 0 may be called "circular elements" (by analogy with eccentricity) but this is rarely done; they correspond to elements with eigenvalues ±i, and are conjugate to rotation by 90°, and square to -I: they are the non-identity involutions in PSL(2).

Elliptic elements are conjugate into the subgroup of rotations of the Euclidean plane, the special orthogonal group SO(2); the angle of rotation is arccos of half of the trace, with the sign of the rotation determined by orientation. (A rotation and its inverse are conjugate in GL(2) but not SL(2).)

=== Parabolic elements ===
A parabolic element has only a single eigenvalue, which is either 1 or -1. Such an element acts as a shear mapping on the Euclidean plane, and the corresponding element of PSL(2, R) acts as a limit rotation of the hyperbolic plane and as a null rotation of Minkowski space.

Parabolic elements of the modular group act as Dehn twists of the torus.

Parabolic elements are conjugate into the 2 component group of standard shears × ±I: $\left(\begin{smallmatrix}1 & \lambda \\ & 1\end{smallmatrix}\right) \times \{\pm I\}$. In fact, they are all conjugate (in SL(2)) to one of the four matrices $\left(\begin{smallmatrix}1 & \pm 1 \\ & 1\end{smallmatrix}\right)$, $\left(\begin{smallmatrix}-1 & \pm 1 \\ & -1\end{smallmatrix}\right)$ (in GL(2) or SL^{±}(2), the ± can be omitted, but in SL(2) it cannot).

=== Hyperbolic elements ===
The eigenvalues for a hyperbolic element are both real, and are reciprocals. Such an element acts as a squeeze mapping of the Euclidean plane, and the corresponding element of PSL(2, R) acts as a translation of the hyperbolic plane and as a Lorentz boost on Minkowski space.

Hyperbolic elements of the modular group act as Anosov diffeomorphisms of the torus.

Hyperbolic elements are conjugate into the 2 component group of standard squeezes × ±I: $\left(\begin{smallmatrix}\lambda \\ & \lambda^{-1}\end{smallmatrix}\right) \times \{\pm I\}$; the hyperbolic angle of the hyperbolic rotation is given by arcosh of half of the trace, but the sign can be positive or negative: in contrast to the elliptic case, a squeeze and its inverse are conjugate in SL₂ (by a rotation in the axes; for standard axes, a rotation by 90°).

=== Conjugacy classes ===
By Jordan normal form, matrices are classified up to conjugacy (in GL(n, C)) by eigenvalues and nilpotence (concretely, nilpotence means where 1s occur in the Jordan blocks). Thus elements of SL(2) are classified up to conjugacy in GL(2) (or indeed SL^{±}(2)) by trace (since determinant is fixed, and trace and determinant determine eigenvalues), except if the eigenvalues are equal, so ±I and the parabolic elements of trace +2 and trace -2 are not conjugate (the former have no off-diagonal entries in Jordan form, while the latter do).

Up to conjugacy in SL(2) (instead of GL(2)), there is an additional datum, corresponding to orientation: a clockwise and counterclockwise (elliptical) rotation are not conjugate, nor are a positive and negative shear, as detailed above; thus for absolute value of trace less than 2, there are two conjugacy classes for each trace (clockwise and counterclockwise rotations), for absolute value of the trace equal to 2 there are three conjugacy classes for each trace (positive shear, identity, negative shear), and for absolute value of the trace greater than 2 there is one conjugacy class for a given trace.

== Iwasawa or KAN decomposition ==
The Iwasawa decomposition of a group is a method to construct the group as a product of three Lie subgroups K, A, N. For $\mbox{SL}(2,\mathbf{R})$ these three subgroups are

$$\mathbf{K} = \left\{
\begin{pmatrix}
\cos \theta & -\sin \theta \\
\sin \theta & \cos \theta
\end{pmatrix} \in SL(2,\mathbb{R}) \ | \  \theta\in\mathbf{R}  \right\} \cong SO(2) ,$$
$$\mathbf{A} = \left\{
\begin{pmatrix}
r & 0 \\
0 & r^{-1}
\end{pmatrix} \in SL(2,\mathbb{R}) \ | \  r > 0  \right\},$$
$$\mathbf{N} = \left\{
\begin{pmatrix}
1 & x \\
0 & 1
\end{pmatrix} \in SL(2,\mathbb{R}) \ | \  x\in\mathbf{R} \right\}.$$

These three elements are the generators of the Elliptic, Hyperbolic, and Parabolic subsets respectively.

== Topology and universal cover ==
As a topological space, PSL(2, R) can be described as the unit tangent bundle of the hyperbolic plane. It is a circle bundle, and has a natural contact structure induced by the symplectic structure on the hyperbolic plane. SL(2, R) is a 2-fold cover of PSL(2, R), and can be thought of as the bundle of spinors on the hyperbolic plane.

The fundamental group of SL(2, R) is the infinite cyclic group Z. The universal covering group, denoted $\overline{\mbox{SL}(2,\mathbf{R})}$, is an example of a finite-dimensional Lie group that is not a matrix group. That is, $\overline{\mbox{SL}(2,\mathbf{R})}$ admits no faithful, finite-dimensional representation.

As a topological space, $\overline{\mbox{SL}(2,\mathbf{R})}$ is a line bundle over the hyperbolic plane. When imbued with a left-invariant metric, the 3-manifold $\overline{\mbox{SL}(2,\mathbf{R})}$ becomes one of the eight Thurston geometries. For example, $\overline{\mbox{SL}(2,\mathbf{R})}$ is the universal cover of the unit tangent bundle to any hyperbolic surface. Any manifold modeled on $\overline{\mbox{SL}(2,\mathbf{R})}$ is orientable, and is a circle bundle over some 2-dimensional hyperbolic orbifold (a Seifert fiber space).

The braid group B_{3} is the universal central extension of the modular group.

Under this covering, the preimage of the modular group PSL(2, Z) is the braid group on 3 generators, B_{3}, which is the universal central extension of the modular group. These are lattices inside the relevant algebraic groups, and this corresponds algebraically to the universal covering group in topology.

The 2-fold covering group can be identified as Mp(2, R), a metaplectic group, thinking of SL(2, R) as the symplectic group Sp(2, R).

The aforementioned groups together form a sequence:

$$\overline{\mathrm{SL}(2,\mathbf{R})} \to \cdots \to \mathrm{Mp}(2,\mathbf{R})
\to \mathrm{SL}(2,\mathbf{R}) \to \mathrm{PSL}(2,\mathbf{R}).$$

However, there are other covering groups of PSL(2, R) corresponding to all n, as n Z < Z ≅ π_{1} (PSL(2, R)), which form a lattice of covering groups by divisibility; these cover SL(2, R) if and only if n is even.

== Algebraic structure ==
The center of SL(2, R) is the two-element group {±1}, and the quotient PSL(2, R) is simple.

Discrete subgroups of PSL(2, R) are called Fuchsian groups. These are the hyperbolic analogue of the Euclidean wallpaper groups and Frieze groups. The most famous of these is the modular group PSL(2, Z), which acts on a tessellation of the hyperbolic plane by ideal triangles.

The circle group SO(2) is a maximal compact subgroup of SL(2, R), and the circle SO(2) / {±1} is a maximal compact subgroup of PSL(2, R).

The Schur multiplier of the discrete group PSL(2, R) is much larger than Z, and the universal central extension is much larger than the universal covering group. However these large central extensions do not take the topology into account and are somewhat pathological.

== Representation theory ==
SL(2, R) is a real, non-compact simple Lie group, and is the split-real form of the complex Lie group SL(2, C). The Lie algebra of SL(2, R), denoted sl(2, R), is the algebra of all real, traceless 2 × 2 matrices. It is the Bianchi algebra of type VIII.

The finite-dimensional representation theory of SL(2, R) is equivalent to the representation theory of SU(2), which is the compact real form of SL(2, C). In particular, SL(2, R) has no nontrivial finite-dimensional unitary representations. This is a feature of every connected simple non-compact Lie group. For outline of proof, see non-unitarity of representations.

The infinite-dimensional representation theory of SL(2, R) is quite interesting. The group has several families of unitary representations, which were worked out in detail by Gelfand and Naimark (1946), V. Bargmann (1947), and Harish-Chandra (1952).

== See also ==
- Linear group
- Special linear group
- Projective linear group
- Modular group
- SL(2, C) (Möbius transformations)
- Projective transformation
- Fuchsian group
- Table of Lie groups
- Anosov flow
