= Spherical space form conjecture =

- Field: Geometric topology
- Conjectured by: Heinz Hopf
- Conjectured in: 1926
- First proof by: Grigori Perelman
- First proof in: 2006
- Implied by: Geometrization conjecture
- Equivalent to: Poincaré conjecture Thurston elliptization conjecture

In geometric topology, the spherical space form conjecture (now a theorem) states that a finite group acting on the 3-sphere is conjugate to a group of isometries of the 3-sphere.

== History ==
The conjecture was posed by Heinz Hopf in 1926 after determining the fundamental groups of three-dimensional spherical space forms as a generalization of the Poincaré conjecture to the non-simply connected case.

== Status ==
The conjecture is implied by Thurston's geometrization conjecture, which was proven by Grigori Perelman in 2003. The conjecture was independently proven for groups whose actions have fixed points—this special case is known as the Smith conjecture. It is also proven for various groups acting without fixed points, such as cyclic groups whose orders are a power of two (George Livesay, Robert Myers) and cyclic groups of order 3 (J. Hyam Rubinstein).

== See also ==
- Killing–Hopf theorem
