= Bing double =

Operation on a knot producing a link with two components

The unknot (left) and its Bing double (right).

In knot theory, a field of mathematics, the Bing double of a knot is a link with two components which follow the pattern of the knot and "hook together". Bing doubles were introduced in Bing (1952) by their namesake, the American mathematician R. H. Bing. The Bing double of a slice knot is a slice link, though it is unknown whether the converse is true. The components of a Bing double bound disjoint Seifert surfaces.

A solid torus encasing the Bing double of the unknot.

The Bing double of a knot K is defined by placing the Bing double of the unknot in the solid torus surrounding it, as shown in the figure, and then twisting that solid torus into the shape of K. This definition is similar to that for Whitehead doubles. The Bing double of the unknot is also called the Bing link.

== See also ==
- Slice knot
- Seifert surface
- Satellite knot
- Whitehead double
