= Bianchi classification =

Lie algebra classification

In mathematics, the Bianchi classification provides a list of all real 3-dimensional Lie algebras (up to isomorphism). The classification contains 11 classes, 9 of which contain a single Lie algebra and two of which contain a continuum-sized family of Lie algebras. (Sometimes two of the groups are included in the infinite families, giving 9 instead of 11 classes.) The classification is important in geometry and physics, because the associated Lie groups serve as symmetry groups of 3-dimensional Riemannian manifolds. It is named for Luigi Bianchi, who worked it out in 1898.

The term "Bianchi classification" is also used for similar classifications in other dimensions and for classifications of complex Lie algebras.

== Classification in dimension less than 3 ==
- Dimension 0: The only Lie algebra is the abelian Lie algebra R^{0}.
- Dimension 1: The only Lie algebra is the abelian Lie algebra R^{1}, with outer automorphism group the multiplicative group of non-zero real numbers.
- Dimension 2: There are two Lie algebras:
  - (1) The abelian Lie algebra R^{2}, with outer automorphism group GL_{2}(R).
  - (2) The solvable Lie algebra of 2×2 upper triangular matrices of trace 0. It has trivial center and trivial outer automorphism group. The associated simply connected Lie group is the affine group of the line.

== Classification in dimension 3 ==
All the 3-dimensional Lie algebras other than types VIII and IX can be constructed as a semidirect product of R^{2} and R, with R acting on R^{2} by some 2 by 2 matrix M. The different types correspond to different types of matrices M, as described below.

- Type I: This is the abelian and unimodular Lie algebra R^{3}. The simply connected group has center R^{3} and outer automorphism group GL_{3}(R). This is the case when M is 0.
- Type II: The Heisenberg algebra, which is nilpotent and unimodular. The simply connected group has center R and outer automorphism group GL_{2}(R). This is the case when M is nilpotent but not 0 (eigenvalues all 0).
- Type III: This algebra is a product of R and the 2-dimensional non-abelian Lie algebra. (It is a limiting case of type VI, where one eigenvalue becomes zero.) It is solvable and not unimodular. The simply connected group has center R and outer automorphism group the group of non-zero real numbers. The matrix M has one zero and one non-zero eigenvalue.
- Type IV: The algebra generated by [y,z] = 0, [x,y] = y, [x, z] = y + z. It is solvable and not unimodular. The simply connected group has trivial center and outer automorphism group the product of the reals and a group of order 2. The matrix M has two equal non-zero eigenvalues, but is not diagonalizable.
- Type V: [y,z] = 0, [x,y] = y, [x, z] = z. Solvable and not unimodular. (A limiting case of type VI where both eigenvalues are equal.) The simply connected group has trivial center and outer automorphism group the elements of GL_{2}(R) of determinant +1 or −1. The matrix M has two equal eigenvalues, and is diagonalizable.
- Type VI: An infinite family: semidirect products of R^{2} by R, where the matrix M has non-zero distinct real eigenvalues with non-zero sum. The algebras are solvable and not unimodular. The simply connected group has trivial center and outer automorphism group a product of the non-zero real numbers and a group of order 2.
- Type VI_{0}: This Lie algebra is the semidirect product of R^{2} by R, with R where the matrix M has non-zero distinct real eigenvalues with zero sum. It is solvable and unimodular. It is the Lie algebra of the 2-dimensional Poincaré group, the group of isometries of 2-dimensional Minkowski space. The simply connected group has trivial center and outer automorphism group the product of the positive real numbers with the dihedral group of order 8.
- Type VII: An infinite family: semidirect products of R^{2} by R, where the matrix M has non-real and non-imaginary eigenvalues. Solvable and not unimodular. The simply connected group has trivial center and outer automorphism group the non-zero reals.
- Type VII_{0}: Semidirect product of R^{2} by R, where the matrix M has non-zero imaginary eigenvalues. Solvable and unimodular. This is the Lie algebra of the group of isometries of the plane. The simply connected group has center Z and outer automorphism group a product of the non-zero real numbers and a group of order 2.
- Type VIII: The Lie algebra sl_{2}(R) of traceless 2 by 2 matrices, associated to the group SL_{2}(R). It is simple and unimodular. The simply connected group is not a matrix group; it is denoted by $\overline{\mbox{SL}(2,\mathbf{R})}$, has center Z and its outer automorphism group has order 2.
- Type IX: The Lie algebra of the orthogonal group O_{3}(R). It is denoted by 𝖘𝖔(3) and is simple and unimodular. The corresponding simply connected group is SU(2); it has center of order 2 and trivial outer automorphism group, and is a spin group.

The classification of 3-dimensional complex Lie algebras is similar except that types VIII and IX become isomorphic, and types VI and VII both become part of a single family of Lie algebras.

The connected 3-dimensional Lie groups can be classified as follows: they are a quotient of the corresponding simply connected Lie group by a discrete subgroup of the center, so can be read off from the table above.

The groups are related to the 8 geometries of Thurston's geometrization conjecture. More precisely, seven of the 8 geometries can be realized as a left-invariant metric on the simply connected group (sometimes in more than one way). The Thurston geometry of type S^{2}×R cannot be realized in this way.

=== Structure constants ===
The three-dimensional Bianchi spaces each admit a set of three Killing vector fields $\xi^{(a)}_i$ which obey the following property:

$$\left( \frac{\partial \xi^{(c)}_i}{\partial x^k} - \frac{\partial \xi^{(c)}_k}{\partial x^i} \right) \xi^i_{(a)} \xi^k_{(b)} = C^c_{\ ab}$$

where $C^c_{\ ab}$, the "structure constants" of the group, form a constant order-three tensor antisymmetric in its lower two indices. For any three-dimensional Bianchi space, $C^c_{\ ab}$ is given by the relationship

$$C^c_{\ ab} = \varepsilon_{abd}n^{cd} - \delta^c_a a_b + \delta^c_b a_a$$

where $\varepsilon_{abd}$ is the Levi-Civita symbol, $\delta^c_a$ is the Kronecker delta, and the vector $a_a = (a,0,0)$ and diagonal tensor $n^{cd}$ are described by the following table, where $n^{(i)}$ gives the ith eigenvalue of $n^{cd}$; the parameter a runs over all positive real numbers:

Bianchi type	$a$	$n^{(1)}$	$n^{(2)}$	$n^{(3)}$	class	notes	graphical (Fig. 1)
I	0	0	0	0	A	describes Euclidean space	at the origin
II	0	1	0	0	A		interval [0,1] along $n^{(1)}$
III	1	0	1	-1	B	the subcase of type VI_{a} with $a = 1$	projects to fourth quadrant of the a = 0 plane
IV	1	0	0	1	B		vertical open face between first and fourth quadrants of the a = 0 plane
V	1	0	0	0	B	has a hyper-pseudosphere as a special case	the interval (0,1] along the axis a
VI_{0}	0	1	-1	0	A		fourth quadrant of the horizontal plane
VI_{a}	$a$	0	1	-1	B	when $a = 1$, equivalent to type III	projects to fourth quadrant of the a = 0 plane
VII_{0}	0	1	1	0	A	has Euclidean space as a special case	first quadrant of the horizontal plane
VII_{a}	$a$	0	1	1	B	has a hyper-pseudosphere as a special case	projects to first quadrant of the a = 0 plane
VIII	0	1	1	-1	A		sixth octant
IX	0	1	1	1	A	has a hypersphere as a special case	second octant

Figure 1. The parameter space as a 3-plane (class A) and an orthogonal half 3-plane (class B) in R^{4} with coordinates (n^{(1)}, n^{(2)}, n^{(3)}, a), showing the canonical representatives of each Bianchi type.

The standard Bianchi classification can be derived from the structural constants in the following six steps:

1. Due to the antisymmetry $C_{ab}^c = -C_{ba}^c$, there are nine independent constants $C_{ab}^c$. These can be equivalently represented by the nine components of an arbitrary constant matrix C^{ab}:
  $C_{ab}^c = \varepsilon_{abd} C^{dc},$
  where ε_{abd} is the totally antisymmetric three-dimensional Levi-Civita symbol (ε_{123} = 1). Substitution of this expression for $C_{ab}^c$ into the Jacobi identity, results in
  $\varepsilon_{abd} C^{bd} C^{ac} = 0.$
2. The structure constants can be transformed as:
  $C^{ab} = \left (\det{A} \right )^{-1} A_m^a A_n^b \acute{C}^{mn}.$
  Appearance of det A in this formula is due to the fact that the symbol ε_{abd} transforms as tensor density: $\varepsilon_{abc} = \left ( \det{A} \right ) D_a^m D_b^n D_c^d \acute{\varepsilon}_{mnd}$, where έ_{mnd} ≡ ε_{mnd}. By this transformation it is always possible to reduce the matrix C^{ab} to the form:
  $$C^{ab} = \begin{bmatrix}
n_1 & 0 & 0 \\
0 & C^{22} & C^{23} \\
0 & C^{32} & C^{33}
\end{bmatrix}.$$
  After such a choice, one still have the freedom of making triad transformations but with the restrictions $A_2^1 = A_3^1 = 0$ and $A_1^2 = A_1^3 = 0.$
3. Now, the Jacobi identities give only one constraint:
  $\left ( C^{23} - C^{32} \right ) n_1 = 0.$
4. If n_{1} ≠ 0 then C^{23} – C^{32} = 0 and by the remaining transformations with $A_{\bar{b}}^{\bar{a}} \neq 0 , \quad \bar{a},\bar{b} = \bar{2},\bar{3}$, the 2 × 2 matrix $C^{\bar{a} \bar{b}}$ in C^{ab} can be made diagonal. Then
  $$C^{ab} = \begin{bmatrix}
n_1 & 0 & 0 \\
0 & n_2 & 0 \\
0 & 0 & n_3
\end{bmatrix}.$$
  The diagonality condition for C^{ab} is preserved under the transformations with diagonal $A_b^a$. Under these transformations, the three parameters n_{1}, n_{2}, n_{3} change in the following way:
  $n_a = \left ( A_1^1 A_2^2 A_3^3 \right ) \left ( A_a^a \right )^2 \acute{n}_a, \text{no summation over} \ a.$
  By these diagonal transformations, the modulus of any n_{a} (if it is not zero) can be made equal to unity. Taking into account that the simultaneous change of sign of all n_{a} produce nothing new, one arrives to the following invariantly different sets for the numbers n_{1}, n_{2}, n_{3} (invariantly different in the sense that there is no way to pass from one to another by some transformation of the triad $e_a^{\bar{a}} = A_{\bar{b}}^{\bar{a}} e_a^{\bar{b}}$), that is to the following different types of homogeneous spaces with diagonal matrix C^{ab}:
  $$\begin{matrix}
Bianchi \ IX & : & (n_1, n_2, n_3) & = & (1, 1, 1), \\
Bianchi \ VIII & : & (n_1, n_2, n_3) & = & (1, 1, -1), \\
Bianchi \ VII_0 & : & (n_1, n_2, n_3) & = & (1, 1, 0), \\
Bianchi \ VI_0 & : & (n_1, n_2, n_3) & = & (1, -1, 0), \\
Bianchi \ II & : & (n_1, n_2, n_3) & = & (1, 0, 0).
\end{matrix}$$
5. Consider now the case n_{1} = 0. It can also happen in that case that C^{23} – C^{32} = 0. This returns to the situation already analyzed in the previous step but with the additional condition n_{1} = 0. Now, all essentially different types for the sets n_{1}, n_{2}, n_{3} are (0, 1, 1), (0, 1, −1), (0, 0, 1) and (0, 0, 0). The first three repeat the types VII_{0}, VI_{0}, II. Consequently, only one new type arises:
  $Bianchi \ I \ : \ (n_1 , n_2 , n_3) \ = \ (0, 0, 0).$
6. The only case left is n_{1} = 0 and C^{23} – C^{32} ≠ 0. Now the 2 × 2 matrix $C^{\bar{a} \bar{b}} ( \bar{a}, \bar{b} = 2, 3)$ is non-symmetric and it cannot be made diagonal by transformations using $A_{\bar{b}}^{\bar{a}} \neq 0$. However, its symmetric part can be diagonalized, that is the 3 × 3 matrix C^{ab} can be reduced to the form:
  $$C^{ab} = \begin{bmatrix}
0 & 0 & 0 \\
0 & n_2 & a \\
0 & -a & n_3
\end{bmatrix},$$
  where a is an arbitrary number. After this is done, there still remains the possibility to perform transformations with diagonal $A_{\bar{b}}^{\bar{a}}$, under which the quantities n_{2}, n_{3} and a change as follows:
  $n_2 = \left ( A_1^1 A_2^2 A_3^3 \right )^{-1} \left ( A_2^2 \right )^2 \acute{n}_2, \quad n_3 = \left ( A_1^1 A_2^2 A_3^3 \right )^{-1} \left ( A_3^3 \right )^2 \acute{n}_3, \quad a = \left ( A_1^1 \right )^{-1} \acute{a}.$
  These formulas show that for nonzero n_{2}, n_{3}, a, the combination a^{2}(n_{2}n_{3})^{−1} is an invariant quantity. By a choice of $A_1^1$, one can impose the condition a > 0 and after this is done, the choice of the sign of $A_3^3 \left ( A_2^2 \right )^{-1}$ permits one to change both signs of n_{2} and n_{3} simultaneously, that is the set (n_{2} , n_{3}) is equivalent to the set (−n_{2},−n_{3}). It follows that there are the following four different possibilities:
  $(a, n_2, n_3 ) = (a, 0, 0), (a, 0, 1), (a, 1, 1), (a, 1,-1).$
  For the first two, the number a can be transformed to unity by a choice of
  the parameters $A_1^1$ and $A_3^3 \left ( A_2^2 \right )^{-1}$. For the second two possibilities, both of these parameters are already fixed and a remains an invariant and arbitrary positive number. Historically these four types of homogeneous spaces have been classified as:
  $$\begin{matrix}
Bianchi \ V & : & n_1 = 0, \ (a, n_2, n_3) & = & (1, 0, 0), \\
Bianchi \ IV & : & n_1 = 0, \ (a, n_2, n_3) & = & (1, 0, 1), \\
Bianchi \ VII & : & n_1 = 0, \ (a, n_2, n_3) & = & (a, 1, 1), \\
Bianchi \ III & : & n_1 = 0, \ (a, n_2, n_3) & = & (1, 1, -1), \\
Bianchi \ VI & : & n_1 = 0, \ (a, n_2, n_3) & = & (a, 1, -1).
\end{matrix}$$
  Type III is just a particular case of type VI corresponding to a = 1. Types VII and VI contain an infinity of invariantly different types of algebras corresponding to the arbitrariness of the continuous parameter a. Type VII_{0} is a particular case of VII corresponding to a = 0 while type VI_{0} is a particular case of VI corresponding also to a = 0.

=== Curvature of Bianchi spaces ===
The Bianchi spaces have the property that their Ricci tensors can be separated into a product of the basis vectors associated with the space and a coordinate-independent tensor.

For a given metric:

$$ds^2 = \gamma_{ab} \xi^{(a)}_i \xi^{(b)}_k dx^i dx^k$$

(where $\xi^{(a)}_idx^i$ are 1-forms), the Ricci curvature tensor $R_{ik}$ is given by:

$$R_{ik} = R_{(a)(b)} \xi^{(a)}_i \xi^{(b)}_k$$

$$R_{(a)(b)} = \frac{1}{2} \left[ C^{cd}_{\ \ b} \left( C_{cda} + C_{dca} \right) + C^c_{\  cd} \left( C^{\ \ d}_{ab} + C^{\ \ d}_{ba} \right) - \frac{1}{2} C^{\ cd}_b C_{acd} \right]$$

where the indices on the structure constants are raised and lowered with $\gamma_{ab}$ which is not a function of $x^i$.

== Cosmological application ==
In cosmology, this classification is used for a homogeneous spacetime of dimension 3+1. The 3-dimensional Lie group is as the symmetry group of the 3-dimensional spacelike slice, and the Lorentz metric satisfying the Einstein equation is generated by varying the metric components as a function of t. The Friedmann–Lemaître–Robertson–Walker metrics are isotropic, which are particular cases of types I, V, $\scriptstyle\text{VII}_h$ and IX. The Bianchi type I models include the Kasner metric as a special case. The Bianchi IX cosmologies include the Taub metric. However, the dynamics near the singularity is approximately governed by a series of successive Kasner (Bianchi I) periods. The complicated dynamics, which essentially amounts to billiard motion in a portion of hyperbolic space, exhibits chaotic behaviour, and is named Mixmaster; its analysis is referred to as the BKL analysis after Belinskii, Khalatnikov and Lifshitz. More recent work has established a relation of (super-)gravity theories near a spacelike singularity (BKL-limit) with Lorentzian Kac–Moody algebras, Weyl groups and hyperbolic Coxeter groups. Other more recent work is concerned with the discrete nature of the Kasner map and a continuous generalisation. In a space that is both homogeneous and isotropic the metric is determined completely, leaving free only the sign of the curvature. Assuming only space homogeneity with no additional symmetry such as isotropy leaves considerably more freedom in choosing the metric. The following pertains to the space part of the metric at a given instant of time t assuming a synchronous frame so that t is the same synchronised time for the whole space.

Homogeneity implies identical metric properties at all points of the space. An exact definition of this concept involves considering sets of coordinate transformations that transform the space into itself, i.e. leave its metric unchanged: if the line element before transformation is

$$dl^2 = \gamma_{\alpha \beta} \left ( x^1, x^2, x^3 \right ) dx^{\alpha} dx^{\beta},$$

then after transformation the same line element is

$$dl^2 = \gamma_{\alpha \beta} \left ( x^{\prime 1}, x^{\prime 2}, x^{\prime 3} \right ) dx^{\prime \alpha} dx^{\prime \beta},$$

with the same functional dependence of γ_{αβ} on the new coordinates. (For a more theoretical and coordinate-independent definition of homogeneous space see homogeneous space). A space is homogeneous if it admits a set of transformations (a group of motions) that brings any given point to the position of any other point. Since space is three-dimensional the different transformations of the group are labelled by three independent parameters.

Figure 2. The triad e^{(a)} (e^{(1)}, e^{(2)}, e^{(3)}) is an affine coordinate system (including as a special case Cartesian coordinate system) whose coordinates are functions of the curvilinear coordinates x_{α} (x_{1}, x_{2}, x_{3}).

In Euclidean space the homogeneity of space is expressed by the invariance of the metric under parallel displacements (translations) of the Cartesian coordinate system. Each translation is determined by three parameters — the components of the displacement vector of the coordinate origin. All these transformations leave invariant the three independent differentials (dx, dy, dz) from which the line element is constructed. In the general case of a non-Euclidean homogeneous space, the transformations of its group of motions again leave invariant three independent linear differential forms, which do not, however, reduce to total differentials of any coordinate functions. These forms are written as $e_{\alpha}^{(a)} dx^{\alpha}$ where the Latin index (a) labels three independent vectors (coordinate functions); these vectors are called a frame field or triad. The Greek letters label the three space-like curvilinear coordinates. A spatial metric invariant is constructed under the given group of motions with the use of the above forms:

$dl^2 = \eta_{ab} \left ( e_{\alpha}^{(a)} dx^{\alpha} \right ) \left ( e_{\beta}^{(b)} dx^{\beta} \right )$	eq. 6a

i.e. the metric tensor is

$\gamma_{\alpha \beta} = \eta_{ab} e_{\alpha}^{(a)} e_{\beta}^{(b)}$	eq. 6b

where the coefficients η_{ab}, which are symmetric in the indices a and b, are functions of time. The choice of basis vectors is dictated by the symmetry properties of the space and, in general, these basis vectors are not orthogonal (so that the matrix η_{ab} is not diagonal).

The reciprocal triple of vectors $e_{(a)}^{\alpha}$ is introduced with the help of Kronecker delta

$e_{(a)}^{\alpha} e_{\alpha}^{(b)} = \delta_a^b; \quad e_{(a)}^{\alpha} e_{\beta}^{(a)} = \delta_{\alpha}^{\beta}$	eq. 6c

In the three-dimensional case, the relation between the two vector triples can be written explicitly

$\mathbf{e}_{(1)} = \frac{1}{v} \mathbf{e}^{(2)} \times \mathbf{e}^{(3)}, \quad \mathbf{e}_{(2)} = \frac{1}{v} \mathbf{e}^{(3)} \times \mathbf{e}^{(1)}, \quad \mathbf{e}_{(3)} = \frac{1}{v} \mathbf{e}^{(1)} \times \mathbf{e}^{(2)},$	eq. 6d

where the volume v is

$$v = \left\vert e_{\alpha}^{(a)} \right\vert = \mathbf{e}^{(1)} \cdot \mathbf{e}^{(2)} \times \mathbf{e}^{(3)},$$

with e_{(a)} and e^{(a)} regarded as Cartesian vectors with components $e_{(a)}^{\alpha}$ and $e_{\alpha}^{(a)}$, respectively. The determinant of the metric tensor eq. 6b is γ = ηv^{2} where η is the determinant of the matrix η_{ab}.

The required conditions for the homogeneity of the space are

$\left ( \frac{\partial e_{\alpha}^{(c)}}{\partial x^{\beta}} - \frac{\partial e_{\beta}^{(c)}}{\partial x^{\alpha}} \right ) e_{(a)}^{\alpha} e_{(b)}^{\beta} = C^{c}_{ab}.$	eq. 6e

The constants $C^{c}_{ab}$ are called the structure constants of the group.

Proof of eq. 6e
The invariance of the differential forms $e_{\alpha}^{(a)} dx^{\alpha}$ means that

$$e_{\alpha}^{(a)} (x) dx^{\alpha} = e_{\alpha}^{(a)} (x^{\prime}) dx^{\prime\alpha}$$

where the $e_{\alpha}^{(a)}$ on the two sides of the equation are the same functions of the old and new coordinates, respectively. Multiplying this equation by $e_{(a)}^{\beta}(x^{\prime})$, setting $dx^{\prime\beta} = \frac{\partial x^{\prime\beta}}{\partial x^{\alpha}} dx^{\alpha},$ and comparing coefficients of the same differentials dx^{α}, one finds

$$\frac{\partial x^{\prime\beta}}{\partial x^{\alpha}} = e_{(a)}^{\beta}(x^{\prime}) e_{\alpha}^{(a)}(x).$$

These equations are a system of differential equations that determine the functions $x^{\prime\beta}(x)$ for a given frame. In order to be integrable, these equations must satisfy identically the conditions

$$\frac{\partial^2 x^{\prime\beta}}{\partial x^{\alpha} \partial x^{\gamma}} = \frac{\partial^2 x^{\prime\beta}}{\partial x^{\gamma} \partial x^{\alpha}}.$$

Calculating the derivatives, one finds

$$\left [ \frac{\partial e_{(a)}^{\beta}(x^{\prime})}{\partial x^{\prime\delta}}e_{(b)}^{\delta}(x^{\prime}) - \frac{\partial e_{(b)}^{\beta}(x^{\prime})}{\partial x^{\prime\delta}}e_{(a)}^{\delta}(x^{\prime}) \right ] e_{\gamma}^{(b)}(x) e_{\alpha}^{(a)}(x) = e_{(a)}^{\beta}(x^{\prime}) \left [ \frac{\partial e_{\gamma}^{(a)}(x)}{\partial x^{\alpha}} - \frac{\partial e_{\alpha}^{(a)}(x)}{\partial x^{\gamma}} \right ].$$

Multiplying both sides of the equations by $e_{(d)}^{\alpha}(x)e_{(c)}^{\gamma}(x)e_{\beta}^{(f)}(x^{\prime})$ and shifting the differentiation from one factor to the other by using eq. 6c, one gets for the left side:

$$e_{\beta}^{(f)}(x^{\prime}) \left [ \frac{\partial e_{(d)}^{\beta}(x^{\prime})}{\partial x^{\prime\delta}}e_{(c)}^{\delta}(x^{\prime}) - \frac{\partial e_{(c)}^{\beta}(x^{\prime})}{\partial x^{\prime\delta}}e_{(d)}^{\delta}(x^{\prime}) \right ] = e_{(c)}^{\beta}(x^{\prime}) e_{(d)}^{\delta}(x^{\prime}) \left [ \frac{\partial e_{\beta}^{(f)}(x^{\prime})}{\partial x^{\prime\delta}} - \frac{\partial e_{\delta}^{(f)}(x^{\prime})}{\partial x^{\prime\beta}} \right ].$$

and for the right, the same expression in the variable x. Since x and x' are arbitrary, these expression must reduce to constants to obtain eq. 6e.

Multiplying by $e_{(c)}^{\gamma}$, eq. 6e can be rewritten in the form

$e_{(a)}^{\alpha} \frac{\partial e_{(b)}^{\gamma}}{\partial x^{\alpha}} - e_{(b)}^{\beta} \frac{\partial e_{(a)}^{\gamma}}{\partial x^{\beta}} = C_{ab}^c e_{(c)}^{\gamma}.$	eq. 6f

Equation 6e can be written in a vector form as

$$\mathbf{e}_{(a)} \times \mathbf{e}_{(b)} \text{curl } \mathbf{e}^{(c)} = -C_{ab}^c,$$

where again the vector operations are done as if the coordinates x^{α} were Cartesian. Using eq. 6d, one obtains

$\frac{1}{v} \left ( \mathbf{e}^{(1)} \text{curl } \mathbf{e}^{(1)} \right ) = C_{32}^1, \quad \frac{1}{v} \left ( \mathbf{e}^{(2)} \text{curl } \mathbf{e}^{(1)} \right ) = C_{13}^1, \quad \frac{1}{v} \left ( \mathbf{e}^{(3)} \text{curl } \mathbf{e}^{(1)} \right ) = C_{21}^1$	eq. 6g

and six more equations obtained by a cyclic permutation of indices 1, 2, 3.

The structure constants are antisymmetric in their lower indices as seen from their definition eq. 6e: $C_{ab}^c = -C_{ba}^c$. Another condition on the structure constants can be obtained by noting that eq. 6f can be written in the form of commutation relations

$\left [ X_a, X_b \right ] \equiv X_a X_b - X_b X_a = C_{ab}^c X_c$	eq. 6h

for the linear differential operators

$X_a = e_{(a)}^{\alpha} \frac{\partial}{\partial x^{\alpha}}$	eq. 6i

In the mathematical theory of continuous groups (Lie groups) the operators X_{a} satisfying conditions eq. 6h are called the generators of the group. The theory of Lie groups uses operators defined using the Killing vectors $\xi_{(a)}^{\alpha}$ instead of triads $e_{(a)}^{\alpha}$. Since in the synchronous metric none of the γ_{αβ} components depends on time, the Killing vectors (triads) are time-like.

The conditions eq. 6h follow from the Jacobi identity

$$[[X_a, X_b], X_c] + [[X_b, X_c], X_a] + [[X_c, X_a], X_b] = 0$$

and have the form

$C_{ab}^e C_{ec}^d + C_{bc}^e C_{ea}^d + C_{ca}^e C_{eb}^d = 0$	eq. 6j

It is a definite advantage to use, in place of the three-index constants $C_{ab}^c$, a set of two-index quantities, obtained by the dual transformation

$C_{ab}^c = e_{abd} C^{dc}$	eq. 6k

where e_{abc} = e^{abc} is the unit antisymmetric symbol (with e_{123} = +1). With these constants the commutation relations eq. 6h are written as

$e^{abc} X_b X_c = C^{ad} X_d$	eq. 6l

The antisymmetry property is already taken into account in the definition eq. 6k, while property eq. 6j takes the form

$e_{bcd} C^{cd} C^{ba} = 0$	eq. 6m

The choice of the three frame vectors in the differential forms $e_{\alpha}^{(a)} dx^{\alpha}$ (and with them the operators X_{a}) is not unique. They can be subjected to any linear transformation with constant coefficients:

$\mathbf{e}_{(a)} = A_a^b \mathbf{e}_{(b)}.$	eq. 6n

The quantities η_{ab} and C^{ab} behave like tensors (are invariant) with respect to such transformations.

The conditions eq. 6m are the only ones that the structure constants must satisfy. But among the constants admissible by these conditions, there are equivalent sets, in the sense that their difference is related to a transformation of the type eq. 6n. The question of the classification of homogeneous spaces reduces to determining all nonequivalent sets of structure constants. This can be done, using the "tensor" properties of the quantities C^{ab}, by the following simple method (C. G. Behr, 1962).

The asymmetric tensor C^{ab} can be resolved into a symmetric and an antisymmetric part. The first is denoted by n^{ab}, and the second is expressed in terms of its dual vector a_{c}:

$C^{ab} = n^{ab} + e^{abc} a_c.$	eq. 6o

Substitution of this expression in eq. 6m leads to the condition

$n^{ab} a_b = 0.$	eq. 6p

By means of the transformations eq. 6n the symmetric tensor n^{ab} can be brought to diagonal form with eigenvalues n_{1}, n_{2}, n_{3}. Equation 6p shows that the vector a_{b} (if it exists) lies along one of the principal directions of the tensor n^{ab}, the one corresponding to the eigenvalue zero. Without loss of generality one can therefore set a_{b} = (a, 0, 0). Then eq. 6p reduces to an_{1} = 0, i.e. one of the quantities a or n_{1} must be zero. The Jacobi identities take the form:

$[ X_1, X_2] = -a X_2 + n_3 X_3, \quad [X_2, X_3] = n_1 X_1, \quad [X_3, X_1] = n_2 X_2 + a X_3.$	eq. 6q

The only remaining freedoms are sign changes of the operators X_{a} and their multiplication by arbitrary constants. This permits to simultaneously change the sign of all the n_{a} and also to make the quantity a positive (if it is different from zero). Also all structure constants can be made equal to ±1, if at least one of the quantities a, n_{2}, n_{3} vanishes. But if all three of these quantities differ from zero, the scale transformations leave invariant the ratio h = a^{2}(n_{2}n_{3})^{−1}.

Thus one arrives at the Bianchi classification listing the possible types of homogeneous spaces classified by the values of a, n_{1}, n_{2}, n_{3} which is graphically presented in Fig. 3. In the class A case (a = 0), type IX (n^{(1)}=1, n^{(2)}=1, n^{(3)}=1) is represented by octant 2, type VIII (n^{(1)}=1, n^{(2)}=1, n^{(3)}=–1) is represented by octant 6, while type VII_{0} (n^{(1)}=1, n^{(2)}=1, n^{(3)}=0) is represented by the first quadrant of the horizontal plane and type VI_{0} (n^{(1)}=1, n^{(2)}=–1, n^{(3)}=0) is represented by the fourth quadrant of this plane; type II ((n^{(1)}=1, n^{(2)}=0, n^{(3)}=0) is represented by the interval [0,1] along n^{(1)} and type I (n^{(1)}=0, n^{(2)}=0, n^{(3)}=0) is at the origin. Similarly in the class B case (with n^{(3)} = 0), Bianchi type VI_{h} (a=h, n^{(1)}=1, n^{(2)}=–1) projects to the fourth quadrant of the horizontal plane and type VII_{h} (a=h, n^{(1)}=1, n^{(2)}=1) projects to the first quadrant of the horizontal plane; these last two types are a single isomorphism class corresponding to a constant value surface of the function h = a^{2}(n^{(1)}n^{(2)})^{−1}. A typical such surface is illustrated in one octant, the angle θ given by tan θ = |h/2|^{1/2}; those in the remaining octants are obtained by rotation through multiples of π/2, h alternating in sign for a given magnitude |h|. Type III is a subtype of VI_{h} with a=1. Type V (a=1, n^{(1)}=0, n^{(2)}=0) is the interval (0,1] along the axis a and type IV (a=1, n^{(1)}=1, n^{(2)}=0) is the vertical open face between the first and fourth quadrants of the a = 0 plane with the latter giving the class A limit of each type.

The Einstein equations for a universe with a homogeneous space can reduce to a system of ordinary differential equations containing only functions of time with the help of a frame field. To do this one must resolve the spatial components of four-vectors and four-tensors along the triad of basis vectors of the space:

$R_{(a)(b)} = R_{\alpha \beta} e_{(a)}^{\alpha} e_{(b)}^{\beta}, \quad R_{0(a)} = R_{0 \alpha} e_{(a)}^{\alpha}, \quad u^{(a)} = u^{\alpha} e_{\alpha}^{(a)},$

where all these quantities are now functions of t alone; the scalar quantities, the energy density ε and the pressure of the matter p, are also functions of the time.

The Einstein equations in vacuum in synchronous reference frame are (Note: The convention used by BKL is the same as in the Landau & Lifshitz (1988) book. The Latin indices run through the values 0, 1, 2, 3; Greek indices run through the space values 1, 2, 3. The metric g_{ik} has the signature (+ − − −); γ_{αβ} = −g_{αβ} is the 3-dimensional space metric tensor. BKL use a system of units, in which the speed of light and the Einstein gravitational constant are equal to 1.)

$R_0^0=-\frac{1}{2}\frac{\partial \varkappa_{\alpha}^{\alpha}}{\partial t}-\frac{1}{4} \varkappa_{\alpha}^{\beta} \varkappa_{\beta}^{\alpha}=0,$	eq. 11

$R_{\alpha}^{\beta}=-\frac{1}{2\sqrt{-g}} \frac{\partial}{\partial t} \left (\sqrt{-g} \varkappa_{\alpha}^{\beta} \right )-P_{\alpha}^{\beta}=0,$	eq. 12

$R_{\alpha}^{0}=\frac{1}{2} \left (\varkappa_{\alpha;\beta}^{\beta}- \varkappa_{\beta;\alpha}^{\beta}\right )=0,$	eq. 13

where $\varkappa_{\alpha}^{\beta}$ is the 3-dimensional tensor $\varkappa_{\alpha}^{\beta}=\frac{\partial \gamma_{\alpha}^{\beta}}{\partial t}$, and P_{αβ} is the 3-dimensional Ricci tensor, which is expressed by the 3-dimensional metric tensor γ_{αβ} in the same way as R_{ik} is expressed by g_{ik}; P_{αβ} contains only the space (but not the time) derivatives of γ_{αβ}. Using triads, for eq. 11 one has simply

$$\varkappa_{(a)(b)} = \frac{\partial \eta_{ab}}{\partial t}, \quad \varkappa_{(a)}^{(b)} = \frac{\partial \eta_{ac}}{\partial t} \eta^{cb}.$$

The components of P_{(a)(b)} can be expressed in terms of the quantities η_{ab} and the structure constants of the group by using the tetrad representation of the Ricci tensor in terms of quantities $\lambda_{abc} = \left ( e_{(a) i, k} - e_{(a) k, i} \right ) e_{(b)}^i e_{(c)}^k$

$$R_{(a)(b)} = -\frac{1}{2} \left ( \lambda_{ab,c}^c + \lambda_{ba,c}^c + \lambda_{ca,b}^c + \lambda_{cb,a}^c + \lambda^{cd}_b \lambda_{cda} + \lambda^{cd}_b \lambda_{dca} -
\frac{1}{2} \lambda_b^{cd} \lambda_{acd} + \lambda_{cd}^c \lambda_{ab}^d + \lambda_{cd}^c \lambda_{ba}^d \right ).$$

After replacing the three-index symbols $\lambda_{bc}^a = C_{bc}^a$ by two-index symbols C^{ab} and the transformations:

$$\eta_{ad} \eta_{bc} \eta_{cf} e^{def} = \eta e_{abc}, \quad e_{abf} e^{cdf} = \delta_a^c \delta_b^d - \delta_a^d \delta_b^c$$

one gets the "homogeneous" Ricci tensor expressed in structure constants:

$$P_{(a)}^{(b)} = \frac{1}{2 \eta} \left \{ 2 C^{bd} C_{ad} + C^{db} C_{ad} + C^{bd} C_{da} - C^d_d \left ( C^b_a + C_a^b \right ) + \delta_a^b \left [ \left ( C^d_d \right )^2 - 2 C^{df} C_{df} \right ] \right \}.$$

Here, all indices are raised and lowered with the local metric tensor η_{ab}

$$C_a^b = \eta_{ac} C^{cb}, \quad C_{ab} = \eta_{ac} \eta_{bd} C^{cd}.$$

The Bianchi identities for the three-dimensional tensor P_{αβ} in the homogeneous space take the form

$$P^c_b C^b_{ca} + P^c_a C^b_{cb} = 0.$$

Taking into account the transformations of covariant derivatives for arbitrary four-vectors A_{i} and four-tensors A_{ik}

$$A_{i;k} e_{(a)}^i e_{(b)}^k = A_{(a)(b)} - A^{(d)} \gamma_{dab},$$
$$A_{ik;l} e_{(a)}^i e_{(b)}^k e_{(c)}^l = A_{(a)(b)(c)} - A_{(b)}^{(d)} \gamma_{dac} + A_{(a)}^{(d)} \gamma_{dbc},$$

the final expressions for the triad components of the Ricci four-tensor are:

$R_0^0=-\frac{1}{2}\frac{\partial \varkappa_{(a)}^{(a)}}{\partial t}-\frac{1}{4} \varkappa_{(a)}^{(b)} \varkappa_{(b)}^{(a)},$	eq. 11a

$R_{(a)}^{(b)}=-\frac{1}{2\sqrt{\eta}} \frac{\partial}{\partial t} \left (\sqrt{\eta} \varkappa_{(a)}^{(b)} \right )- P_{(a)}^{(b)},$	eq. 12a

$R_{(a)}^{0}= -\frac{1}{2} \varkappa_{(b)}^{(c)} \left ( C_{ca}^b - \delta_a^b C_{dc}^d \right ).$	eq. 13a

In setting up the Einstein equations there is thus no need to use explicit expressions for the basis vectors as functions of the coordinates.

== See also ==
- Table of Lie groups
- List of simple Lie groups
- BKL singularity

== Bibliography ==
- Belinsky, Vladimir A.; Khalatnikov, I.M.; Lifshitz, E.M. (1971). "The oscillatory mode of approach to a singularity in homogeneous cosmological models with rotating axes". JETP. 60 (6): 1969–1979.
- Belinsky, Vladimir A.; Khalatnikov, I.M.; Lifshitz, E.M. (1972). "Construction of a general cosmological solution of the Einstein equation with a time singularity". JETP. 62 (5): 1606–1613.
- L. Bianchi, Sugli spazi a tre dimensioni che ammettono un gruppo continuo di movimenti. (On the spaces of three dimensions that admit a continuous group of movements.) Soc. Ital. Sci. Mem. di Mat. 11, 267 (1898) English translation Archived 2020-02-18 at the Wayback Machine
- Cornish, N.J.; Levin, J.J. (1997a). "The Mixmaster Universe is unambiguously chaotic". In Piran, Tsvi; Ruffini, Remo (eds.). On Recent Developments on Theoretical and Experimental General Relativity, Gravitation and Relativistic Field Theories. Proceedings from the Eight Marcel Grossman Meeting. The Hebrew University of Jerusalem: World Scientific. pp. 616–618. ISBN 978-9810237936. OL 13168102M.
- Cornish, Neil J.; Levin, Janna J. (1997b). "The Mixmaster Universe is Chaotic". Physical Review Letters. 78 (6): 998–1001. arXiv:gr-qc/9605029. Bibcode:1997PhRvL..78..998C. doi:10.1103/physrevlett.78.998. ISSN 0031-9007. S2CID 119476182.
- Cornish, Neil J.; Levin, Janna J. (1997c). "Mixmaster universe: A chaotic Farey tale". Physical Review D. 55 (12). American Physical Society (APS): 7489–7510. arXiv:gr-qc/9612066. Bibcode:1997PhRvD..55.7489C. doi:10.1103/physrevd.55.7489. ISSN 0556-2821. S2CID 17085583.
- Ferrando, J. J.; Saez, J. A. (2020). "Homogeneous three-dimensional Riemannian spaces". Classical and Quantum Gravity. 37 (18): 185011. arXiv:2004.01877. Bibcode:2020CQGra..37r5011F. doi:10.1088/1361-6382/ab9880. S2CID 214802205.
- Guido Fubini Sugli spazi a quattro dimensioni che ammettono un gruppo continuo di movimenti, (On the spaces of four dimensions that admit a continuous group of movements.) Ann. Mat. pura appli. (3) 9, 33-90 (1904); reprinted in Opere Scelte, a cura dell'Unione matematica italiana e col contributo del Consiglio nazionale delle ricerche, Roma Edizioni Cremonese, 1957–62
- MacCallum, On the classification of the real four-dimensional Lie algebras, in "On Einstein's path: essays in honor of Engelbert Schucking" edited by A. L. Harvey, Springer ISBN 0-387-98564-6
- Henneaux, Marc; Persson, Daniel; Spindel, Philippe (2008). "Spacelike Singularities and Hidden Symmetries of Gravity". Living Reviews in Relativity. 11 (1): 1. arXiv:0710.1818. Bibcode:2008LRR....11....1H. doi:10.12942/lrr-2008-1. PMC 5255974. PMID 28179821.
- Henneaux, Marc; Persson, Daniel; Wesley, Daniel (2008). "Coxeter group structure of cosmological billiards on compact spatial manifolds". Journal of High Energy Physics. 2008 (9): 052. arXiv:0805.3793. Bibcode:2008JHEP...09..052H. doi:10.1088/1126-6708/2008/09/052. ISSN 1029-8479. S2CID 14135098.
- Henneaux, Marc (2009). "Kac-Moody algebras and the structure of cosmological singularities: A new light on the Belinskii-Khalatnikov-Lifshitz analysis". Quantum Mechanics of Fundamental Systems: The Quest for Beauty and Simplicity. pp. 1–11. arXiv:0806.4670. doi:10.1007/978-0-387-87499-9_11. ISBN 978-0-387-87498-2. S2CID 18809715.
- Robert T. Jantzen, Bianchi classification of 3-geometries: original papers in translation
- Jantzen, Robert T. (2001). "Spatially homogeneous dynamics: a unified picture". Proc. Int. SCH. Phys. "E. Fermi" Course. LXXXVI. arXiv:gr-qc/0102035.
- Landau, Lev D.; Lifshitz, Evgeny M. (1988). Classical Theory of Fields (7th ed.). Moscow: Nauka. ISBN 978-5-02-014420-0. Vol. 2 of the Course of Theoretical Physics
- Lifshitz, Evgeny M.; Khalatnikov, Isaak M. (1963). "Проблемы релятивистской космологии". Uspekhi Fizicheskikh Nauk. 80 (7): 391–438. doi:10.3367/UFNr.0080.196307d.0391.; English translation in Lifshitz, E.M.; Khalatnikov, I.M. (1963). "Problems in the Relativistic Cosmology". Advances in Physics. 12 (46): 185. Bibcode:1963AdPhy..12..185L. doi:10.1080/00018736300101283.
- Ryan, Michael P.; Shepley, Lawrence C. (1975). Homogeneous Relativistic Cosmologies. Princeton Series in Physics. Princeton, New Jersey: Princeton University Press. ISBN 9780691645209.
- Stephani, Hans; Kramer, Dietrich; MacCallum, Malcolm; Hoenselaers, Cornelius; Herlt, Eduard (2003). Exact Solutions of Einstein's Field Equations (Second ed.). Cambridge University Press. ISBN 978-0-521-46136-8.
- Wald, Robert M. (1984). General Relativity. Chicago: University of Chicago Press. ISBN 0-226-87033-2.
