= Thurston elliptization conjecture =

- Field: Geometric topology
- Conjectured by: William Thurston
- Conjectured in: 1980
- First proof by: Grigori Perelman
- First proof in: 2006
- Implied by: Geometrization conjecture
- Equivalent to: Poincaré conjecture Spherical space form conjecture

William Thurston's elliptization conjecture states that a closed 3-manifold with finite fundamental group is spherical, i.e. has a Riemannian metric of constant positive sectional curvature.

== Relation to other conjectures ==
A 3-manifold with a Riemannian metric of constant positive sectional curvature is covered by the 3-sphere, moreover the group of covering transformations are isometries of the 3-sphere. If the original 3-manifold had in fact a trivial fundamental group, then it is homeomorphic to the 3-sphere (via the covering map). Thus, proving the elliptization conjecture would prove the Poincaré conjecture as a corollary. In fact, the elliptization conjecture is logically equivalent to two simpler conjectures: the Poincaré conjecture and the spherical space form conjecture.

The elliptization conjecture is a special case of Thurston's geometrization conjecture, which was proved in 2003 by G. Perelman.
