= Geometrization conjecture =

Three dimensional analogue of uniformization conjecture

Geometrization theorem
- Field: Geometric topology
- Conjectured by: William Thurston
- Conjectured in: 1982
- First proof by: Grigori Perelman
- First proof in: 2003
- Consequences: Poincaré conjecture Thurston elliptization conjecture

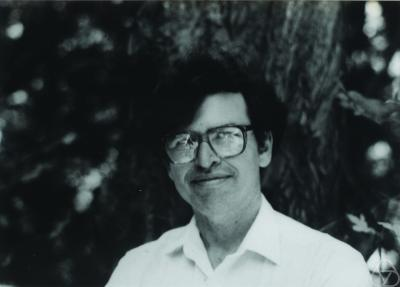
William Thurston (pictured) proposed this conjecture in 1982

In mathematics, Thurston's geometrization conjecture (now a theorem) states that each of certain three-dimensional topological spaces has a unique geometric structure that can be associated with it. It is an analogue of the uniformization theorem for two-dimensional surfaces, which states that every simply connected Riemann surface can be given one of three geometries (Euclidean, spherical, or hyperbolic).

In three dimensions, it is not always possible to assign a single geometry to a whole topological space. Instead, the geometrization conjecture states that every closed 3-manifold can be decomposed in a canonical way into pieces that each have one of eight types of geometric structure. The conjecture was proposed by William Thurston (1982) as part of his 24 questions, and implies several other conjectures, such as the Poincaré conjecture and Thurston's elliptization conjecture.

Thurston's hyperbolization theorem implies that Haken manifolds satisfy the geometrization conjecture. Thurston announced a proof in the 1980s, and since then, several complete proofs have appeared in print.

Grigori Perelman announced a proof of the full geometrization conjecture in 2003 using Ricci flow with surgery in two papers posted at the arxiv.org preprint server. Perelman's papers were studied by several independent groups that produced books and online manuscripts filling in the complete details of his arguments. Verification was essentially complete in time for Perelman to be awarded the 2006 Fields Medal for his work, and in 2010 the Clay Mathematics Institute awarded him its 1 million USD prize for solving the Poincaré conjecture, though Perelman declined both awards.

The Poincaré conjecture and the spherical space form conjecture are corollaries of the geometrization conjecture, although there are shorter proofs of the former that do not lead to the geometrization conjecture.

== The conjecture ==
A 3-manifold is called closed if it is compact – without "punctures" or "missing endpoints" – and has no boundary ("edge").

Every closed 3-manifold has a prime decomposition: this means it is the connected sum ("a gluing together") of prime 3-manifolds. (Note: This decomposition is essentially unique except for a small problem in the case of non-orientable manifolds) This reduces much of the study of 3-manifolds to the case of prime 3-manifolds: those that cannot be written as a non-trivial connected sum.

Here is a statement of Thurston's conjecture:

Every oriented prime closed 3-manifold can be cut along 2-tori, so that the interior of each of the resulting manifolds has a geometric structure with finite volume.

There are 8 possible geometric structures in 3 dimensions. There is a unique minimal way of cutting an irreducible oriented 3-manifold along tori into pieces that are Seifert manifolds or atoroidal called the JSJ decomposition, which is not quite the same as the decomposition in the geometrization conjecture, because some of the pieces in the JSJ decomposition might not have finite volume geometric structures. (For example, the mapping torus of an Anosov map of a torus has a finite volume solv structure, but its JSJ decomposition cuts it open along one torus to produce a product of a torus and a unit interval, and the interior of this has no finite volume geometric structure.)

For non-oriented manifolds the easiest way to state a geometrization conjecture is to first take the oriented double cover. It is also possible to work directly with non-orientable manifolds, but this gives some extra complications: it may be necessary to cut along projective planes and Klein bottles as well as spheres and tori, and manifolds with a projective plane boundary component usually have no geometric structure.

In 2 dimensions, every closed surface has a geometric structure consisting of a metric with constant curvature; it is not necessary to cut the manifold up first. Specifically, every closed surface is diffeomorphic to a quotient of S^{2}, E^{2}, or H^{2}.

== The eight Thurston geometries ==
A model geometry is a simply connected smooth manifold X together with a transitive action of a Lie group G on X with compact stabilizers.

A model geometry is called maximal if G is maximal among groups acting smoothly and transitively on X with compact stabilizers. Sometimes this condition is included in the definition of a model geometry.

A geometric structure on a manifold M is a diffeomorphism from M to X/Γ for some model geometry X, where Γ is a discrete subgroup of G acting freely on X ; this is a special case of a complete (G,X)-structure. If a given manifold admits a geometric structure, then it admits one whose model is maximal.

A 3-dimensional model geometry X is relevant to the geometrization conjecture if it is maximal and if there is at least one compact manifold with a geometric structure modelled on X. Thurston classified the 8 model geometries satisfying these conditions; they are listed below and are sometimes called Thurston geometries. (There are also uncountably many model geometries without compact quotients.)

There is some connection with the Bianchi groups: the 3-dimensional Lie groups. Most Thurston geometries can be realized as a left invariant metric on a Bianchi group. However S^{2} × R cannot be, Euclidean space corresponds to two different Bianchi groups, and there are an uncountable number of solvable non-unimodular Bianchi groups, most of which give model geometries with no compact representatives.

=== Spherical geometry S^{3} ===
The point stabilizer is O(3, R), and the group G is the 6-dimensional Lie group O(4, R), with 2 components. The corresponding manifolds are exactly the closed 3-manifolds with finite fundamental group. Examples include the 3-sphere, the Poincaré homology sphere, Lens spaces. This geometry can be modeled as a left invariant metric on the Bianchi group of type IX. Manifolds with this geometry are all compact, orientable, and have the structure of a Seifert fiber space (often in several ways). The complete list of such manifolds is given in the article on spherical 3-manifolds. Under Ricci flow, manifolds with this geometry collapse to a point in finite time.

=== Euclidean geometry E^{3} ===
The point stabilizer is O(3, R), and the group G is the 6-dimensional Lie group R^{3} × O(3, R), with 2 components. Examples are the 3-torus, and more generally the mapping torus of a finite-order automorphism of the 2-torus; see torus bundle. There are exactly 10 closed 3-manifolds with this geometry, 6 orientable and 4 non-orientable. This geometry can be modeled as a left invariant metric on the Bianchi groups of type I or VII_{0}. Finite volume manifolds with this geometry are all compact, and have the structure of a Seifert fiber space (sometimes in two ways). The complete list of such manifolds is given in the article on Seifert fiber spaces. Under Ricci flow, manifolds with Euclidean geometry remain invariant.

=== Hyperbolic geometry H^{3} ===
The point stabilizer is O(3, R), and the group G is the 6-dimensional Lie group O^{+}(1, 3, R), with 2 components. There are enormous numbers of examples of these, and their classification is not completely understood. The example with smallest volume is the Weeks manifold. Other examples are given by the Seifert–Weber space, or "sufficiently complicated" Dehn surgeries on links, or most Haken manifolds. The geometrization conjecture implies that a closed 3-manifold is hyperbolic if and only if it is irreducible, atoroidal, and has infinite fundamental group. This geometry can be modeled as a left invariant metric on the Bianchi group of type V or VII_{h≠0}. Under Ricci flow, manifolds with hyperbolic geometry expand.

=== The geometry of S^{2} × R ===
The point stabilizer is O(2, R) × Z/2Z, and the group G is O(3, R) × R × Z/2Z, with 4 components. The four finite volume manifolds with this geometry are: S^{2} × S^{1}, the mapping torus of the antipode map of S^{2}, the connected sum of two copies of 3-dimensional projective space, and the product of S^{1} with two-dimensional projective space. The first two are mapping tori of the identity map and antipode map of the 2-sphere, and are the only examples of 3-manifolds that are prime but not irreducible. The third is the only example of a non-trivial connected sum with a geometric structure. This is the only model geometry that cannot be realized as a left invariant metric on a 3-dimensional Lie group. Finite volume manifolds with this geometry are all compact and have the structure of a Seifert fiber space (often in several ways). Under normalized Ricci flow manifolds with this geometry converge to a 1-dimensional manifold.

=== The geometry of H^{2} × R ===
The point stabilizer is O(2, R) × Z/2Z, and the group G is O^{+}(1, 2, R) × R × Z/2Z, with 4 components. Examples include the product of a hyperbolic surface with a circle, or more generally the mapping torus of an isometry of a hyperbolic surface. Finite volume manifolds with this geometry have the structure of a Seifert fiber space if they are orientable. (If they are not orientable the natural fibration by circles is not necessarily a Seifert fibration: the problem is that some fibers may "reverse orientation"; in other words their neighborhoods look like fibered solid Klein bottles rather than solid tori.) The classification of such (oriented) manifolds is given in the article on Seifert fiber spaces. This geometry can be modeled as a left invariant metric on the Bianchi group of type III. Under normalized Ricci flow manifolds with this geometry converge to a 2-dimensional manifold.

=== The geometry of the universal cover of SL(2, R) ===
The universal cover of SL(2, R) is denoted ${\widetilde{\rm{SL}}}(2, \mathbf{R})$. It fibers over H^{2}, and the space is sometimes called "Twisted H^{2} × R". The group G has 2 components. Its identity component has the structure $(\mathbf{R}\times\widetilde{\rm{SL}}_2 (\mathbf{R}))/\mathbf{Z}$. The point stabilizer is O(2,R).

Examples of these manifolds include: the manifold of unit vectors of the tangent bundle of a hyperbolic surface, and more generally the Brieskorn homology spheres (excepting the 3-sphere and the Poincaré dodecahedral space). This geometry can be modeled as a left invariant metric on the Bianchi group of type VIII or III. Finite volume manifolds with this geometry are orientable and have the structure of a Seifert fiber space. The classification of such manifolds is given in the article on Seifert fiber spaces. Under normalized Ricci flow manifolds with this geometry converge to a 2-dimensional manifold.

=== Nil geometry ===
This fibers over E^{2}, and so is sometimes known as "Twisted E^{2} × R". It is the geometry of the Heisenberg group. The point stabilizer is O(2, R). The group G has 2 components, and is a semidirect product of the 3-dimensional Heisenberg group by the group O(2, R) of isometries of a circle. Compact manifolds with this geometry include the mapping torus of a Dehn twist of a 2-torus, or the quotient of the Heisenberg group by the "integral Heisenberg group". This geometry can be modeled as a left invariant metric on the Bianchi group of type II. Finite volume manifolds with this geometry are compact and orientable and have the structure of a Seifert fiber space. The classification of such manifolds is given in the article on Seifert fiber spaces. Under normalized Ricci flow, compact manifolds with this geometry converge to R^{2} with the flat metric.

=== Solv geometry ===
This geometry (also called Solv geometry) fibers over the line with fiber the plane, and is the geometry of the identity component of the group G. The point stabilizer is the dihedral group of order 8. The group G has 8 components, and is the group of maps from 2-dimensional Minkowski space to itself that are either isometries or multiply the metric by −1. The identity component has a normal subgroup R^{2} with quotient R, where R acts on R^{2} with 2 (real) eigenspaces, with distinct real eigenvalues of product 1. This is the Bianchi group of type VI_{0} and the geometry can be modeled as a left invariant metric on this group. All finite volume manifolds with solv geometry are compact. The compact manifolds with solv geometry are either the mapping torus of an Anosov map of the 2-torus (such a map is an automorphism of the 2-torus given by an invertible 2 by 2 matrix whose eigenvalues are real and distinct, such as $\left( {\begin{array}{*{20}c} 2 & 1 \\ 1 & 1 \\ \end{array}} \right)$), or quotients of these by groups of order at most 8. The eigenvalues of the automorphism of the torus generate an order of a real quadratic field, and the solv manifolds can be classified in terms of the units and ideal classes of this order. Under normalized Ricci flow compact manifolds with this geometry converge (rather slowly) to R^{1}.

== Uniqueness ==
A closed 3-manifold has a geometric structure of at most one of the 8 types above, but finite volume non-compact 3-manifolds can occasionally have more than one type of geometric structure. (Nevertheless, a manifold can have many different geometric structures of the same type; for example, a surface of genus at least 2 has a continuum of different hyperbolic metrics.) More precisely, if M is a manifold with a finite volume geometric structure, then the type of geometric structure is almost determined as follows, in terms of the fundamental group π_{1}(M):

- If π_{1}(M) is finite then the geometric structure on M is spherical, and M is compact.
- If π_{1}(M) is virtually cyclic but not finite then the geometric structure on M is S^{2}×R, and M is compact.
- If π_{1}(M) is virtually abelian but not virtually cyclic then the geometric structure on M is Euclidean, and M is compact.
- If π_{1}(M) is virtually nilpotent but not virtually abelian then the geometric structure on M is nil geometry, and M is compact.
- If π_{1}(M) is virtually solvable but not virtually nilpotent then the geometric structure on M is solv geometry, and M is compact.
- If π_{1}(M) has an infinite normal cyclic subgroup but is not virtually solvable then the geometric structure on M is either H^{2}×R or the universal cover of SL(2, R). The manifold M may be either compact or non-compact. If it is compact, then the 2 geometries can be distinguished by whether or not π_{1}(M) has a finite index subgroup that splits as a semidirect product of the normal cyclic subgroup and something else. If the manifold is non-compact, then the fundamental group cannot distinguish the two geometries, and there are examples (such as the complement of a trefoil knot) where a manifold may have a finite volume geometric structure of either type.
- If π_{1}(M) has no infinite normal cyclic subgroup and is not virtually solvable then the geometric structure on M is hyperbolic, and M may be either compact or non-compact.

Infinite volume manifolds can have many different types of geometric structure: for example, R^{3} can have 6 of the different geometric structures listed above, as 6 of the 8 model geometries are homeomorphic to it. Moreover if the volume does not have to be finite there are an infinite number of new geometric structures with no compact models; for example, the geometry of almost any non-unimodular 3-dimensional Lie group.

There can be more than one way to decompose a closed 3-manifold into pieces with geometric structures. For example:

- Taking connected sums with several copies of S^{3} does not change a manifold.
- The connected sum of two projective 3-spaces has a S^{2}×R geometry, and is also the connected sum of two pieces with S^{3} geometry.
- The product of a surface of negative curvature and a circle has a geometric structure, but can also be cut along tori to produce smaller pieces that also have geometric structures. There are many similar examples for Seifert fiber spaces.

It is possible to choose a "canonical" decomposition into pieces with geometric structure, for example by first cutting the manifold into prime pieces in a minimal way, then cutting these up using the smallest possible number of tori. However this minimal decomposition is not necessarily the one produced by Ricci flow; in fact, the Ricci flow can cut up a manifold into geometric pieces in many inequivalent ways, depending on the choice of initial metric.

== History ==
The Fields Medal was awarded to Thurston in 1982 partially for his proof of the geometrization conjecture for Haken manifolds.

In 1982, Richard S. Hamilton showed that given a closed 3-manifold with a metric of positive Ricci curvature, the Ricci flow would collapse the manifold to a point in finite time, which proves the geometrization conjecture for this case as the metric becomes "almost round" just before the collapse. He later developed a program to prove the geometrization conjecture by Ricci flow with surgery. The idea is that the Ricci flow will in general produce singularities, but one may be able to continue the Ricci flow past the singularity by using surgery to change the topology of the manifold. Roughly speaking, the Ricci flow contracts positive curvature regions and expands negative curvature regions, so it should kill off the pieces of the manifold with the "positive curvature" geometries S^{3} and S^{2} × R, while what is left at large times should have a thick–thin decomposition into a "thick" piece with hyperbolic geometry and a "thin" graph manifold.

In 2003, Grigori Perelman announced a proof of the geometrization conjecture by showing that the Ricci flow can indeed be continued past the singularities, and has the behavior described above.

One component of Perelman's proof was a novel collapsing theorem in Riemannian geometry. Perelman did not release any details on the proof of this result (Theorem 7.4 in the preprint 'Ricci flow with surgery on three-manifolds'). Beginning with Shioya and Yamaguchi, there are now several different proofs of Perelman's collapsing theorem, or variants thereof. Shioya and Yamaguchi's formulation was used in the first fully detailed formulations of Perelman's work.

A second route to the last part of Perelman's proof of geometrization is the method of Laurent Bessières and co-authors, which uses Thurston's hyperbolization theorem for Haken manifolds and Gromov's norm for 3-manifolds. A book by the same authors with complete details of their version of the proof has been published by the European Mathematical Society.

== Higher dimensions ==
In four dimensions, only a rather restricted class of closed 4-manifolds admit a geometric decomposition. However, lists of maximal model geometries can still be given.

The four-dimensional maximal model geometries were classified by Richard Filipkiewicz in 1983. They number eighteen, plus one countably infinite family: their usual names are E^{4}, Nil^{4}, Nil^{3} × E^{1}, Sol^{4}_{m,n} (a countably infinite family), Sol^{4}_{0}, Sol^{4}_{1}, H^{3} × E^{1}, ${\widetilde{\rm{SL}}}$ × E^{1}, H^{2} × E^{2}, H^{2} × H^{2}, H^{4}, H^{2}(C) (a complex hyperbolic space), F^{4} (the tangent bundle of the hyperbolic plane), S^{2} × E^{2}, S^{2} × H^{2}, S^{3} × E^{1}, S^{4}, CP^{2} (the complex projective plane), and S^{2} × S^{2}. No closed manifold admits the geometry F^{4}, but there are manifolds with proper decomposition including an F^{4} piece.

The five-dimensional maximal model geometries were classified by Andrew Geng in 2016. There are 53 individual geometries and six infinite families. Some new phenomena not observed in lower dimensions occur, including two uncountable families of geometries and geometries with no compact quotients.
