= Boundary parallel =

When a closed manifold embedded in M has an isotopy onto a boundary component of M

In mathematics, a connected submanifold of a compact manifold with boundary is said to be boundary parallel, ∂-parallel, or peripheral if it can be continuously deformed into a boundary component. This notion is important for 3-manifold topology.

== Boundary-parallel embedded surfaces in 3-manifolds ==
If $F$ is an orientable closed surface smoothly embedded in the interior of an manifold with boundary $M$ then it is said to be boundary parallel if a connected component of $M \smallsetminus F$ is homeomorphic to $F \smallsetminus [0, 1[$.

In general, if $(F, \partial F)$ is a topologically embedded compact surface in a compact 3-manifold $(M, \partial M)$ some more care is needed: one needs to assume that $F$ admits a bicollar, and then $F$ is boundary parallel if there exists a subset $P \subset M$ such that $F$ is the frontier of $P$ in $M$ and $P$ is homeomorphic to $F \times [0, 1]$.

== See also ==
- Atoroidal
- Satellite knot
