= Boundary-incompressible surface =

In low-dimensional topology, a boundary-incompressible surface is a two-dimensional surface within a three-dimensional manifold whose topology cannot be made simpler by a certain type of operation known as boundary compression.

Suppose M is a 3-manifold with boundary. Suppose also that S is a compact surface with boundary that is properly embedded in M, meaning that the boundary of S is a subset of the boundary of M and the interior points of S are a subset of the interior points of M. A boundary-compressing disk for S in M is defined to be a disk D in M such that $D \cap S = \alpha$ and $D \cap \partial M = \beta$ are arcs in $\partial D$, with $\alpha \cup \beta = \partial D$, $\alpha \cap \beta = \partial \alpha = \partial \beta$, and $\alpha$ is an essential arc in S ($\alpha$ does not cobound a disk in S with another arc in $\partial (S$).

The surface S is said to be boundary-compressible if either S is a disk that cobounds a ball with a disk in $\partial M$ or there exists a boundary-compressing disk for S in M. Otherwise, S is boundary-incompressible.

Alternatively, one can relax this definition by dropping the requirement that the surface be properly embedded. Suppose now that S is a compact surface (with boundary) embedded in the boundary of a 3-manifold M. Suppose further that D is a properly embedded disk in M such that D intersects S in an essential arc (one that does not cobound a disk in S with another arc in $\partial S$). Then D is called a boundary-compressing disk for S in M. As above, S is said to be boundary-compressible if either S is a disk in $\partial M$ or there exists a boundary-compressing disk for S in M. Otherwise, S is boundary-incompressible.

For instance, if K is a trefoil knot embedded in the boundary of a solid torus V and S is the closure of a small annular neighborhood of K in $\partial V$, then S is not properly embedded in V since the interior of S is not contained in the interior of V. However, S is embedded in $\partial V$ and there does not exist a boundary-compressing disk for S in V, so S is boundary-incompressible by the second definition.

== See also ==
- Incompressible surface
