= Incompressible surface =

In mathematics, an incompressible surface is a surface properly embedded in a 3-manifold, which, in intuitive terms, is a "nontrivial" surface that cannot be simplified. In non-mathematical terms, the surface of a suitcase is compressible, because we could cut the handle and shrink it into the surface. But a Conway sphere (a sphere with four holes) is incompressible, because there are essential parts of a knot or link both inside and out, so there is no way to move the entire knot or link to one side of the punctured sphere. The mathematical definition is as follows. There are two cases to consider. A sphere is incompressible if both inside and outside the sphere there are some obstructions that prevent the sphere from shrinking to a point and also prevent the sphere from expanding to encompass all of space. A surface other than a sphere is incompressible if any disk with its boundary on the surface spans a disk in the surface.

Incompressible surfaces are used for decomposition of Haken manifolds, in normal surface theory, and in the study of the fundamental groups of 3-manifolds.

== Formal definition ==
For an incompressible surface S, every compressing disk D bounds a disk D′ in S. Together, D and D′ form a 2-sphere. This sphere need not bound a ball unless M is irreducible.

Let S be a compact surface properly embedded in a smooth or PL 3-manifold M. A compressing disk D is a disk embedded in M such that

$$D \cap S = \partial D$$

and the intersection is transverse. If the curve ∂D does not bound a disk inside of S, then D is called a nontrivial compressing disk. If S has a nontrivial compressing disk, then we call S a compressible surface in M.

If S is neither the 2-sphere nor a compressible surface, then we call the surface (geometrically) incompressible.

Note that 2-spheres are excluded since they have no nontrivial compressing disks by the Jordan-Schoenflies theorem, and 3-manifolds have abundant embedded 2-spheres. Sometimes one alters the definition so that an incompressible sphere is a 2-sphere embedded in a 3-manifold that does not bound an embedded 3-ball. Such spheres arise exactly when a 3-manifold is not irreducible. Since this notion of incompressibility for a sphere is quite different from the above definition for surfaces, often an incompressible sphere is instead referred to as an essential sphere or a reducing sphere.

== Compression ==
Compressing a surface S along a disk D results in a surface S', which is obtained by removing the annulus boundary of N(D) from S and adding in the two disk boundaries of N(D).

Given a compressible surface S with a compressing disk D that we may assume lies in the interior of M and intersects S transversely, one may perform embedded 1-surgery on S to get a surface that is obtained by compressing S along D. There is a tubular neighborhood of D whose closure is an embedding of D × [-1,1] with D × 0 being identified with D and with

$$(D\times [-1,1])\cap S=\partial D\times [-1,1].$$

Then

$$(S-\partial D\times(-1,1))\cup (D\times \{-1,1\})$$

is a new properly embedded surface obtained by compressing S along D.

A non-negative complexity measure on compact surfaces without 2-sphere components is b_{0}(S) − χ(S), where b_{0}(S) is the zeroth Betti number (the number of connected components) and χ(S) is the Euler characteristic of S. When compressing a compressible surface along a nontrivial compressing disk, the Euler characteristic increases by two, while b_{0} might remain the same or increase by 1. Thus, every properly embedded compact surface without 2-sphere components is related to an incompressible surface through a sequence of compressions.

Sometimes we drop the condition that S be compressible. If D were to bound a disk inside S (which is always the case if S is incompressible, for example), then compressing S along D would result in a disjoint union of a sphere and a surface homeomorphic to S. The resulting surface with the sphere deleted might or might not be isotopic to S, and it will be if S is incompressible and M is irreducible.

== Algebraically incompressible surfaces ==
There is also an algebraic version of incompressibility. Suppose $\iota: S \rightarrow M$ is a proper embedding of a compact surface in a 3-manifold. Then S is π_{1}-injective (or algebraically incompressible) if the induced map

$$\iota_\star: \pi_1(S) \rightarrow \pi_1(M)$$

on fundamental groups is injective.

In general, every π_{1}-injective surface is incompressible, but the reverse implication is not always true. For instance, the Lens space L(4,1) contains an incompressible Klein bottle that is not π_{1}-injective.

However, if S is two-sided, the loop theorem implies Kneser's lemma, that if S is incompressible, then it is π_{1}-injective.

== Seifert surfaces ==
A Seifert surface S for an oriented link L is an oriented surface whose boundary is L with the same induced orientation. If S is not π_{1}-injective in S^{3} − N(L), where N(L) is a tubular neighborhood of L, then the loop theorem gives a compressing disk that one may use to compress S along, providing another Seifert surface of reduced complexity. Hence, there are incompressible Seifert surfaces.

Every Seifert surface of a link is related to one another through compressions in the sense that the equivalence relation generated by compression has one equivalence class. The inverse of a compression is sometimes called embedded arc surgery (an embedded 0-surgery).

The genus of a link is the minimal genus of all Seifert surfaces of a link. A Seifert surface of minimal genus is incompressible. However, it is not in general the case that an incompressible Seifert surface is of minimal genus, so π_{1} alone cannot certify the genus of a link. David Gabai proved in particular that a genus-minimizing Seifert surface is a leaf of some taut, transversely oriented foliation of the knot complement, which can be certified with a taut sutured manifold hierarchy.

Given an incompressible Seifert surface S for a knot K, then the fundamental group of S^{3} − N(K) splits as an HNN extension over π_{1}(S), which is a free group. The two maps from π_{1}(S) into π_{1}(S^{3} − N(S)) given by pushing loops off the surface to the positive or negative side of N(S) are both injections.

== See also ==
- Haken manifold
- Virtually Haken conjecture
- Thurston norm
- Boundary-incompressible surface
