= Seifert fiber space =

Topological space

A Seifert fiber space is a 3-manifold together with a decomposition as a disjoint union of circles. In other words, it is a $S^1$-bundle (circle bundle) over a 2-dimensional orbifold. Many 3-manifolds are Seifert fiber spaces, and they account for all compact oriented manifolds in 6 of the 8 Thurston geometries of the geometrization conjecture.

== Definition ==
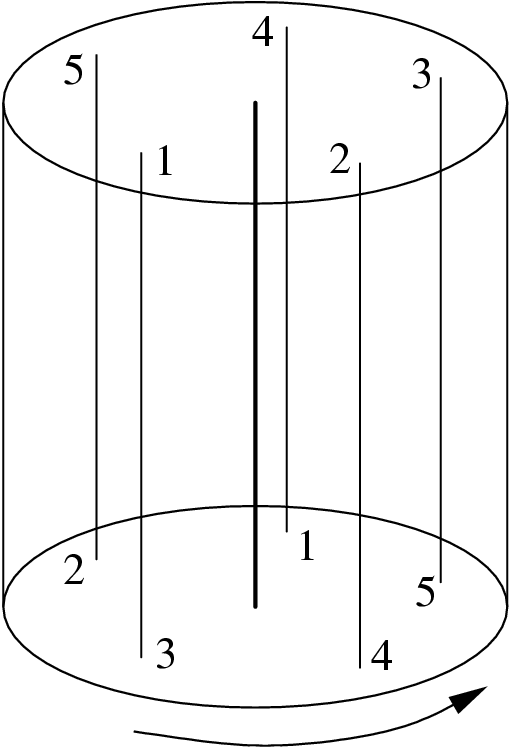
A standard fibered solid torus corresponding to (5,2) is obtained by gluing the bottom of the cylinder to the top by a 2/5 rotation clockwise.

A Seifert manifold is a closed 3-manifold together with a decomposition into a disjoint union of circles (called fibers) such that each fiber has a tubular neighborhood that forms a standard fibered torus.

A standard fibered torus corresponding to a pair of coprime integers $(a,b)$ with $a>0$ is the surface bundle of the automorphism of a disk given by rotation by an angle of $2\pi b/a$ (with the natural fibering by circles). If $a=1$ the middle fiber is called ordinary, while if $a>1$ the middle fiber is called exceptional. A compact Seifert fiber space has only a finite number of exceptional fibers.

The set of fibers forms a 2-dimensional orbifold, denoted by B and called the base —also called the orbit surface— of the fibration. It has an underlying 2-dimensional surface $B_0$, but may have some special orbifold points corresponding to the exceptional fibers.

The definition of Seifert fibration can be generalized in several ways. The Seifert manifold is often allowed to have a boundary (also fibered by circles, so it is a union of tori). When studying non-orientable manifolds, it is sometimes useful to allow fibers to have neighborhoods that look like the surface bundle of a reflection (rather than a rotation) of a disk, so that some fibers have neighborhoods looking like fibered Klein bottles, in which case there may be one-parameter families of exceptional curves. In both of these cases, the base B of the fibration usually has a non-empty boundary.

== Classification ==
Herbert Seifert classified all closed Seifert fibrations in terms of the following invariants. Seifert manifolds $M$ are denoted by symbols

$$\{b, (\varepsilon,g);(a_1,b_1),\dots,(a_r,b_r)\}\,$$

where: $\varepsilon$ is one of the 6 symbols: $o_1,o_2,n_1,n_2,n_3,n_4\,$, (or Oo, No, NnI, On, NnII, NnIII in Seifert's original notation) meaning:

- $o_1$ if B is orientable and M is orientable.
- $o_2$ if B is orientable and M is not orientable.
- $n_1$ if B is not orientable and M is not orientable and all generators of $\pi_1(B)$ preserve orientation of the fiber.
- $n_2$ if B is not orientable and M is orientable, so all generators of $\pi_1(B)$ reverse orientation of the fiber.
- $n_3$ if B is not orientable and M is not orientable and $g\ge 2$ and exactly one generator of $\pi_1(B)$ preserves orientation of the fiber.
- $n_4$ if B is not orientable and M is not orientable and $g\ge 3$ and exactly two generators of $\pi_1(B)$ preserve orientation of the fiber.

Here

- g is the genus of the underlying 2-manifold of the orbit surface.
- b is an integer, normalized to be 0 or 1 if M is not orientable and normalized to be 0 if in addition some $a_i$ is 2.
- $(a_1,b_1),\ldots,(a_r,b_r)$ are the pairs of numbers determining the type of each of the r exceptional orbits. They are normalized so that $0< b_i < a_i$ when M is orientable, and $0< b_i \le a_i/2$ when M is not orientable.

The Seifert fibration of the symbol

$$\{b, (\epsilon,g);(a_1,b_1),\ldots ,(a_r,b_r)\}$$

can be constructed from that of symbol

$$\{0, (\epsilon,g);\}$$

by using surgery to add fibers of types b and $b_i/a_i$.

If we drop the normalization conditions then the symbol can be changed as follows:

- Changing the sign of both $a_i$ and $b_i$ has no effect.
- Adding 1 to b and subtracting $a_i$ from $b_i$ has no effect. (In other words, we can add integers to each of the rational numbers $(b,b_1/a_1, \ldots ,b_r/a_r$ provided that their sum remains constant.)
- If the manifold is not orientable, changing the sign of $b_i$ has no effect.
- Adding a fiber of type (1,0) has no effect. Every symbol is equivalent under these operations to a unique normalized symbol. When working with unnormalized symbols, the integer b can be set to zero by adding a fiber of type $(1,b)$.

Two closed Seifert oriented or non-orientable fibrations are isomorphic as oriented or non-orientable fibrations if and only if they have the same normalized symbol. However, it is sometimes possible for two Seifert manifolds to be homeomorphic even if they have different normalized symbols, because a few manifolds (such as lens spaces) can have more than one sort of Seifert fibration. Also an oriented fibration under a change of orientation becomes the Seifert fibration whose symbol has the sign of all the bs changed, which after normalization gives it the symbol

$$\{-b-r, (\epsilon,g);(a_1,a_1-b_1),\ldots,(a_r,a_r-b_r)\}$$

and it is homeomorphic to this as an unoriented manifold.

The sum $b+\sum b_i/a_i$ is an invariant of oriented fibrations, which is zero if and only if the fibration becomes trivial after taking a finite cover of B.

The orbifold Euler characteristic $\chi(B)$ of the orbifold B is given by

$$\chi(B) = \chi(B_0) - \sum(1-1/a_i)$$,

where $\chi(B_0)$ is the usual Euler characteristic of the underlying topological surface $B_0$ of the orbifold B. The behavior of M depends largely on the sign of the orbifold Euler characteristic of B.

== Fundamental group ==
The fundamental group of M fits into the exact sequence

$$\pi_1(S^1)\rightarrow\pi_1(M)\rightarrow\pi_1(B)\rightarrow1$$

where $\pi_1(B)$ is the orbifold fundamental group of B (which is not the same as the fundamental group of the underlying topological manifold). The image of group $\pi_1(S^1)$ is cyclic, normal, and generated by the element h represented by any regular fiber, but the map from π_{1}(S^{1}) to π_{1}(M) is not always injective.

The fundamental group of M has the following presentation by generators and relations:

B orientable:

$$\langle u_1,v_1,...u_g,v_g,q_1,...q_r,h|u_ih=h^{\epsilon}u_i, v_ih=h^{\epsilon}v_i,q_ih=hq_i, q_j^{a_j}h^{b_j}=1, q_1...q_r[u_1,v_1]...[u_g,v_g]=h^b\rangle$$

where ε is 1 for type o_{1}, and is −1 for type o_{2}.

B non-orientable:

$$\langle v_1,...,v_g,q_1,...q_r,h| v_ih=h^{\epsilon_i}v_i,q_ih=hq_i, q_j^{a_j}h^{b_j}=1, q_1...q_rv_1^2...v_g^2=h^b\rangle$$

where ε_{i} is 1 or −1 depending on whether the corresponding generator v_{i} preserves or reverses orientation of the fiber. (So ε_{i} are all 1 for type n_{1}, all −1 for type n_{2}, just the first one is one for type n_{3}, and just the first two are one for type n_{4}.)

== Positive orbifold Euler characteristic ==
The normalized symbols of Seifert fibrations with positive orbifold Euler characteristic are given in the list below. These Seifert manifolds often have many different Seifert fibrations. They have a spherical Thurston geometry if the fundamental group is finite, and an S^{2}×R Thurston geometry if the fundamental group is infinite. Equivalently, the geometry is S^{2}×R if the manifold is non-orientable or if b + Σb_{i}/a_{i}= 0, and spherical geometry otherwise.

{b; (o_{1}, 0);} (b integral) is S^{2}×S^{1} for b=0, otherwise a lens space L(b,1). In particular, {1; (o_{1}, 0);} =L(1,1) is the 3-sphere.

{b; (o_{1}, 0);(a_{1}, b_{1})} (b integral) is the lens space L(ba_{1}+b_{1},a_{1}).

{b; (o_{1}, 0);(a_{1}, b_{1}), (a_{2}, b_{2})} (b integral) is S^{2}×S^{1} if ba_{1}a_{2}+a_{1}b_{2}+a_{2}b_{1} = 0, otherwise the lens space L(ba_{1}a_{2}+a_{1}b_{2}+a_{2}b_{1}, ma_{2}+nb_{2}) where ma_{1} − n(ba_{1} +b_{1}) = 1.

{b; (o_{1}, 0);(2, 1), (2, 1), (a_{3}, b_{3})} (b integral) This is the prism manifold with fundamental group of order 4a_{3}|(b+1)a_{3}+b_{3}| and first homology group of order 4|(b+1)a_{3}+b_{3}|.

{b; (o_{1}, 0);(2, 1), (3, b_{2}), (3, b_{3})} (b integral) The fundamental group is a central extension of the tetrahedral group of order 12 by a cyclic group.

{b; (o_{1}, 0);(2, 1), (3, b_{2}), (4, b_{3})} (b integral) The fundamental group is the product of a cyclic group of order |12b+6+4b_{2} + 3b_{3}| and a double cover of order 48 of the octahedral group of order 24.

{b; (o_{1}, 0);(2, 1), (3, b_{2}), (5, b_{3})} (b integral) The fundamental group is the product of a cyclic group of order m=|30b+15+10b_{2} +6b_{3}| and the order 120 perfect double cover of the icosahedral group. The manifolds are quotients of the Poincaré homology sphere by cyclic groups of order m. In particular, {−1; (o_{1}, 0);(2, 1), (3, 1), (5, 1)} is the Poincaré sphere.

{b; (n_{1}, 1);} (b is 0 or 1.) These are the non-orientable 3-manifolds with S^{2}×R geometry. If b is even this is homeomorphic to the projective plane times the circle, otherwise it is homeomorphic to a surface bundle associated to an orientation reversing automorphism of the 2-sphere.

{b; (n_{1}, 1);(a_{1}, b_{1})} (b is 0 or 1.) These are the non-orientable 3-manifolds with S^{2}×R geometry. If ba_{1}+b_{1} is even this is homeomorphic to the projective plane times the circle, otherwise it is homeomorphic to a surface bundle associated to an orientation reversing automorphism of the 2-sphere.

{b; (n_{2}, 1);} (b integral.) This is the prism manifold with fundamental group of order 4|b| and first homology group of order 4, except for b=0 when it is a sum of two copies of real projective space, and |b|=1 when it is the lens space with fundamental group of order 4.

{b; (n_{2}, 1);(a_{1}, b_{1})} (b integral.) This is the (unique) prism manifold with fundamental group of order 4a_{1}|ba_{1} + b_{1}| and first homology group of order 4a_{1}.

== Zero orbifold Euler characteristic ==
The normalized symbols of Seifert fibrations with zero orbifold Euler characteristic are given in the list below. The manifolds have Euclidean Thurston geometry if they are non-orientable or if b + Σb_{i}/a_{i}= 0, and nil geometry otherwise. Equivalently, the manifold has Euclidean geometry if and only if its fundamental group has an abelian group of finite index. There are 10 Euclidean manifolds, but four of them have two different Seifert fibrations. All surface bundles associated to automorphisms of the 2-torus of trace 2, 1, 0, −1, or −2 are Seifert fibrations with zero orbifold Euler characteristic (the ones for other (Anosov) automorphisms are not Seifert fiber spaces, but have sol geometry). The manifolds with nil geometry all have a unique Seifert fibration, and are characterized by their fundamental groups. The total spaces are all acyclic.

{b; (o_{1}, 0); (3, b_{1}), (3, b_{2}), (3, b_{3})} (b integral, b_{i} is 1 or 2) For b + Σb_{i}/a_{i}= 0 this is an oriented Euclidean 2-torus bundle over the circle, and is the surface bundle associated to an order 3 (trace −1) rotation of the 2-torus.

{b; (o_{1}, 0); (2,1), (4, b_{2}), (4, b_{3})} (b integral, b_{i} is 1 or 3) For b + Σb_{i}/a_{i}= 0 this is an oriented Euclidean 2-torus bundle over the circle, and is the surface bundle associated to an order 4 (trace 0) rotation of the 2-torus.

{b; (o_{1}, 0); (2, 1), (3, b_{2}), (6, b_{3})} (b integral, b_{2} is 1 or 2, b_{3} is 1 or 5) For b + Σb_{i}/a_{i}= 0 this is an oriented Euclidean 2-torus bundle over the circle, and is the surface bundle associated to an order 6 (trace 1) rotation of the 2-torus.

{b; (o_{1}, 0); (2, 1), (2, 1), (2, 1), (2, 1)} (b integral) These are oriented 2-torus bundles for trace −2 automorphisms of the 2-torus. For b=−2 this is an oriented Euclidean 2-torus bundle over the circle (the surface bundle associated to an order 2 rotation of the 2-torus) and is homeomorphic to {0; (n_{2}, 2);}.

{b; (o_{1}, 1); } (b integral) This is an oriented 2-torus bundle over the circle, given as the surface bundle associated to a trace 2 automorphism of the 2-torus. For b=0 this is Euclidean, and is the 3-torus (the surface bundle associated to the identity map of the 2-torus).

{b; (o_{2}, 1); } (b is 0 or 1) Two non-orientable Euclidean Klein bottle bundles over the circle. The first homology is Z+Z+Z/2Z if b=0, and Z+Z if b=1. The first is the Klein bottle times S^{1} and other is the surface bundle associated to a Dehn twist of the Klein bottle. They are homeomorphic to the torus bundles {b; (n_{1}, 2);}.

{0; (n_{1}, 1); (2, 1), (2, 1)} Homeomorphic to the non-orientable Euclidean Klein bottle bundle {1; (n_{3}, 2);}, with first homology Z + Z/4Z.

{b; (n_{1}, 2); } (b is 0 or 1) These are the non-orientable Euclidean surface bundles associated with orientation reversing order 2 automorphisms of a 2-torus with no fixed points. The first homology is Z+Z+Z/2Z if b=0, and Z+Z if b=1. They are homeomorphic to the Klein bottle bundles {b; (o_{2}, 1);}.

{b; (n_{2}, 1); (2, 1), (2, 1)} (b integral) For b=−1 this is oriented Euclidean.

{b; (n_{2}, 2); } (b integral) For b=0 this is an oriented Euclidean manifold, homeomorphic to the 2-torus bundle {−2; (o_{1}, 0); (2, 1), (2, 1), (2, 1), (2, 1)} over the circle associated to an order 2 rotation of the 2-torus.

{b; (n_{3}, 2); } (b is 0 or 1) The other two non-orientable Euclidean Klein bottle bundles. The one with b = 1 is homeomorphic to {0; (n_{1}, 1); (2, 1), (2, 1)}. The first homology is Z+Z/2Z+Z/2Z if b=0, and Z+Z/4Z if b=1. These two Klein bottle bundle are surface bundles associated to the y-homeomorphism and the product of this and the twist.

== Negative orbifold Euler characteristic ==
This is the general case. All such Seifert fibrations are determined up to isomorphism by their fundamental group. The total spaces are aspherical (in other words all higher homotopy groups vanish). They have Thurston geometries of type the universal cover of SL_{2}(R), unless some finite cover splits as a product, in which case they have Thurston geometries of type H_{2}×R. This happens if the manifold is non-orientable or b + Σb_{i}/a_{i}= 0.
