= Manifold Destiny =

2006 article in The New Yorker magazine

"Manifold Destiny" is an article in The New Yorker written by Sylvia Nasar and David Gruber and published in the 28 August 2006 issue of the magazine. It claims to give a detailed account (including interviews with many mathematicians) of some of the circumstances surrounding the proof of the Poincaré conjecture, one of the most important accomplishments of 20th and 21st century mathematics, and traces the attempts by three teams of mathematicians to verify the proof given by Grigori Perelman.

Subtitled "A legendary problem and the battle over who solved it", the article concentrates on the human drama of the story, especially the discussion on who contributed how much to the proof of the Poincaré conjecture. Interwoven with the article is an interview with the reclusive mathematician Grigori Perelman, whom the authors tracked down in St. Petersburg, Russia, as well as interviews with many mathematicians. The article describes Perelman's disillusionment with and withdrawal from the mathematical community and paints an unflattering portrait of the 1982 Fields Medalist Shing-Tung Yau. Yau has disputed the accuracy of the article and threatened legal action against the New Yorker. The New Yorker stood by its story and no lawsuit was filed.

The article was selected for inclusion in the book The Best American Science Writing 2007. Sylvia Nasar is best known for her biography of John Forbes Nash, A Beautiful Mind. David Gruber is a PhD recipient and graduate of Columbia University Graduate School of Journalism, who also wrote (with Vincent Pieribone) Aglow in the Dark, published by Harvard University Press.

== Summary ==
The article begins on the evening of 20 June 2006, with a description of Yau lecturing on a paper by his students, Huai-Dong Cao and Xi-Ping Zhu, in Beijing, on the occasion of Strings 2006, an international conference on string theory. That paper described their effort to verify Perelman's proof. Zhu and Cao were one of the three teams that had undertaken this task.

The article then moves on to an interview with the reclusive mathematician Grigori Perelman. The interview touches on the Fields Medal, Perelman's life prior to his proof of the Poincaré Conjecture, Richard S. Hamilton's formulation of a strategy to prove the conjecture, and William Thurston's geometrization conjecture. Yau's long collaborative friendship with Hamilton, which started after Yau learned of the latter's work on the Ricci flow, is also mentioned.

Subsequently, the article describes Yau in relation to the late Shiing-Shen Chern, his PhD advisor and predecessor in the role of the acknowledged top Chinese mathematician of his time, and the competition for leadership of the mathematical community in China. Nasar and Gruber write, "he was increasingly anxious ... [that] a younger scholar could try to supplant him as Chern's heir."

Interweaving comments from many mathematicians, the authors present a complex narrative that touches upon matters peripheral to the Poincaré conjecture but reflective of politics in the field of mathematics:

- Yau's supposed involvement in the controversy surrounding Alexander Givental's proof of a conjecture in the mathematics of mirror symmetry.
- His alleged attempt (which he denied, according to the article) to bring the ICM 2002 to Hong Kong instead of Beijing, and the tussle between him and the Chinese mathematical community that allegedly resulted.
- A conflict in 2005, in which Yau allegedly accused his student Gang Tian (a member of another team verifying Perelman's proof, and a rival for leadership in China) of plagiarism and poor scholarship while criticizing Peking University in an interview.

In discussing the Poincaré conjecture, Nasar and Gruber also reveal an allegation against Yau that had apparently not been reported in the press before their article appeared:

"On April 13th of this year, the thirty-one mathematicians on the editorial board of the Asian Journal of Mathematics received a brief e-mail from Yau and the journal’s co-editor informing them that they had three days to comment on a paper by Xi-Ping Zhu and Huai-Dong Cao titled “The Hamilton–Perelman Theory of Ricci Flow: The Poincaré and Geometrization Conjectures”, which Yau planned to publish in the journal. The e-mail did not include a copy of the paper, reports from referees, or an abstract. At least one board member asked to see the paper but was told that it was not available."

The authors also report that a week after this April email, the title of the paper dramatically changed to "A Complete Proof of the Poincaré and Geometrization Conjecture — Application of the Hamilton–Perelman Theory of The Ricci Flow". (This title was retracted on 3 December 2006.) This alleged incident with the journal has not been confirmed by an outside source; however, no one involved has yet made a statement claiming that it is false.

This paper was the result of the above-mentioned work of Zhu and Cao, which Yau promoted in the Beijing conference. The New Yorker article concludes by linking the alleged actions of Yau with Perelman's withdrawal from the mathematical community, stating that Perelman claimed not to see "what new contribution [Cao and Zhu] did make"; that he had become disillusioned by the lax ethical standards of the community. As for Yau, Perelman is quoted saying, "I can’t say I’m outraged. Other people do worse. Of course, there are many mathematicians who are more or less honest. But almost all of them are conformists. They are more or less honest, but they tolerate those who are not honest".

The article concludes with a quote from Mikhail Gromov (who earlier in the article compares Perelman's mathematical approach to that of Isaac Newton): "To do great work, you have to have a pure mind. You can think only about the mathematics. Everything else is human weakness. Accepting prizes is showing weakness." The article is accompanied by a full page cartoon that has garnered controversy, discussed below.

== Controversy ==
The article, and an included full-page color illustration of Yau grabbing the Fields Medal hanging around Perelman's neck, has garnered controversy. It has been the subject of extensive commentaries in blog. The controversy revolves around its emphasis on Yau's alleged stake in the Poincaré conjecture, its view that Yau was unfairly taking credit away from Perelman, and its depiction of Yau's supposed involvement in past controversies.

On 18 September 2006, a few weeks after publication of the article, Yau's attorneys released a letter accusing The New Yorker and the article's authors of defaming him. In the letter, the reporters are accused of fabricating quotes and deliberately molding facts into a narrative they knew to be inaccurate. The letter also asks for a public apology from The New Yorker; the magazine responded that it stands behind the story.

Two of the mathematicians interviewed in The New Yorker article — Daniel Stroock and Michael Anderson — have issued statements in opposition to The New Yorker article, after it became available online. On 6 October 2006, the statements attributed to Stroock and Anderson were posted on Yau's website. On 25 September 2006, a letter from Richard S. Hamilton was posted on Yau's website. Hamilton detailed a personal account of the history of the Ricci flow approach to the Poincaré conjecture, saying he was very disturbed by the unfair manner in which Yau had been portrayed in The New Yorker article. A number of mathematicians have posted letters expressing support for Yau on his website.

On 17 October 2006, a profile of Yau in the New York Times devoted about half its length to the Perelman dispute. The article said that Yau's promotion of the Cao–Zhu paper "annoyed many mathematicians, who felt that Dr. Yau had slighted Dr. Perelman", but also presented Yau's position, namely that he had never claimed there were gaps in Perelman’s proof, but merely that it was "not understood by all people", and that he "had a duty to dig out the truth of the proof". The same New York Times article also noted that it had been discovered that a crucial argument of the Cao–Zhu paper was identical to one from a note by Bruce Kleiner and John Lott posted online in 2003. This led to an erratum being issued by Cao and Zhu in the December 2006 issue of the same journal where the original article had appeared.

Science Magazine honored Perelman's proof of the Poincaré Conjecture as the scientific "Breakthrough of the Year", the first time this had been bestowed in the area of mathematics. The article mentioned how Cao and Zhu had copied from Kleiner and Lott and reported that Cao and Zhu "grudgingly printed an erratum acknowledging Kleiner and Lott's priority". The article also quoted Yau as saying of the Poincaré conjecture, "The methods developed … should shed light on many natural systems, such as the Navier-Stokes equation [of fluid dynamics] and the Einstein equation [of general relativity]." It also talks of animosity among mathematicians following this episode where the AMS attempted to have a panel on the Poincaré and geometrization conjectures at its January 2007 meeting in New Orleans, Louisiana. However, this attempt by the organizer John Ewing fell through after Lott refused to share the stage with Zhu.

National Public Radio (NPR) released an account of the Poincaré conjecture and the controversy surrounding The New Yorker article. David Kestenbaum, a former Harvard Physics graduate student, reported on the story. In his interview, Yau called Perelman’s work "truly original and genius", and the New Yorker article as inaccurate, denying having given a quote concerning credit contributions at a specific press conference referenced by The New Yorker. He did not directly answer if he had ever made such a statement. "NPR translated an audiotape provided by Yau" and their analysis was in agreement with Yau's statements. Sylvia Nasar was said to have declined multiple attempts for interview by NPR.

In a letter published in the January 2007 Notices of the American Mathematical Society, commenting on the New Yorker article, Joan Birman asserts that the mathematical profession has taken a "very public and very bad black mark" from the circumstances of the publication in the Asian Journal of Mathematics of the Cao–Zhu paper. Describing the paper as making "a serious assertion" about gaps in Perelman's proof and their filling by Cao and Zhu, she questions why the AJM editorial board apparently assented to publication of such a paper by authors known to have "deep personal attachments" to the AJM editors-in-chief, and based not on consultation but on notification a few days before publication, without a copy of the paper, its abstract or the reports of independent referees.

== Revision of the Cao–Zhu article ==
After the similarity with the argument by Kleiner and Lott had been pointed out, Cao and Zhu published an erratum that appeared in the November 2006 issue of the Asian Journal of Mathematics, confirming that the material was by Kleiner and Lott, stating that its uncredited appearance in the Cao–Zhu paper was due to an oversight, and apologizing for failing to properly attribute the copied argument. In the same issue, the AJM editorial board issued an apology for what it called "incautions" in the Cao–Zhu paper.

On 3 December 2006, Cao and Zhu retracted the original version of their paper, which was titled "A Complete Proof of the Poincaré and Geometrization Conjectures — Application of the Hamilton–Perelman Theory of the Ricci Flow" and posted a revised version, renamed, more modestly, "Hamilton–Perelman's Proof of the Poincaré Conjecture and the Geometrization Conjecture". Rather than the claim of the original abstract, "we give a complete proof", suggesting the proof is by the authors, the revised abstract states: "we give a detailed exposition of a complete proof". The authors also took out the phrase "crowning achievement" from the abstract.
