= List of Zhejiang University faculty =

Faculty members of a Chinese university

Faculty members of Zhejiang University listed here are associated with science, technology, humanities, culture, business, and industry, and have held academic and administrative positions including professor, lecturer, dean, provost, and research center director.

== University presidents ==
Please see the entity: Presidents of Zhejiang University

== Science and technology ==
=== Mathematical sciences ===
- Shing-Tung Yau: Main founder and academic director of the CMS (Aug 2002–present)
- Shiing-Shen Chern: a director of CMS (2002–2004)
- Chen Jiangong: professor 1929–1952; vice-president of Hangzhou University 1958
- Su Buqing: associate professor 1931; professor and head of the Department of Mathematics 1933-; university provost 1948-; dean Sep 1950-52
- M. T. Cheng: lecturer 1943–1946
- Xu-Jia Wang: lecturer, associate professor 1990–1995
- Kefeng Liu: professor, department chair and executive director of CMS 2003–present

=== Meteorology, geology, geography ===
- Ren Mei'e: lecturer 1939; professor 1940-52
- Chang Chi-yun: head of the School of Arts 1947; professor of history and geography for 14 years

=== Physics, material sciences ===
- Chien-Shiung Wu: assistant 1935–1936
- Tsung-Dao Lee: founder of ZJIMP
- Kan-Chang Wang: professor 1936–1952
- Jin Au Kong: dean 2003–2008
- Liu Chen - professor (2004–) and director (2006–)

=== Chemical, biological and medical sciences ===
- Li Shouheng: lecturer, professor, dean, provost
- Tan Jiazhen: professor 1937; head of the School of Sciences 1951
- Bei Shizhang: associate professor and head of the Department of Biology Aug 1930; head of the School of Sciences May 1950
- Tao-Chiuh Hsu: assistant and lecturer 1941–1947
- Yao Zhen: assistant and lecturer 1937–1946
- Lo Tsung-lo: professor 1940–1944
- Ba Denian: head of the School of Medicine 2003–present
- Jiang Ximing: assistant 1936
- Chen Hang: adjacent professor

=== Engineering ===
- Li Hsi-mou - Provost, dean of engineering faculty
- Li Enliang - Vice-president, chair of civil engineering

=== Economic and social sciences ===
- Wu Dingliang: professor 1945–1952
- He Weifang: dean of law school 2008–present

== Humanities and culture ==
- Jin Yong: professor 1996–1997; Dean of School of Arts 1999–2005; honorary 2007–present
- Liu Yizheng: lecturer 1937–1938
- Sha Menghai: professor

== Business and industry ==
- Zong Qinghou: professor of EMBA
- Lu Guanqiu: professor of EMBA
