= Shing-Tung Yau =

Chinese-American mathematician (born 1949)

- 丘成桐
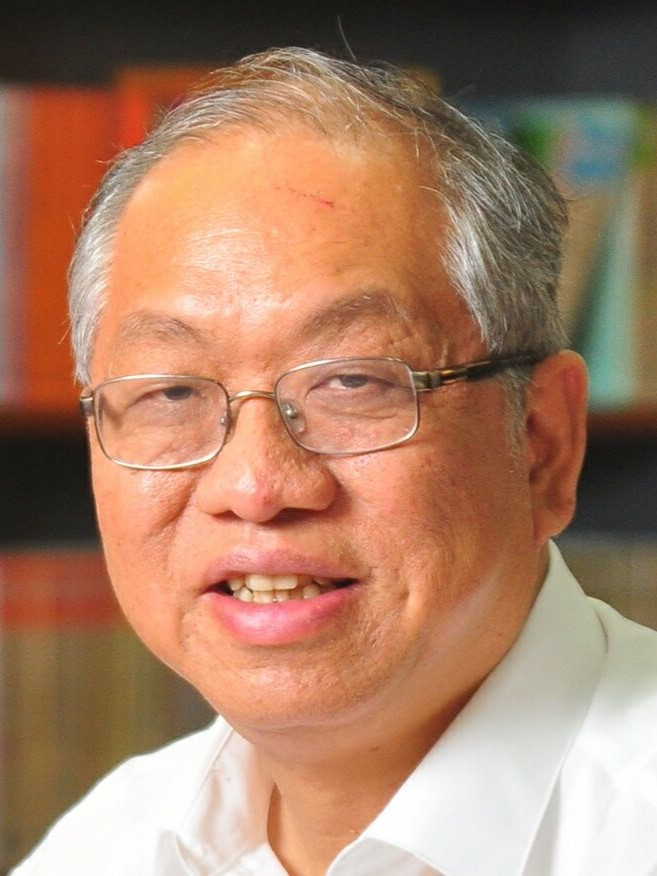
- Born: April 4, 1949 (age 77); Shantou, Republic of China
- Education: Chinese University of Hong Kong; University of California, Berkeley (PhD)
- Known for: Analysis and geometry of the Plateau problem and minimal surfaces; Bernstein's problem for maximal surfaces; Bogomolov–Miyaoka–Yau inequality; Donaldson–Uhlenbeck–Yau theorem; Frankel conjecture; Geometry of positive scalar curvature; Gradient estimates for partial differential equations; Minkowski problem; Monge–Ampère equation; Omori−Yau maximum principle; Positive mass theorem; Resolution of the Calabi conjecture and construction of Calabi–Yau manifolds; Resolution of the Willmore conjecture in the non-embedded case; SYZ conjecture and mirror symmetry; Thomas–Yau conjecture
- Spouse: Yu-yun Kuo
- Children: Michael Yau, Isaac Chiu
- Awards: John J. Carty Award (1981); Veblen Prize (1981); Fields Medal (1982); Crafoord Prize (1994); National Medal of Science (1997); Wolf Prize (2010); Shaw Prize (2023)
- Scientific career
- Fields: Mathematics
- Workplaces: Tsinghua University; Harvard University; University of California, San Diego; Stanford University; Stony Brook University; Institute for Advanced Study
- Thesis: On the Fundamental Group of Compact Manifolds of Non-Positive Curvature (1971)
- Doctoral advisor: Shiing-Shen Chern
- Doctoral students: Richard Schoen (Stanford, 1977); Robert Bartnik (Princeton, 1983); Mark Stern (Princeton, 1984); Huai-Dong Cao (Princeton, 1986); Gang Tian (Harvard, 1988); Jun Li (Stanford, 1989); Wanxiong Shi (Harvard, 1990); Lizhen Ji (Northeastern, 1991); Kefeng Liu (Harvard, 1993); Mu-Tao Wang (Harvard, 1998); Chiu-Chu Melissa Liu (Harvard, 2002); Valentino Tosatti (Harvard, 2009)

Shing-Tung Yau (Chinese: 丘成桐; pinyin: Qiū Chéngtóng; Jyutping: jau1 sing4 tung4; born April 4, 1949) is a Chinese American mathematician and educator. He is the first ethnic Chinese Fields medalist and director of the Yau Mathematical Sciences Center at Tsinghua University and professor emeritus at Harvard University. Until 2022, Yau was the William Caspar Graustein Professor of Mathematics at Harvard, at which point he moved to Tsinghua.

Yau was born in Shantou in 1949, moved to Hong Kong at a young age, and then moved to the United States in 1969. He was awarded the Fields Medal in 1982, in recognition of his contributions to partial differential equations, the Calabi conjecture, the positive energy theorem, and the Monge–Ampère equation. Yau is considered one of the major contributors to the development of modern differential geometry and geometric analysis. The impact of Yau's work are also seen in the mathematical and physical fields of convex geometry, algebraic geometry, enumerative geometry, mirror symmetry, general relativity, and string theory, while his work has also touched upon applied mathematics, engineering, and numerical analysis.

== Biography ==
Yau was born in Shantou, Teoswa, China in 1949 to Han Chinese Hakka parents.^{[YN19]} His dad's ancestral hometown is Jiaoling County, China.^{[YN19]} His mother, Yeuk Lam Leung, was from Meixian District, China; his father, Chen Ying Chiu (丘鎭英), was a Chinese Kuomintang scholar of philosophy, history, literature, and economics.^{[YN19]} He was the fifth of eight children.

During the Communist takeover of mainland China when he was only a few months old, his family moved to British Hong Kong where his schooling was (except for English classes) entirely in the Cantonese language instead of his parents' native Hakka Chinese.^{[YN19]} He was not able to revisit until 1979, at the invitation of Hua Luogeng, when mainland China entered the reform and opening up.^{[YN19]} They lived in Yuen Long at first, and then moved to Shatin in 1954.^{[YN19]} They had financial troubles from having lost all of their possessions, and his father and second-oldest sister died when he was thirteen.^{[YN19]} Yau began to read and appreciate his father's books, and became more devoted to schoolwork. After graduating from Pui Ching Middle School, he studied mathematics at the Chinese University of Hong Kong from 1966 to 1969, without receiving a degree due to graduating early.^{[YN19]} He left his textbooks with his younger brother, Stephen Shing-Toung Yau, who then decided to major in mathematics as well.

Yau left for the Ph.D. program in mathematics at University of California, Berkeley in the fall of 1969. Over the winter break, he read the first issues of the Journal of Differential Geometry, and was deeply inspired by John Milnor's papers on geometric group theory.^{[YN19]} Subsequently, he formulated a generalization of Preissman's theorem, and developed his ideas further with Blaine Lawson over the next semester. Using this work, he received his Ph.D. the following year, in 1971, under the supervision of Shiing-Shen Chern.

He spent a year as a member of the Institute for Advanced Study at Princeton before joining Stony Brook University in 1972 as an assistant professor. In 1974, he became an associate professor at Stanford University. In 1976, he took a visiting faculty position at UCLA and married physicist Yu-Yun Kuo, whom he knew from his time as a graduate student at Berkeley. In 1979, he moved back to the Institute for Advanced Study and he became a professor there in 1980. In 1984, he took a chair professorship at University of California, San Diego. In 1987, he moved to Harvard University. In April 2022, Yau retired from Harvard, where he was William Caspar Graustein Professor of Mathematics Emeritus. In the same year, he moved to Tsinghua University as a professor of mathematics.

According to Yau's autobiography, he became "stateless" in 1978 after the British Consulate revoked his Hong Kong residency due to his United States permanent residency status. Regarding his status when receiving his Fields Medal in 1982, Yau stated "I am proud to say that when I was awarded the Fields Medal in mathematics, I held no passport of any country and should certainly be considered Chinese." Yau remained "stateless" until 1990, when he obtained United States citizenship.

With science journalist Steve Nadis, Yau has written a non-technical account of Calabi-Yau manifolds and string theory,^{[YN10]} a history of Harvard's mathematics department,^{[NY13]} a case for the construction of the Circular Electron Positron Collider in China,^{[NY15]} an autobiography,^{[YN19]} and a book on the relation of geometry to physics.^{[NY24]}

== Academic activities ==
Yau has made major contributions to the development of modern differential geometry and geometric analysis. As said by William Thurston in 1981:

We have rarely had the opportunity to witness the spectacle of the work of one mathematician affecting, in a short span of years, the direction of whole areas of research. In the field of geometry, one of the most remarkable instances of such an occurrence during the last decade is given by the contributions of Shing-Tung Yau.

His most widely celebrated results include the resolution (with Shiu-Yuen Cheng) of the boundary-value problem for the Monge-Ampère equation, the positive mass theorem in the mathematical analysis of general relativity (achieved with Richard Schoen), the resolution of the Calabi conjecture, the topological theory of minimal surfaces (with William Meeks), the Donaldson-Uhlenbeck-Yau theorem (done with Karen Uhlenbeck), and the Cheng−Yau and Li−Yau gradient estimates for partial differential equations (found with Shiu-Yuen Cheng and Peter Li). Many of Yau's results (in addition to those of others) were written into textbooks co-authored with Schoen.^{[SY94]}^{[SY97]}

In addition to his research, Yau is the founder and director of several mathematical institutes, mostly in China. John Coates has commented that "no other mathematician of our times has come close" to Yau's success at fundraising for mathematical activities in mainland China and Hong Kong. During a sabbatical year at National Tsinghua University in Taiwan, Yau was asked by Charles Kao to start a mathematical institute at the Chinese University of Hong Kong. After a few years of fundraising efforts, Yau established the multi-disciplinary Institute of Mathematical Sciences in 1993, with his frequent co-author Shiu-Yuen Cheng as associate director. In 1995, Yau assisted Yongxiang Lu with raising money from Ronnie Chan and Gerald Chan's Morningside Group for the new Morningside Center of Mathematics at the Chinese Academy of Sciences. Yau has also been involved with the Center of Mathematical Sciences at Zhejiang University, at Tsinghua University, at National Taiwan University, and in Sanya. More recently, in 2014, Yau raised money to establish the Center of Mathematical Sciences and Applications (of which he is the director), the Center for Green Buildings and Cities, and the Center for Immunological Research, all at Harvard University.

Modeled on an earlier physics conference organized by Tsung-Dao Lee and Chen-Ning Yang, Yau proposed the International Congress of Chinese Mathematicians, which is now held every three years. The first congress was held at the Morningside Center from December 12 to 18, 1998. He co-organizes the annual "Journal of Differential Geometry" and "Current Developments in Mathematics" conferences. Yau is an editor-in-chief of the Journal of Differential Geometry, Asian Journal of Mathematics, and Advances in Theoretical and Mathematical Physics. As of 2021, he has advised over seventy Ph.D. students.

In Hong Kong, with the support of Ronnie Chan, Yau set up the Hang Lung Award for high school students. He has also organized and participated in meetings for high school and college students, such as the panel discussions Why Math? Ask Masters! in Hangzhou, July 2004, and The Wonder of Mathematics in Hong Kong, December 2004. Yau also co-initiated a series of books on popular mathematics, "Mathematics and Mathematical People".

In 2002 and 2003, Grigori Perelman posted preprints to the arXiv claiming to prove the Thurston geometrization conjecture and, as a special case, the renowned Poincaré conjecture. Although his work contained many new ideas and results, his proofs lacked detail on a number of technical arguments. Over the next few years, several mathematicians devoted their time to fill in details and provide expositions of Perelman's work to the mathematical community. A well-known August 2006 article in the New Yorker written by Sylvia Nasar and David Gruber about the situation brought some professional disputes involving Yau to public attention.

- Alexander Givental alleged that Bong Lian, Kefeng Liu, and Yau illegitimately took credit from him for resolving a well-known conjecture in the field of mirror symmetry. Although it is undisputed that Lian−Liu−Yau's article appeared after Givental's, they claim that his work contained gaps that were only filled in following work in their own publication; Givental claims that his original work was complete. Nasar and Gruber quote an anonymous mathematician as agreeing with Givental.
- In the 1980s, Yau's colleague Yum-Tong Siu accused Yau's Ph.D. student Gang Tian of plagiarizing some of his work. At the time, Yau defended Tian against Siu's accusations.^{[YN19]} In the 2000s, Yau began to amplify Siu's allegations, saying that he found Tian's dual position at Princeton University and Peking University to be highly unethical due to his high salary from Peking University compared to other professors and students who made more active contributions to the university.^{[YN19]} Science Magazine covered the broader phenomena of such positions in China, with Tian and Yau as central figures.
- Nasar and Gruber say that, having allegedly not done any notable work since the middle of the 1980s, Yau tried to regain prominence by claiming that Xi-Ping Zhu and Yau's former student Huai-Dong Cao had solved the Thurston and Poincaré conjectures, only partially based on some of Perelman's ideas. Nasar and Gruber quoted Yau as agreeing with the acting director of one of Yau's mathematical centers, who at a press conference assigned Cao and Zhu thirty percent of the credit for resolving the conjectures, with Perelman receiving only twenty-five (with the rest going to Richard Hamilton). A few months later, a segment of NPR's All Things Considered covering the situation reviewed an audio recording of the press conference and found no such statement made by either Yau or the acting director.

Yau claimed that Nasar and Gruber's article was defamatory and contained several falsehoods, and that they did not give him the opportunity to represent his own side of the disputes. He considered filing a lawsuit against the magazine, claiming professional damage, but says he decided that it wasn't sufficiently clear what such an action would achieve.^{[YN19]} He established a public relations website, with letters responding to the New Yorker article from several mathematicians, including himself and two others quoted in the article.

In his autobiography, Yau said that his statements in 2006 such as that Cao and Zhu gave "the first complete and detailed account of the proof of the Poincaré conjecture" should have been phrased more carefully. Although he does believe Cao and Zhu's work to be the first and most rigorously detailed account of Perelman's work, he says he should have clarified that they had "not surpassed Perelman's work in any way."^{[YN19]} He has also maintained the view that (as of 2019) the final parts of Perelman's proof should be better understood by the mathematical community, with the corresponding possibility that there remain some unnoticed errors.

== Technical contributions to mathematics ==
Yau has made a number of major research contributions, centered on differential geometry and its appearance in other fields of mathematics and science. In addition to his research, Yau has compiled influential sets of open problems in differential geometry, including both well-known old conjectures with new proposals and problems. Two of Yau's most widely cited problem lists from the 1980s have been updated with notes on progress as of 2014. Particularly well-known are a conjecture on existence of minimal hypersurfaces and on the spectral geometry of minimal hypersurfaces.

=== Calabi conjecture ===
In 1978, by studying the complex Monge–Ampère equation, Yau resolved the Calabi conjecture, which had been posed by Eugenio Calabi in 1954.^{[Y78a]} As a special case, this showed that Kähler-Einstein metrics exist on any closed Kähler manifold whose first Chern class is nonpositive. Yau's method adapted earlier work of Calabi, Jürgen Moser, and Aleksei Pogorelov, developed for quasilinear elliptic partial differential equations and the real Monge–Ampère equation, to the setting of the complex Monge–Ampère equation.

- In differential geometry, Yau's theorem is significant in proving the general existence of closed manifolds of special holonomy; any simply-connected closed Kähler manifold which is Ricci flat must have its holonomy group contained in the special unitary group, according to the Ambrose–Singer theorem. Examples of compact Riemannian manifolds with other special holonomy groups have been found by Dominic Joyce and Peter Kronheimer, although no proposals for general existence results, analogous to Calabi's conjecture, have been successfully identified in the case of the other groups.
- In algebraic geometry, the existence of canonical metrics as proposed by Calabi allows one to give equally canonical representatives of characteristic classes by differential forms. Due to Yau's initial efforts at disproving the Calabi conjecture by showing that it would lead to contradictions in such contexts, he was able to draw striking corollaries to the conjecture itself.^{[Y77]} In particular, the Calabi conjecture implies the Miyaoka–Yau inequality on Chern numbers of surfaces, in addition to homotopical characterizations of the complex structures of the complex projective plane and of quotients of the two-dimensional complex unit ball.
- A special case of the Calabi conjecture asserts that a Kähler metric of zero Ricci curvature must exist on any Kähler manifold whose first Chern class is zero. In string theory, it was discovered in 1985 by Philip Candelas, Gary Horowitz, Andrew Strominger, and Edward Witten that these Calabi–Yau manifolds, due to their special holonomy, are the appropriate configuration spaces for superstrings. For this reason, Yau's resolution of the Calabi conjecture is considered to be of fundamental importance in modern string theory.

The understanding of the Calabi conjecture in the noncompact setting is less definitive. Gang Tian and Yau extended Yau's analysis of the complex Monge−Ampère equation to the noncompact setting, where the use of cutoff functions and corresponding integral estimates necessitated the conditional assumption of certain controlled geometry near infinity.^{[TY90]} This reduces the problem to the question of existence of Kähler metrics with such asymptotic properties; they obtained such metrics for certain smooth quasi-projective complex varieties. They later extended their work to allow orbifold singularities.^{[TY91]} With Brian Greene, Alfred Shapere, and Cumrun Vafa, Yau introduced an ansatz for a Kähler metric on the set of regular points of certain surjective holomorphic maps, with Ricci curvature approximately zero.^{[G+90]} They were able to apply the Tian−Yau existence theorem to construct a Kähler metric which is exactly Ricci-flat. The Greene−Shapere−Vafa−Yau ansatz and its natural generalization, now known as a semi-flat metric, has become important in several analyses of problems in Kähler geometry.

=== Scalar curvature and general relativity ===
The positive energy theorem, obtained by Yau in collaboration with his former doctoral student Richard Schoen, can be described in physical terms:

In Einstein's theory of general relativity, the gravitational energy of an isolated physical system is nonnegative.

However, it is a precise theorem of differential geometry and geometric analysis, in which physical systems are modeled by Riemannian manifolds with nonnegativity of a certain generalized scalar curvature. As such, Schoen and Yau's approach originated in their study of Riemannian manifolds of positive scalar curvature, which is of interest in and of itself. The starting point of Schoen and Yau's analysis is their identification of a simple but novel way of inserting the Gauss–Codazzi equations into the second variation formula for the area of a stable minimal hypersurface of a three-dimensional Riemannian manifold. The Gauss–Bonnet theorem then highly constrains the possible topology of such a surface when the ambient manifold has positive scalar curvature.^{[SY79a]}

Schoen and Yau exploited this observation by finding novel constructions of stable minimal hypersurfaces with various controlled properties.^{[SY79a]} Some of their existence results were developed simultaneously with similar results of Jonathan Sacks and Karen Uhlenbeck, using different techniques. Their fundamental result is on the existence of minimal immersions with prescribed topological behavior. As a consequence of their calculation with the Gauss–Bonnet theorem, they were able to conclude that certain topologically distinguished three-dimensional manifolds cannot have any Riemannian metric of nonnegative scalar curvature.

Schoen and Yau then adapted their work to the setting of certain Riemannian asymptotically flat initial data sets in general relativity. They proved that negativity of the mass would allow one to invoke the Plateau problem to construct stable minimal surfaces which are geodesically complete. A noncompact analogue of their calculation with the Gauss–Bonnet theorem then provides a logical contradiction to the negativity of mass. As such, they were able to prove the positive mass theorem in the special case of their Riemannian initial data sets.^{[SY79c]}

Schoen and Yau extended this to the full Lorentzian formulation of the positive mass theorem by studying a partial differential equation proposed by Pong-Soo Jang. They proved that solutions to the Jang equation exist away from the apparent horizons of black holes, at which solutions can diverge to infinity.^{[SY81]} By relating the geometry of a Lorentzian initial data set to the geometry of the graph of such a solution to the Jang equation, interpreting the latter as a Riemannian initial data set, Schoen and Yau proved the full positive energy theorem. Furthermore, by reverse-engineering their analysis of the Jang equation, they were able to establish that any sufficient concentration of energy in general relativity must be accompanied by an apparent horizon.^{[SY83]}

Due to the use of the Gauss–Bonnet theorem, these results were originally restricted to the case of three-dimensional Riemannian manifolds and four-dimensional Lorentzian manifolds. Schoen and Yau established an induction on dimension by constructing Riemannian metrics of positive scalar curvature on minimal hypersurfaces of Riemannian manifolds which have positive scalar curvature.^{[SY79b]} Such minimal hypersurfaces, which were constructed by means of geometric measure theory by Frederick Almgren and Herbert Federer, are generally not smooth in large dimensions, so these methods only directly apply up for Riemannian manifolds of dimension less than eight. Without any dimensional restriction, Schoen and Yau proved the positive mass theorem in the class of locally conformally flat manifolds.^{[SY88]} In 2017, Schoen and Yau published a preprint claiming to resolve these difficulties, thereby proving the induction without dimensional restriction and verifying the Riemannian positive mass theorem in arbitrary dimension.

Gerhard Huisken and Yau made a further study of the asymptotic region of Riemannian manifolds with strictly positive mass. Huisken had earlier initiated the study of volume-preserving mean curvature flow of hypersurfaces of Euclidean space. Huisken and Yau adapted his work to the Riemannian setting, proving a long-time existence and convergence theorem for the flow. As a corollary, they established a new geometric feature of positive-mass manifolds, which is that their asymptotic regions are foliated by surfaces of constant mean curvature.^{[HY96]}

=== Omori−Yau maximum principle ===
Traditionally, the maximum principle technique is only applied directly on compact spaces, as maxima are then guaranteed to exist. In 1967, Hideki Omori found a novel maximum principle which applies on noncompact Riemannian manifolds whose sectional curvatures are bounded below. It is trivial that approximate maxima exist; Omori additionally proved the existence of approximate maxima where the values of the gradient and second derivatives are suitably controlled. Yau partially extended Omori's result to require only a lower bound on Ricci curvature; the result is known as the Omori−Yau maximum principle.^{[Y75b]} Such generality is useful due to the appearance of Ricci curvature in the Bochner formula, where a lower bound is also typically used in algebraic manipulations. In addition to giving a very simple proof of the principle itself, Shiu-Yuen Cheng and Yau were able to show that the Ricci curvature assumption in the Omori−Yau maximum principle can be replaced by the assumption of the existence of cutoff functions with certain controllable geometry.^{[CY75]}

Yau was able to directly apply the Omori−Yau principle to generalize the classical Schwarz−Pick lemma of complex analysis. Lars Ahlfors, among others, had previously generalized the lemma to the setting of Riemann surfaces. With his methods, Yau was able to consider the setting of a mapping from a complete Kähler manifold (with a lower bound on Ricci curvature) to a Hermitian manifold with holomorphic bisectional curvature bounded above by a negative number.^{[Y78b]}

Cheng and Yau extensively used their variant of the Omori−Yau principle to find Kähler−Einstein metrics on noncompact Kähler manifolds, under an ansatz developed by Charles Fefferman. The estimates involved in the method of continuity were not as difficult as in Yau's earlier work on the Calabi conjecture, due to the fact that Cheng and Yau only considered Kähler−Einstein metrics with negative scalar curvature. The more subtle question, where Fefferman's earlier work became important, is to do with geodesic completeness. In particular, Cheng and Yau were able to find complete Kähler-Einstein metrics of negative scalar curvature on any bounded, smooth, and strictly pseudoconvex subset of complex Euclidean space.^{[CY80]} These can be thought of as complex geometric analogues of the Poincaré ball model of hyperbolic space.

=== Differential Harnack inequalities ===
Yau's original application of the Omori−Yau maximum principle was to establish gradient estimates for a number of second-order elliptic partial differential equations.^{[Y75b]} Given a function on a complete and smooth Riemannian manifold which satisfies various conditions relating the Laplacian to the function and gradient values, Yau applied the maximum principle to various complicated composite expressions to control the size of the gradient. Although the algebraic manipulations involved are complex, the conceptual form of Yau's proof is strikingly simple.

Yau's novel gradient estimates have come to be called "differential Harnack inequalities" since they can be integrated along arbitrary paths in to recover inequalities which are of the form of the classical Harnack inequalities, directly comparing the values of a solution to a differential equation at two different input points. By making use of Calabi's study of the distance function on a Riemannian manifold, Yau and Shiu-Yuen Cheng gave a powerful localization of Yau's gradient estimates, using the same methods to simplify the proof of the Omori−Yau maximum principle.^{[CY75]} Such estimates are widely quoted in the particular case of harmonic functions on a Riemannian manifold, although Yau and Cheng−Yau's original results cover more general scenarios.

In 1986, Yau and Peter Li made use of the same methods to study parabolic partial differential equations on Riemannian manifolds.^{[LY86]} Richard Hamilton generalized their results in certain geometric settings to matrix inequalities. Analogues of the Li−Yau and Hamilton−Li−Yau inequalities are of great importance in the theory of Ricci flow, where Hamilton proved a matrix differential Harnack inequality for the curvature operator of certain Ricci flows, and Grigori Perelman proved a differential Harnack inequality for the solutions of a backwards heat equation coupled with a Ricci flow.

Cheng and Yau were able to use their differential Harnack estimates to show that, under certain geometric conditions, closed submanifolds of complete Riemannian or pseudo-Riemannian spaces are themselves complete. For instance, they showed that if M is a spacelike hypersurface of Minkowski space which is topologically closed and has constant mean curvature, then the induced Riemannian metric on M is complete.^{[CY76a]} Analogously, they showed that if M is an affine hypersphere of affine space which is topologically closed, then the induced affine metric on M is complete.^{[CY86]} Such results are achieved by deriving a differential Harnack inequality for the (squared) distance function to a given point and integrating along intrinsically defined paths.

=== Donaldson−Uhlenbeck−Yau theorem ===
In 1985, Simon Donaldson showed that, over a nonsingular projective variety of complex dimension two, a holomorphic vector bundle admits a hermitian Yang–Mills connection if and only if the bundle is stable. A result of Yau and Karen Uhlenbeck generalized Donaldson's result to allow a compact Kähler manifold of any dimension.^{[UY86]} The Uhlenbeck–Yau method relied upon elliptic partial differential equations while Donaldson's used parabolic partial differential equations, roughly in parallel to Eells and Sampson's epochal work on harmonic maps. The results of Donaldson and Uhlenbeck–Yau have since been extended by other authors. Uhlenbeck and Yau's article is important in giving a clear reason that stability of the holomorphic vector bundle can be related to the analytic methods used in constructing a hermitian Yang–Mills connection. The essential mechanism is that if an approximating sequence of hermitian connections fails to converge to the required Yang–Mills connection, then they can be rescaled to converge to a subsheaf which can be verified to be destabilizing by Chern–Weil theory.

Like the Calabi–Yau theorem, the Donaldson–Uhlenbeck–Yau theorem is of interest in theoretical physics. In the interest of an appropriately general formulation of supersymmetry, Andrew Strominger included the hermitian Yang–Mills condition as part of his Strominger system, a proposal for the extension of the Calabi−Yau condition to non-Kähler manifolds. Ji-Xiang Fu and Yau introduced an ansatz for the solution of Strominger's system on certain three-dimensional complex manifolds, reducing the problem to a complex Monge−Ampère equation, which they solved.^{[FY08]}

Yau's solution of the Calabi conjecture had given a reasonably complete answer to the question of how Kähler metrics on compact complex manifolds of nonpositive first Chern class can be deformed into Kähler–Einstein metrics.^{[Y78a]} Akito Futaki showed that the existence of holomorphic vector fields can act as an obstruction to the direct extension of these results to the case when the complex manifold has positive first Chern class. A proposal of Calabi's suggested that Kähler–Einstein metrics exist on any compact Kähler manifolds with positive first Chern class which admit no holomorphic vector fields.^{[Y82b]} During the 1980s, Yau and others came to understand that this criterion could not be sufficient. Inspired by the Donaldson−Uhlenbeck−Yau theorem, Yau proposed that the existence of Kähler–Einstein metrics must be linked to stability of the complex manifold in the sense of geometric invariant theory, with the idea of studying holomorphic vector fields along projective embeddings, rather than holomorphic vector fields on the manifold itself.^{[Y93][Y14a]} Subsequent research of Gang Tian and Simon Donaldson refined this conjecture, which became known as the Yau–Tian–Donaldson conjecture relating Kähler–Einstein metrics and K-stability. In 2019, Xiuxiong Chen, Donaldson, and Song Sun were awarded the Oswald Veblen Prize for resolution of the conjecture.

=== Geometric variational problems ===
In 1982, Li and Yau resolved the Willmore conjecture in the non-embedded case.^{[LY82]} More precisely, they established that, given any smooth immersion of a closed surface in the 3-sphere which fails to be an embedding, the Willmore energy is bounded below by 8π. This is complemented by a 2012 result of Fernando Marques and André Neves, which says that in the alternative case of a smooth embedding of the 2-dimensional torus S^{1} × S^{1}, the Willmore energy is bounded below by 2π^{2}. Together, these results comprise the full Willmore conjecture, as originally formulated by Thomas Willmore in 1965. Although their assumptions and conclusions are quite similar, the methods of Li−Yau and Marques−Neves are distinct. Nonetheless, they both rely on structurally similar minimax schemes. Marques and Neves made novel use of the Almgren–Pitts min-max theory of the area functional from geometric measure theory; Li and Yau's approach depended on their new "conformal invariant", which is a min-max quantity based on the Dirichlet energy. The main work of their article is devoted to relating their conformal invariant to other geometric quantities.

William Meeks and Yau produced some foundational results on minimal surfaces in three-dimensional manifolds, revisiting points left open by older work of Jesse Douglas and Charles Morrey.^{[MY82]} Following these foundations, Meeks, Leon Simon, and Yau gave a number of fundamental results on surfaces in three-dimensional Riemannian manifolds which minimize area within their homology class.^{[MSY82]} They were able to give a number of striking applications. For example, they showed that if M is an orientable 3-manifold such that every smooth embedding of a 2-sphere can be extended to a smooth embedding of the unit ball, then the same is true of any covering space of M. Interestingly, Meeks-Simon-Yau's paper and Hamilton's foundational paper on Ricci flow, published in the same year, have a result in common, obtained by very distinct methods: any simply-connected compact 3-dimensional Riemannian manifold with positive Ricci curvature is diffeomorphic to the 3-sphere.

=== Geometric rigidity theorems ===
In the geometry of submanifolds, both the extrinsic and intrinsic geometries are significant. These are reflected by the intrinsic Riemannian metric and the second fundamental form. Many geometers have considered the phenomena which arise from restricting these data to some form of constancy. This includes as special cases the problems of minimal surfaces, constant mean curvature, and submanifolds whose metric has constant scalar curvature.

- The archetypical example of such questions is Bernstein's problem, as completely settled in famous work of James Simons, Enrico Bombieri, Ennio De Giorgi, and Enrico Giusti in the 1960s. Their work asserts that a minimal hypersurface which is a graph over Euclidean space must be a plane in low dimensions, with counterexamples in high dimensions. The key point of the proof of planarity is the non-existence of conical and non-planar stable minimal hypersurfaces of Euclidean spaces of low dimension; this was given a simple proof by Richard Schoen, Leon Simon, and Yau.^{[SSY75]} Their technique of combining the Simons inequality with the formula for second variation of area has subsequently been used many times in the literature.
- Given the "threshold" dimension phenomena in the standard Bernstein problem, it is a somewhat surprising fact, due to Shiu-Yuen Cheng and Yau, that there is no dimensional restriction in the Lorentzian analogue (the Bernstein problem for maximal surfaces): any spacelike hypersurface of multidimensional Minkowski space which is a graph over Euclidean space and has zero mean curvature must be a plane.^{[CY76a]} Their proof makes use of the maximum principle techniques which they had previously used to prove differential Harnack estimates.^{[CY75]} Later they made use of similar techniques to give a new proof of the classification of complete parabolic or elliptic affine hyperspheres in affine geometry.^{[CY86]}
- In one of his earliest papers, Yau considered the extension of the constant mean curvature condition to higher codimension, where the condition can be interpreted either as the mean curvature being parallel as a section of the normal bundle, or as the constancy of the length of the mean curvature. Under the former interpretation, he fully characterized the case of two-dimensional surfaces in Riemannian space forms, and found partial results under the (weaker) second interpretation.^{[Y74]} Some of his results were independently found by Bang-Yen Chen.
- Extending Philip Hartman and Louis Nirenberg's earlier work on intrinsically flat hypersurfaces of Euclidean space, Cheng and Yau considered hypersurfaces of space forms which have constant scalar curvature. The key tool in their analysis was an extension of Hermann Weyl's differential identity used in the solution of the Weyl isometric embedding problem.^{[CY77b]}

Outside of the setting of submanifold rigidity problems, Yau was able to adapt Jürgen Moser's method of proving Caccioppoli inequalities, thereby proving new rigidity results for functions on complete Riemannian manifolds. A particularly famous result of his says that a subharmonic function cannot be both positive and L^{p} integrable unless it is constant.^{[Y76]} Similarly, on a complete Kähler manifold, a holomorphic function cannot be L^{p} integrable unless it is constant.^{[Y76]}

=== Minkowski problem and Monge–Ampère equation ===
The Minkowski problem of classical differential geometry can be viewed as the problem of prescribing Gaussian curvature. In the 1950s, Louis Nirenberg and Aleksei Pogorelov resolved the problem for two-dimensional surfaces, making use of recent progress on the Monge–Ampère equation for two-dimensional domains. By the 1970s, higher-dimensional understanding of the Monge–Ampère equation was still lacking. In 1976, Shiu-Yuen Cheng and Yau resolved the Minkowski problem in general dimensions via the method of continuity, making use of fully geometric estimates instead of the theory of the Monge–Ampère equation.^{[CY76b]}

As a consequence of their resolution of the Minkowski problem, Cheng and Yau were able to make progress on the understanding of the Monge–Ampère equation.^{[CY77a]} The key observation is that the Legendre transform of a solution of the Monge–Ampère equation has its graph's Gaussian curvature prescribed by a simple formula depending on the "right-hand side" of the Monge–Ampère equation. As a consequence, they were able to prove the general solvability of the Dirichlet problem for the Monge–Ampère equation, which at the time had been a major open question except for two-dimensional domains.

Cheng and Yau's papers followed some ideas presented in 1971 by Pogorelov, although his publicly available works (at the time of Cheng and Yau's work) had lacked some significant detail. Pogorelov also published a more detailed version of his original ideas, and the resolutions of the problems are commonly attributed to both Cheng–Yau and Pogorelov. The approaches of Cheng−Yau and Pogorelov are no longer commonly seen in the literature on the Monge–Ampère equation, as other authors, notably Luis Caffarelli, Nirenberg, and Joel Spruck, have developed direct techniques which yield more powerful results, and which do not require the auxiliary use of the Minkowski problem.

Affine spheres are naturally described by solutions of certain Monge–Ampère equations, so that their full understanding is significantly more complicated than that of Euclidean spheres, the latter not being based on partial differential equations. In the parabolic case, affine spheres were completely classified as paraboloids by successive work of Konrad Jörgens, Eugenio Calabi, and Pogorelov. The elliptic affine spheres were identified as ellipsoids by Calabi. The hyperbolic affine spheres exhibit more complicated phenomena. Cheng and Yau proved that they are asymptotic to convex cones, and conversely that every (uniformly) convex cone corresponds in such a way to some hyperbolic affine sphere.^{[CY86]} They were also able to provide new proofs of the previous classifications of Calabi and Jörgens–Calabi–Pogorelov.

=== Mirror symmetry ===
A Calabi–Yau manifold is a compact Kähler manifold which is Ricci-flat; as a special case of Yau's verification of the Calabi conjecture, such manifolds are known to exist.^{[Y78a]} Mirror symmetry, which is a proposal developed by theoretical physicists dating from the late 1980s, postulates that Calabi−Yau manifolds of complex dimension three can be grouped into pairs which share certain characteristics, such as Euler and Hodge numbers. Based on this conjectural picture, the physicists Philip Candelas, Xenia de la Ossa, Paul Green, and Linda Parkes proposed a formula of enumerative geometry which encodes the number of rational curves of any fixed degree in a general quintic hypersurface of four-dimensional complex projective space. Bong Lian, Kefeng Liu, and Yau gave a rigorous proof that this formula holds.^{[LLY97]} A year earlier, Alexander Givental had published a proof of the mirror formulas; according to Lian, Liu, and Yau, the details of his proof were only successfully filled in following their own publication. The proofs of Givental and Lian–Liu–Yau have some overlap but are distinct approaches to the problem, and each have since been given textbook expositions.

The works of Givental and of Lian−Liu−Yau confirm a prediction made by the more fundamental mirror symmetry conjecture of how three-dimensional Calabi−Yau manifolds can be paired off. However, their works do not logically depend on the conjecture itself, and so have no immediate bearing on its validity. With Andrew Strominger and Eric Zaslow, Yau proposed a geometric picture of how mirror symmetry might be systematically understood and proved to be true.^{[SYZ96]} Their idea is that a Calabi−Yau manifold with complex dimension three should be foliated by special Lagrangian tori, which are certain types of three-dimensional minimal submanifolds of the six-dimensional Riemannian manifold underlying the Calabi−Yau structure. Mirror manifolds would then be characterized, in terms of this conjectural structure, by having dual foliations. The Strominger−Yau−Zaslow (SYZ) proposal has been modified and developed in various ways since 1996. The conceptual picture that it provides has had a significant influence in the study of mirror symmetry, and research on its various aspects is currently an active field. It can be contrasted with the alternative homological mirror symmetry proposal by Maxim Kontsevich. The viewpoint of the SYZ conjecture is on geometric phenomena in Calabi–Yau spaces, while Kontsevich's conjecture abstracts the problem to deal with purely algebraic structures and category theory.

=== Comparison geometry ===
In one of Yau's earliest papers, written with Blaine Lawson, a number of fundamental results were found on the topology of closed Riemannian manifolds with nonpositive curvature.^{[LY72]} Their flat torus theorem characterizes the existence of a flat and totally geodesic immersed torus in terms of the algebra of the fundamental group. The splitting theorem says that the splitting of the fundamental group as a maximally noncommutative direct product implies the isometric splitting of the manifold itself. Similar results were obtained at the same time by Detlef Gromoll and Joseph Wolf. Their results have been extended to the broader context of isometric group actions on metric spaces of nonpositive curvature.

Jeff Cheeger and Yau studied the heat kernel on a Riemannian manifold. They established the special case of Riemannian metrics for which geodesic spheres have constant mean curvature, which they proved to be characterized by radial symmetry of the heat kernel.^{[CY81]} Specializing to rotationally symmetric metrics, they used the exponential map to transplant the heat kernel to a geodesic ball on a general Riemannian manifold. Under the assumption that the symmetric "model" space under-estimates the Ricci curvature of the manifold itself, they carried out a direct calculation showing that the resulting function is a subsolution of the heat equation. As a consequence, they obtained a lower estimate of the heat kernel on a general Riemannian manifold in terms of lower bounds on its Ricci curvature. In the special case of nonnegative Ricci curvature, Peter Li and Yau were able to use their gradient estimates to amplify and improve the Cheeger−Yau estimate.^{[LY86]}

A well-known result of Yau's, obtained independently by Calabi, shows that any noncompact Riemannian manifold of nonnegative Ricci curvature must have volume growth of at least a linear rate.^{[Y76]} A second proof, using the Bishop–Gromov inequality instead of function theory, was later found by Cheeger, Mikhael Gromov, and Michael Taylor.

=== Spectral geometry ===
Given a smooth compact Riemannian manifold, with or without boundary, spectral geometry studies the eigenvalues of the Laplace–Beltrami operator, which in the case that the manifold has a boundary is coupled with a choice of boundary condition, usually Dirichlet or Neumann conditions. Paul Yang and Yau showed that in the case of a closed two-dimensional manifold, the first eigenvalue is bounded above by an explicit formula depending only on the genus and volume of the manifold.^{[YY80]} Earlier, Yau had modified Jeff Cheeger's analysis of the Cheeger constant so as to be able to estimate the first eigenvalue from below in terms of geometric data.^{[Y75a]}

In the 1910s, Hermann Weyl showed that, in the case of Dirichlet boundary conditions on a smooth and bounded open subset of the plane, the eigenvalues have an asymptotic behavior which is dictated entirely by the area contained in the region. His result is known as Weyl's law. In 1960, George Pólya conjectured that the Weyl law actually gives control of each individual eigenvalue, and not only of their asymptotic distribution. Li and Yau proved a weakened version of Pólya's conjecture, obtaining control of the averages of the eigenvalues by the expression in the Weyl law.^{[LY83]}

In 1980, Li and Yau identified a number of new inequalities for Laplace–Beltrami eigenvalues, all based on the maximum principle and the differential Harnack estimates as pioneered five years earlier by Yau and Cheng−Yau.^{[LY80]} Their result on lower bounds based on geometric data is particularly well-known, and was the first of its kind to not require any conditional assumptions. Around the same time, a similar inequality was obtained by isoperimetric methods by Mikhael Gromov, although his result is weaker than Li and Yau's. In collaboration with Isadore Singer, Bun Wong, and Shing-Toung Yau, Yau used the Li–Yau methodology to establish a gradient estimate for the quotient of the first two eigenfunctions.^{[S+85]} Analogously to Yau's integration of gradient estimates to find Harnack inequalities, they were able to integrate their gradient estimate to obtain control of the fundamental gap, which is the difference between the first two eigenvalues. The work of Singer–Wong–Yau–Yau initiated a series of works by various authors in which new estimates on the fundamental gap were found and improved.

In 1982, Yau identified fourteen problems of interest in spectral geometry, including the above Pólya conjecture.^{[Y82b]} A particular conjecture of Yau's, on the control of the size of level sets of eigenfunctions by the value of the corresponding eigenvalue, was resolved by Alexander Logunov and Eugenia Malinnikova, who were awarded the 2017 Clay Research Award in part for their work.

=== Discrete and computational geometry ===
Xianfeng Gu and Yau considered the numerical computation of conformal maps between two-dimensional manifolds (presented as discretized meshes), and in particular the computation of uniformizing maps as predicted by the uniformization theorem. In the case of genus-zero surfaces, a map is conformal if and only if it is harmonic, and so Gu and Yau are able to compute conformal maps by direct minimization of a discretized Dirichlet energy.^{[GY02]} In the case of higher genus, the uniformizing maps are computed from their gradients, as determined from the Hodge theory of closed and harmonic 1-forms.^{[GY02]} The main work is thus to identify numerically effective discretizations of the classical theory. Their approach is sufficiently flexible to deal with general surfaces with boundary.^{[GY03]} With Tony Chan, Paul Thompson, and Yalin Wang, Gu and Yau applied their work to the problem of matching two brain surfaces, which is an important issue in medical imaging. In the most-relevant genus-zero case, conformal maps are only well-defined up to the action of the Möbius group. By further optimizing a Dirichlet-type energy which measures the mismatch of brain landmarks such as the central sulcus, they obtained mappings which are well-defined by such neurological features.^{[G+04]}

In the field of graph theory, Fan Chung and Yau extensively developed analogues of notions and results from Riemannian geometry. These results on differential Harnack inequalities, Sobolev inequalities, and heat kernel analysis, found partly in collaboration with Ronald Graham and Alexander Grigor'yan, were later written into textbook form as the last few chapters of her well-known book "Spectral Graph Theory". Later, they introduced a Green's function as defined for graphs, amounting to a pseudo-inverse of the graph Laplacian.^{[CY00]} Their work is naturally applicable to the study of hitting times for random walks and related topics.

In the interest of finding general graph-theoretic contexts for their results, Chung and Yau introduced a notion of Ricci-flatness of a graph. A more flexible notion of Ricci curvature, dealing with Markov chains on metric spaces, was later introduced by Yann Ollivier. Yong Lin, Linyuan Lu, and Yau developed some of the basic theory of Ollivier's definition in the special context of graph theory, considering for instance the Ricci curvature of Erdős–Rényi random graphs.^{[LLY11]} Lin and Yau also considered the curvature–dimension inequalities introduced earlier by Dominique Bakry and Michel Émery, relating it and Ollivier's curvature to Chung–Yau's notion of Ricci-flatness.^{[LY10]} They were further able to prove general lower bounds on Bakry–Émery and Ollivier's curvatures in the case of locally finite graphs.

== Honors and awards ==
Yau has received honorary professorships from many Chinese universities, including Hunan Normal University, Peking University, Nankai University, and Tsinghua University. He has honorary degrees from many international universities, including Harvard University, Chinese University of Hong Kong, and University of Waterloo. He is a foreign member of the National Academies of Sciences of China, India, and Russia.

His awards include:

- 1975–1976, Sloan Fellow.
- 1981, Oswald Veblen Prize in Geometry.
- 1981, John J. Carty Award for the Advancement of Science, United States National Academy of Sciences.
- 1982, Fields Medal, for "his contributions to partial differential equations, to the Calabi conjecture in algebraic geometry, to the positive mass conjecture of general relativity theory, and to real and complex Monge–Ampère equations."
- 1982, elected to the American Academy of Arts and Sciences
- 1982, Guggenheim Fellowship.
- 1984–1985, MacArthur Fellow.
- 1991, Humboldt Research Award, Alexander von Humboldt Foundation, Germany.
- 1993, elected to the United States National Academy of Sciences
- 1994, Crafoord Prize.
- 1997, United States National Medal of Science.
- 2003, China International Scientific and Technological Cooperation Award, for "his outstanding contribution to PRC in aspects of making progress in sciences and technology, training researchers."
- 2010, Wolf Prize in Mathematics, for "his work in geometric analysis and mathematical physics".
- 2018, Marcel Grossmann Awards, "for the proof of the positivity of total mass in the theory of general relativity and perfecting as well the concept of quasi-local mass, for his proof of the Calabi conjecture, for his continuous inspiring role in the study of black holes physics."
- 2023, Shaw Prize in Mathematical Sciences.

== Major publications ==
Research articles. Yau is the author of over five hundred articles. The following, among the most cited, are surveyed above:

LY72.	Lawson, H. Blaine Jr.; Yau, Shing Tung (1972). "Compact manifolds of nonpositive curvature". Journal of Differential Geometry. 7 (1–2): 211–228. Bibcode:1972JDGeo...730828L. doi:10.4310/jdg/1214430828. MR 0334083. Zbl 0266.53035.

Y74.	Yau, Shing Tung (1974). "Submanifolds with constant mean curvature. I". American Journal of Mathematics. 96 (2): 346–366. doi:10.2307/2373638. JSTOR 2373638. MR 0370443. Zbl 0304.53041.

CY75.	Cheng, S. Y.; Yau, S. T. (1975). "Differential equations on Riemannian manifolds and their geometric applications". Communications on Pure and Applied Mathematics. 28 (3): 333–354. doi:10.1002/cpa.3160280303. MR 0385749. Zbl 0312.53031.

SSY75.	Schoen, R.; Simon, L.; Yau, S. T. (1975). "Curvature estimates for minimal hypersurfaces". Acta Mathematica. 134 (3–4): 275–288. doi:10.1007/BF02392104. MR 0423263. Zbl 0323.53039.

Y75a.	Yau, Shing Tung (1975). "Isoperimetric constants and the first eigenvalue of a compact Riemannian manifold". Annales Scientifiques de l'École Normale Supérieure. Quatrième Série. 8 (4): 487–507. doi:10.24033/asens.1299. MR 0397619. Zbl 0325.53039.

Y75b.	Yau, Shing Tung (1975). "Harmonic functions on complete Riemannian manifolds". Communications on Pure and Applied Mathematics. 28 (2): 201–228. doi:10.1002/cpa.3160280203. MR 0431040. Zbl 0291.31002.

CY76a.	Cheng, Shiu Yuen; Yau, Shing Tung (1976). "Maximal space-like hypersurfaces in the Lorentz–Minkowski spaces". Annals of Mathematics. Second Series. 104 (3): 407–419. Bibcode:1976AnMat.104..407C. doi:10.2307/1970963. JSTOR 1970963. MR 0431061. Zbl 0352.53021.

CY76b.	Cheng, Shiu Yuen; Yau, Shing Tung (1976). "On the regularity of the solution of the n-dimensional Minkowski problem". Communications on Pure and Applied Mathematics. 29 (5): 495–516. doi:10.1002/cpa.3160290504. MR 0423267. Zbl 0363.53030.

SY76.	Schoen, Richard; Yau, Shing Tung (1976). "Harmonic maps and the topology of stable hypersurfaces and manifolds with non-negative Ricci curvature". Commentarii Mathematici Helvetici. 51 (3): 333–341. doi:10.1007/BF02568161. MR 0438388. S2CID 120845708. Zbl 0361.53040.

Y76.	Yau, Shing Tung (1976). "Some function-theoretic properties of complete Riemannian manifold and their applications to geometry". Indiana University Mathematics Journal. 25 (7): 659–670. doi:10.1512/iumj.1976.25.25051. MR 0417452. Zbl 0335.53041. (Erratum: doi:10.1512/iumj.1982.31.31044)

CY77a.	Cheng, Shiu Yuen; Yau, Shing Tung (1977). "On the regularity of the Monge–Ampère equation det(∂^{2}u/∂x^{i}∂x^{j}) = F(x,u)". Communications on Pure and Applied Mathematics. 30 (1): 41–68. doi:10.1002/cpa.3160300104. MR 0437805. Zbl 0347.35019.

CY77b.	Cheng, Shiu Yuen; Yau, Shing Tung (1977). "Hypersurfaces with constant scalar curvature". Mathematische Annalen. 225 (3): 195–204. doi:10.1007/BF01425237. MR 0431043. S2CID 33626481. Zbl 0349.53041.

Y77.	Yau, Shing Tung (1977). "Calabi's conjecture and some new results in algebraic geometry". Proceedings of the National Academy of Sciences of the United States of America. 74 (5): 1798–1799. Bibcode:1977PNAS...74.1798Y. doi:10.1073/pnas.74.5.1798. MR 0451180. PMC 431004. PMID 16592394. Zbl 0355.32028.

Y78a.	Yau, Shing Tung (1978). "On the Ricci curvature of a compact Kähler manifold and the complex Monge–Ampère equation. I". Communications on Pure and Applied Mathematics. 31 (3): 339–411. doi:10.1002/cpa.3160310304. MR 0480350. Zbl 0369.53059.

Y78b.	Yau, Shing Tung (1978). "A general Schwarz lemma for Kähler manifolds". American Journal of Mathematics. 100 (1): 197–203. doi:10.2307/2373880. JSTOR 2373880. MR 0486659. Zbl 0424.53040.

SY79a.	Schoen, R.; Yau, Shing Tung (1979). "Existence of incompressible minimal surfaces and the topology of three-dimensional manifolds with nonnegative scalar curvature". Annals of Mathematics. Second Series. 110 (1): 127–142. doi:10.2307/1971247. JSTOR 1971247. MR 0541332. Zbl 0431.53051.

SY79b.	Schoen, R.; Yau, S. T. (1979). "On the structure of manifolds with positive scalar curvature". Manuscripta Mathematica. 28 (1–3): 159–183. doi:10.1007/BF01647970. MR 0535700. S2CID 121008386. Zbl 0423.53032.

SY79c.	Schoen, Richard; Yau, Shing Tung (1979). "On the proof of the positive mass conjecture in general relativity". Communications in Mathematical Physics. 65 (1): 45–76. Bibcode:1979CMaPh..65...45S. doi:10.1007/BF01940959. MR 0526976. S2CID 54217085. Zbl 0405.53045.

CY80.	Cheng, Shiu Yuen; Yau, Shing Tung (1980). "On the existence of a complete Kähler metric on noncompact complex manifolds and the regularity of Fefferman's equation". Communications on Pure and Applied Mathematics. 33 (4): 507–544. doi:10.1002/cpa.3160330404. MR 0575736. Zbl 0506.53031.

LY80.	Li, Peter; Yau, Shing Tung (1980). "Estimates of eigenvalues of a compact Riemannian manifold". In Osserman, Robert; Weinstein, Alan (eds.). Geometry of the Laplace Operator. University of Hawaii, Honolulu (March 27–30, 1979). Proceedings of Symposia in Pure Mathematics. Vol. 36. Providence, RI: American Mathematical Society. pp. 205–239. doi:10.1090/pspum/036. ISBN 978-0-8218-1439-0. MR 0573435. Zbl 0441.58014.

SY80.	Siu, Yum Tong; Yau, Shing Tung (1980). "Compact Kähler manifolds of positive bisectional curvature". Inventiones Mathematicae. 59 (2): 189–204. Bibcode:1980InMat..59..189S. doi:10.1007/BF01390043. MR 0577360. S2CID 120664058. Zbl 0442.53056.

YY80.	Yang, Paul C.; Yau, Shing Tung (1980). "Eigenvalues of the Laplacian of compact Riemann surfaces and minimal submanifolds". Annali della Scuola Normale Superiore di Pisa. Classe di Scienze. Serie IV. 7 (1): 55–63. MR 0577325. Zbl 0446.58017.

CY81.	Cheeger, Jeff; Yau, Shing-Tung (1981). "A lower bound for the heat kernel". Communications on Pure and Applied Mathematics. 34 (4): 465–480. doi:10.1002/cpa.3160340404. MR 0615626. Zbl 0481.35003.

CLY81.	Cheng, Siu Yuen; Li, Peter; Yau, Shing-Tung (1981). "On the upper estimate of the heat kernel of a complete Riemannian manifold". American Journal of Mathematics. 103 (5): 1021–1063. doi:10.2307/2374257. JSTOR 2374257. MR 0630777. Zbl 0484.53035.

SY81.	Schoen, Richard; Yau, Shing Tung (1981). "Proof of the positive mass theorem. II". Communications in Mathematical Physics. 79 (2): 231–260. Bibcode:1981CMaPh..79..231S. doi:10.1007/BF01942062. MR 0612249. S2CID 59473203. Zbl 0494.53028.

LY82.	Li, Peter; Yau, Shing Tung (1982). "A new conformal invariant and its applications to the Willmore conjecture and the first eigenvalue of compact surfaces". Inventiones Mathematicae. 69 (2): 269–291. Bibcode:1982InMat..69..269L. doi:10.1007/BF01399507. MR 0674407. S2CID 123019753. Zbl 0503.53042.

MSY82.	Meeks, William III; Simon, Leon; Yau, Shing Tung (1982). "Embedded minimal surfaces, exotic spheres, and manifolds with positive Ricci curvature". Annals of Mathematics. Second Series. 116 (3): 621–659. doi:10.2307/2007026. JSTOR 2007026. MR 0678484. Zbl 0521.53007.

MY82.	Meeks, William H. III; Yau, Shing Tung (1982). "The classical Plateau problem and the topology of three-dimensional manifolds. The embedding of the solution given by Douglas–Morrey and an analytic proof of Dehn's lemma". Topology. 21 (4): 409–442. doi:10.1016/0040-9383(82)90021-0. MR 0670745. Zbl 0489.57002.

LY83.	Li, Peter; Yau, Shing Tung (1983). "On the Schrödinger equation and the eigenvalue problem". Communications in Mathematical Physics. 88 (3): 309–318. Bibcode:1983CMaPh..88..309L. doi:10.1007/BF01213210. MR 0701919. S2CID 120055958. Zbl 0554.35029.

SY83.	Schoen, Richard; Yau, S. T. (1983). "The existence of a black hole due to condensation of matter". Communications in Mathematical Physics. 90 (4): 575–579. Bibcode:1983CMaPh..90..575S. doi:10.1007/BF01216187. MR 0719436. S2CID 122331620. Zbl 0541.53054.

S+85.	Singer, I. M.; Wong, Bun; Yau, Shing-Tung; Yau, Stephen S.-T. (1985). "An estimate of the gap of the first two eigenvalues in the Schrödinger operator". Annali della Scuola Normale Superiore di Pisa. Classe di Scienze. Serie IV. 12 (2): 319–333. MR 0829055. Zbl 0603.35070.

CY86.	Cheng, Shiu Yuen; Yau, Shing-Tung (1986). "Complete affine hypersurfaces. I. The completeness of affine metrics". Communications on Pure and Applied Mathematics. 39 (6): 839–866. doi:10.1002/cpa.3160390606. MR 0859275. Zbl 0623.53002.

LY86.	Li, Peter; Yau, Shing-Tung (1986). "On the parabolic kernel of the Schrödinger operator". Acta Mathematica. 156 (3–4): 153–201. Bibcode:1986AcMa..156..153L. doi:10.1007/bf02399203. MR 0834612. Zbl 0611.58045.

UY86.	Uhlenbeck, K.; Yau, S.-T. (1986). "On the existence of Hermitian–Yang–Mills connections in stable vector bundles". Communications on Pure and Applied Mathematics. 39 (S): 257–293. doi:10.1002/cpa.3160390714. MR 0861491. Zbl 0615.58045. (Erratum: doi:10.1002/cpa.3160420505)

SY88.	Schoen, R.; Yau, S.-T. (1988). "Conformally flat manifolds, Kleinian groups and scalar curvature". Inventiones Mathematicae. 92 (1): 47–71. Bibcode:1988InMat..92...47S. doi:10.1007/BF01393992. MR 0931204. S2CID 59029712. Zbl 0658.53038.

G+90.	Greene, Brian R.; Shapere, Alfred; Vafa, Cumrun; Yau, Shing-Tung (1990). "Stringy cosmic strings and noncompact Calabi–Yau manifolds". Nuclear Physics B. 337 (1): 1–36. Bibcode:1990NuPhB.337....1G. doi:10.1016/0550-3213(90)90248-C. MR 1059826. Zbl 0744.53045.

TY90.	Tian, G.; Yau, Shing-Tung (1990). "Complete Kähler manifolds with zero Ricci curvature. I". Journal of the American Mathematical Society. 3 (3): 579–609. doi:10.1090/S0894-0347-1990-1040196-6. MR 1040196. Zbl 0719.53041.

TY91.	Tian, Gang; Yau, Shing-Tung (1991). "Complete Kähler manifolds with zero Ricci curvature. II". Inventiones Mathematicae. 106 (1): 27–60. Bibcode:1991InMat.106...27T. doi:10.1007/BF01243902. MR 1123371. S2CID 122638262. Zbl 0766.53053.

HY96.	Huisken, Gerhard; Yau, Shing-Tung (1996). "Definition of center of mass for isolated physical systems and unique foliations by stable spheres with constant mean curvature". Inventiones Mathematicae. 124 (1–3): 281–311. Bibcode:1996InMat.124..281H. doi:10.1007/s002220050054. hdl:11858/00-001M-0000-0013-5B63-3. MR 1369419. S2CID 122669931. Zbl 0858.53071.

SYZ96.	Strominger, Andrew; Yau, Shing-Tung; Zaslow, Eric (1996). "Mirror symmetry is T-duality". Nuclear Physics B. 479 (1–2): 243–259. arXiv:hep-th/9606040. Bibcode:1996NuPhB.479..243S. doi:10.1016/0550-3213(96)00434-8. MR 1429831. S2CID 14586676. Zbl 0896.14024.

LLY97.	Lian, Bong H.; Liu, Kefeng; Yau, Shing-Tung (1997). "Mirror principle. I". Asian Journal of Mathematics. 1 (4): 729–763. arXiv:alg-geom/9712011. Bibcode:1997alg.geom.12011L. doi:10.4310/AJM.1997.v1.n4.a5. MR 1621573. Zbl 0953.14026.

CY00.	Chung, Fan; Yau, S.-T. (2000). "Discrete Green's functions". Journal of Combinatorial Theory. Series A. 91 (1–2): 191–214. doi:10.1006/jcta.2000.3094. MR 1779780. Zbl 0963.65120.

GY02.	Gu, Xianfeng; Yau, Shing-Tung (2002). "Computing conformal structures of surfaces". Communications in Information and Systems. 2 (2): 121–145. arXiv:cs/0212043. Bibcode:2002cs.......12043G. doi:10.4310/CIS.2002.v2.n2.a2. MR 1958012. Zbl 1092.14514.

GY03.	Gu, Xianfeng; Yau, Shing Tung (2003). "Global conformal surface parameterization". In Kobbelt, Leif; Schroeder, Peter; Hoppe, Hugues (eds.). Eurographics Symposium on Geometry Processing (Aachen, Germany, June 23–25, 2003). Goslar, Germany: Eurographics Association. pp. 127–137. doi:10.2312/SGP/SGP03/127-137.

G+04.	Gu, Xianfeng; Wang, Yalin; Chan, Tony F.; Thompson, Paul M.; Yau, Shing-Tung (2004). "Genus zero surface conformal mapping and its application to brain surface mapping". IEEE Transactions on Medical Imaging. 28 (8): 949–958. Bibcode:2004ITMI...23..949G. doi:10.1109/TMI.2004.831226. PMID 15338729.

FY08.	Fu, Ji-Xiang; Yau, Shing-Tung (2008). "The theory of superstring with flux on non-Kähler manifolds and the complex Monge–Ampère equation". Journal of Differential Geometry. 78 (3): 369–428. arXiv:hep-th/0604063. Bibcode:2008JDGeo..7834550F. doi:10.4310/jdg/1207834550. MR 2396248. Zbl 1141.53036.

LY10.	Lin, Yong; Yau, Shing-Tung (2010). "Ricci curvature and eigenvalue estimate on locally finite graphs". Mathematical Research Letters. 17 (2): 343–356. doi:10.4310/MRL.2010.v17.n2.a13. MR 2644381. Zbl 1232.31003.

LLY11.	Lin, Yong; Lu, Linyuan; Yau, Shing-Tung (2011). "Ricci curvature of graphs". Tohoku Mathematical Journal. Second Series. 63 (4): 605–627. doi:10.2748/tmj/1325886283. MR 2872958. Zbl 1237.05204.

Survey articles and publications of collected works.

Y82a.	Yau, Shing Tung (1982). "Survey on Partial Differential Equations in 3 Differential Geometry". In Yau, Shing-Tung (ed.). Survey on partial differential equations in differential geometry. Seminar on Differential Geometry. Annals of Mathematics Studies. Vol. 102. Princeton, NJ: Princeton University Press. pp. 3–71. doi:10.1515/9781400881918-002. ISBN 978-1-4008-8191-8. MR 0645729. Zbl 0478.53001.

Y82b.	Yau, Shing Tung (1982). "Problem section". In Yau, Shing-Tung (ed.). Seminar on Differential Geometry. Annals of Mathematics Studies. Vol. 102. Princeton, NJ: Princeton University Press. pp. 669–706. doi:10.1515/9781400881918-035. ISBN 978-1-4008-8191-8. MR 0645762. Zbl 0479.53001.

Y87.	Yau, Shing-Tung (1987). "Nonlinear analysis in geometry". L'Enseignement Mathématique. Revue Internationale. 2e Série. 33 (1–2): 109–158. doi:10.5169/seals-87888. MR 0896385. Zbl 0631.53002.

Y93.	Yau, Shing-Tung (1993). "Open problems in geometry". In Greene, Robert; Yau, S. T. (eds.). Differential Geometry: Partial Differential Equations on Manifolds. American Mathematical Society Summer Institute on Differential Geometry (University of California, Los Angeles, July 9–27, 1990). Proceedings of Symposia in Pure Mathematics. Vol. 54. Providence, RI: American Mathematical Society. pp. 1–28. doi:10.1090/pspum/054.1. ISBN 978-0-8218-1494-9. MR 1216573. Zbl 0801.53001.

Y00.	Yau, S.-T. (2000). "Review of geometry and analysis". Asian Journal of Mathematics. 4 (1): 235–278. doi:10.4310/AJM.2000.v4.n1.a16. MR 1803723. Zbl 1031.53004.

Y06.	Yau, Shing-Tung (2006). "Perspectives on geometric analysis". In Yau, Shing-Tung (ed.). Essays in geometry in memory of S.S. Chern. Surveys in Differential Geometry. Vol. 10. Somerville, MA: International Press. pp. 275–379. arXiv:math/0602363. doi:10.4310/SDG.2005.v10.n1.a8. MR 2408227. Zbl 1138.53004.

Y14a.	Ji, Lizhen; Li, Peter; Liu, Kefeng; Schoen, Richard, eds. (2014a). Selected expository works of Shing-Tung Yau with commentary. Vol. I. Advanced Lectures in Mathematics. Vol. 28. Somerville, MA: International Press. ISBN 978-1-57146-293-0. MR 3307244. Zbl 1401.01045.

Y14b.	Ji, Lizhen; Li, Peter; Liu, Kefeng; Schoen, Richard, eds. (2014b). Selected expository works of Shing-Tung Yau with commentary. Vol. II. Advanced Lectures in Mathematics. Vol. 29. Somerville, MA: International Press. ISBN 978-1-57146-294-7. MR 3307245. Zbl 1401.01046.

Y19a.	Cao, Huai-Dong; Li, Jun; Schoen, Richard, eds. (2019a). Selected works of Shing-Tung Yau. Part I: 1971–1991. Volume 1: Metric geometry and minimal submanifolds. Somerville, MA: International Press. ISBN 978-1-57146-376-0. Zbl 1412.01037.

Y19b.	Cao, Huai-Dong; Li, Jun; Schoen, Richard, eds. (2019b). Selected works of Shing-Tung Yau. Part I: 1971–1991. Volume 2: Metric geometry and harmonic functions. Somerville, MA: International Press. ISBN 978-1-57146-377-7. Zbl 1412.01038.

Y19c.	Cao, Huai-Dong; Li, Jun; Schoen, Richard, eds. (2019c). Selected works of Shing-Tung Yau. Part I: 1971–1991. Volume 3: Eigenvalues and general relativity. Somerville, MA: International Press. ISBN 978-1-57146-378-4. Zbl 1412.01039.

Y19d.	Cao, Huai-Dong; Li, Jun; Schoen, Richard, eds. (2019d). Selected works of Shing-Tung Yau. Part I: 1971–1991. Volume 4: Kähler geometry I. Somerville, MA: International Press. ISBN 978-1-57146-379-1. Zbl 1412.01040.

Y19e.	Cao, Huai-Dong; Li, Jun; Schoen, Richard, eds. (2019e). Selected works of Shing-Tung Yau. Part I: 1971–1991. Volume 5: Kähler geometry II. Somerville, MA: International Press. ISBN 978-1-57146-380-7. Zbl 1412.01041.

Textbooks and technical monographs.

SY94.	Schoen, R.; Yau, S.-T. (1994). Lectures on differential geometry. Conference Proceedings and Lecture Notes in Geometry and Topology. Vol. 1. Lecture notes prepared by Wei Yue Ding, Kung Ching Chang, Jia Qing Zhong and Yi Chao Xu. Translated from the Chinese by Ding and S. Y. Cheng. Preface translated from the Chinese by Kaising Tso. Cambridge, MA: International Press. ISBN 1-57146-012-8. MR 1333601. Zbl 0830.53001.

SY97.	Schoen, R.; Yau, S. T. (1997). Lectures on harmonic maps. Conference Proceedings and Lecture Notes in Geometry and Topology. Vol. 2. Cambridge, MA: International Press. ISBN 1-57146-002-0. MR 1474501. Zbl 0886.53004.

SY98.	Salaff, Stephen; Yau, Shing-Tung (1998). Ordinary differential equations (Second ed.). Cambridge, MA: International Press. ISBN 1-57146-065-9. MR 1691427. Zbl 1089.34500.

GY08.	Gu, Xianfeng David; Yau, Shing-Tung (2008). Computational conformal geometry. Advanced Lectures in Mathematics. Vol. 3. Somerville, MA: International Press. ISBN 978-1-57146-171-1. MR 2439718.

Popular books.

YN10.	Yau, Shing-Tung; Nadis, Steve (2010). The shape of inner space. String theory and the geometry of the universe's hidden dimensions. New York: Basic Books. ISBN 978-0-465-02023-2. MR 2722198. Zbl 1235.00025.

NY13.	Nadis, Steve; Yau, Shing-Tung (2013). A history in sum. 150 years of mathematics at Harvard (1825–1975). Cambridge, MA: Harvard University Press. ISBN 978-0-674-72500-3. MR 3100544. Zbl 1290.01005.

NY15.	Nadis, Steve; Yau, Shing-Tung (2015). From the Great Wall to the great collider: China and the quest to uncover the inner workings of the universe. Somerville, MA: International Press. ISBN 978-1571463104.

YN19.	Yau, Shing-Tung; Nadis, Steve (2019). The shape of a life. One mathematician's search for the universe's hidden geometry. New Haven, CT: Yale University Press. ISBN 978-0-300-23590-6. MR 3930611. Zbl 1435.32001.

NY24.	Nadis, Steve; Yau, Shing-Tung (2024). The gravity of math: how geometry rules the universe. New York: Basic Books. ISBN 978-1541604292.
