= Center of Mathematical Sciences, Zhejiang University =

Mathematical research center based in China

Center of Mathematical Sciences (CMS, simplified Chinese: 浙江大学数学科学研究中心; traditional Chinese: 浙江大學數學科學研究中心), is a renowned mathematical research center based in China. It belongs to the Zhejiang University in Hangzhou, Zhejiang.

== Introduction ==
The center was mainly founded by the Fields Medalist Shing-Tung Yau in August 2002. The first directors and advisors were mathematicians Su Buqing and Shiing-Shen Chern, both of whom are Zhejiang natives. The first academic director of the center is Shing-Tung Yau.

In China, Zhejiang University has one of the best traditions of mathematical research, which is known as the Zhe School (of Mathematics) and the Chen-Su School (of Differential Geometry; in memorial of mathematicians Su Buqing and Chen Jiangong). For continuing keeping and developing such excellent tradition, the center was founded, and coupled with the Department of Mathematics of Zhejiang University.

Every year, many mathematicians and scientists from all over the world visit or do research at the center.

== Notable people ==
The institute holds tens of permanent researcher positions or professorships. Many mathematicians from all over the world have worked in or visited the institute:

- Su Buqing (till 2003)
- Wang Yuan
- Hu Hesheng
- Gu Chaohao
- Shi Zhongci
- Fang-Hua Lin
- Kefeng Liu
- Jian-Shu Li
- Yang Lo
- Pengfei Guan
- Xu-Jia Wang
- Lizhen Ji
- Shing-Tung Yau
- Shiing-Shen Chern (till 2004)
- Chi-Wang Shu
- Huai-Dong Cao
- Xi-Ping Zhu
