= Shanghai Institute for Mathematics and Interdisciplinary Sciences =

Chinese research institute for mathematics

Shanghai Institute for Mathematics and Interdisciplinary Sciences (SIMIS)
- Type: Research institute
- Established: November 13, 2023; 2 years ago
- Director: Shing-Tung Yau
- Location: Shanghai, China
- Website: www.simis.cn

The Shanghai Institute for Mathematics and Interdisciplinary Sciences (SIMIS) is a mathematics research institution in Shanghai, China. It is a new type of research and development institution jointly supported by the Shanghai Municipal Government, Yangpu District, and Fudan University.

It aims to build a world-class research platform for fundamental science and interdisciplinary studies, combining cutting-edge basic research with talent development and collaboration. With a strong emphasis on fundamental and applied mathematics, as well as interdisciplinary applications in areas such as theoretical physics, artificial intelligence and biomedicine, the Institute is committed to addressing major scientific challenges and real-world problems.

== History ==
The Shanghai Institute for Mathematics and Interdisciplinary Sciences (SIMIS) was inaugurated on November 13, 2023, under the leadership of mathematician Shing-Tung Yau. The institute is dedicated to advancing both pure and applied mathematics, while also fostering cross-disciplinary research with fields such as physics, biomedicine, and economics. As of January 2026,the faculty and postdoctoral researchers number over 100, hailing from nearly 20 countries and regions. This diverse community continually injects vitality into the flourishing world of mathematics.

Its founding president, Shing-Tung Yau, is renowned for his groundbreaking contributions to differential geometry and mathematical physics. He is a recipient of the Fields Medal and the Wolf Prize in Mathematics.

== Research ==
SIMIS conducts research across a broad spectrum of mathematics, physics, and computer science, spanning both theoretical and applied directions. The institute hosts several active research groups, each engaged in diverse topics. Current areas of focus include:

- Differential Geometry
- Algebraic Geometry
- String Theory
- Operator Algebras
- Numerical Algebra and Computational Geometry
- Interface of Data Science and Geometry
- Computational Biology and Computational Medicine

== See also ==
- Fudan University
- Shing-Tung Yau
