= Peter Li (mathematician) =

American mathematician (born 1952)

Peter Wai-Kwong Li
- Born: April 18, 1952 (age 74)
- Education: California State University, Fresno; University of California, Berkeley (PhD)
- Known for: Li–Yau inequalities Resolution of the Willmore conjecture in the non-embedded case
- Awards: Guggenheim Fellowship; Sloan Research Fellowship
- Scientific career
- Fields: Differential geometry Partial differential equation Geometric analysis
- Workplaces: University of California, Irvine
- Doctoral advisor: Shiing-Shen Chern; Henderson Chik-Hing Yeung

Peter Wai-Kwong Li (born 18 April 1952) is an American mathematician whose research interests include differential geometry and partial differential equations, with geometric analysis in particular.

== Mathematical work ==
His most notable work includes the discovery of the Li–Yau differential Harnack inequalities, and the proof of the Willmore conjecture in the case of non-embedded surfaces, both done in collaboration with Shing-Tung Yau. He is an expert on the subject of function theory on complete Riemannian manifolds.

== Education and career ==
After undergraduate work at California State University, Fresno, he earned his Ph.D. from the University of California, Berkeley, under Shiing-Shen Chern in 1979. Presently he is Professor Emeritus at University of California, Irvine, where he has been located since 1991.

== Honors ==
He has been the recipient of a Guggenheim Fellowship in 1989 and a Sloan Research Fellowship. In 2002, he was an invited speaker in the Differential Geometry section of the International Congress of Mathematicians in Beijing, where he spoke on the subject of harmonic functions on Riemannian manifolds. In 2007, he was elected a member of the American Academy of Arts and Sciences, which cited his "pioneering" achievements in geometric analysis, and in particular his paper with Yau on the differential Harnack inequalities, and its application by Richard S. Hamilton and Grigori Perelman in the proof of the Poincaré conjecture and geometrization conjecture.

== Notable publications ==
- Li, Peter; Yau, Shing Tung (1980). "Estimates of eigenvalues of a compact Riemannian manifold". In Osserman, Robert; Weinstein, Alan (eds.). Geometry of the Laplace Operator. University of Hawaii, Honolulu (March 27–30, 1979). Proceedings of Symposia in Pure Mathematics. Vol. 36. Providence, RI: American Mathematical Society. pp. 205–239. doi:10.1090/pspum/036. ISBN 9780821814390. MR 0573435. Zbl 0441.58014.
- Cheng, Siu Yuen; Li, Peter; Yau, Shing-Tung (1981). "On the upper estimate of the heat kernel of a complete Riemannian manifold". American Journal of Mathematics. 103 (5): 1021–1063. doi:10.2307/2374257. JSTOR 2374257. MR 0630777. Zbl 0484.53035.
- Li, Peter; Yau, Shing Tung (1982). "A new conformal invariant and its applications to the Willmore conjecture and the first eigenvalue of compact surfaces". Inventiones Mathematicae. 69 (2): 269–291. Bibcode:1982InMat..69..269L. doi:10.1007/BF01399507. MR 0674407. S2CID 123019753. Zbl 0503.53042.
- Li, Peter; Yau, Shing Tung (1983). "On the Schrödinger equation and the eigenvalue problem". Communications in Mathematical Physics. 88 (3): 309–318. Bibcode:1983CMaPh..88..309L. doi:10.1007/BF01213210. MR 0701919. S2CID 120055958. Zbl 0554.35029.
- Li, Peter; Schoen, Richard (1984). "L^{p} and mean value properties of subharmonic functions on Riemannian manifolds". Acta Mathematica. 153 (3–4): 279–301. doi:10.1007/BF02392380. MR 0766266. Zbl 0556.31005.
- Li, Peter; Yau, Shing-Tung (1986). "On the parabolic kernel of the Schrödinger operator". Acta Mathematica. 156 (3–4): 153–201. doi:10.1007/bf02399203. MR 0834612. Zbl 0611.58045.
- Li, Peter; Tam, Luen-Fai (1991). "The heat equation and harmonic maps of complete manifolds". Inventiones Mathematicae. 105 (1): 1–46. Bibcode:1991InMat.105....1L. doi:10.1007/BF01232256. MR 1109619. S2CID 120167884. Zbl 0748.58006.
- Li, Peter; Tam, Luen-Fai (1992). "Harmonic functions and the structure of complete manifolds". Journal of Differential Geometry. 35 (2): 359–383. doi:10.4310/jdg/1214448079. MR 1158340. Zbl 0768.53018.
- Li, Peter (2012). Geometric analysis. Cambridge Studies in Advanced Mathematics. Vol. 134. Cambridge: Cambridge University Press. doi:10.1017/CBO9781139105798. ISBN 978-1-107-02064-1. MR 2962229. Zbl 1246.53002.
