= Shi Zhongci =

Chinese mathematician (1933–2023)

- 石钟慈
- Born: 5 December 1933; Yin County, Zhejiang, China
- Died: 13 February 2023 (aged 89); Beijing, China
- Education: Fudan University
- Scientific career
- Fields: Computational mathematics
- Workplaces: University of Science and Technology of China; Academy of Mathematics and Systems Sciences, Chinese Academy of Sciences

Chinese name
- Simplified Chinese: 石钟慈
- Traditional Chinese: 石鐘慈
Transcriptions
Standard Mandarin
- Hanyu Pinyin: Shí Zhōngcí

Shi Zhongci (Chinese: 石钟慈; 5 December 1933 – 13 February 2023), also known as Zhong-Ci Shi, was a Chinese mathematician. He was a computational mathematician and an academician of Chinese Academy of Sciences (CAS).

== Career ==
Shi was born in Yin County (now Ningbo), Zhejiang on 5 December 1933. In 1955 he graduated from Ningbo Middle School. He first studied mathematics at the Department of Mathematics, Zhejiang University, under the guidance of Professor Su Buqing. Shi then was transferred to Fudan University together with Su Buqing.

After graduating from the department of mathematics of Fudan University in 1955, Shi became one of the first Chinese visiting scholars in Soviet Union, and studied computational mathematics at the Steklov Institute of Mathematics in Moscow from 1956 till 1960.

Upon returning in 1960, Shi served in the institute of computational technology of CAS. From 1965 to 1986, he was a professor in the Department of Mathematics of University of Science and Technology of China. From 1987 to 1991, he became the director of the computation center of CAS. From 1997, Shi served as the Dean of the School of Science, Shanghai Jiao Tong University. He was a research fellow of the computation center of CAS, and the director of the national key laboratory of scientific and engineering computation. Shi was a vice-dean of the College of Sciences, Zhejiang University, and a researcher at the Center of Mathematical Sciences, Zhejiang University.

On 13 February 2023, he died of an illness in Beijing, at the age of 89.

== Academic positions ==
- Chairman of Academic Committee, the State Key Laboratory of Scientific and Engineering Computing (LSEC)
- Chairman of Academic Committee, the Institute of Computational Mathematics and Scientific/Engineering Computing (ICMSEC)
- Chief Scientist, National Key Project for Fundamental Research
