= John Morgan (mathematician) =

American mathematician

- Born: March 21, 1946 (age 80); Philadelphia
- Education: Rice University
- Awards: Sloan Research Fellow (1974); Gauss Lectureship (2008); Member of the National Academy of Sciences (2009); Fellow of the American Mathematical Society (2012)
- Scientific career
- Fields: Mathematics
- Workplaces: Stony Brook University; Columbia University
- Doctoral advisor: Morton L. Curtis
- Doctoral students: Sadayoshi Kojima; Peter Ozsváth; Zoltán Szabó

John Willard Morgan (born March 21, 1946) is an American mathematician known for his contributions to topology and geometry. He is a Professor Emeritus at Columbia University and a member of the Simons Center for Geometry and Physics at Stony Brook University.

== Life ==
Morgan received his B.A. in 1968 and Ph.D. in 1969, both from Rice University. His Ph.D. thesis, entitled Stable tangential homotopy equivalences, was written under the supervision of Morton L. Curtis. He was an instructor at Princeton University from 1969 to 1972, and an assistant professor at MIT from 1972 to 1974. He has been on the faculty at Columbia University since 1974, serving as the Chair of the Department of Mathematics from 1989 to 1991 and becoming Professor Emeritus in 2010. Morgan is a member of the Simons Center for Geometry and Physics at Stony Brook University and served as its founding director from 2009 to 2016.

From 1974 to 1976, Morgan was a Sloan Research Fellow. In 2008, he was awarded a Gauss Lectureship by the German Mathematical Society. In 2009 he was elected to the National Academy of Sciences. In 2012 he became a fellow of the American Mathematical Society. Morgan is a Member of the European Academy of Sciences.

== Mathematical contributions ==
Morgan's best-known work deals with the topology of complex manifolds and algebraic varieties. In the 1970s, Dennis Sullivan developed the notion of a minimal model of a differential graded algebra. One of the simplest examples of a differential graded algebra is the space of smooth differential forms on a smooth manifold, so that Sullivan was able to apply his theory to understand the topology of smooth manifolds. In the setting of Kähler geometry, due to the corresponding version of the Poincaré lemma, this differential graded algebra has a decomposition into holomorphic and anti-holomorphic parts. In collaboration with Pierre Deligne, Phillip Griffiths, and Sullivan, Morgan used this decomposition to apply Sullivan's theory to study the topology of compact Kähler manifolds. Their primary result is that the real homotopy type of such a space is determined by its cohomology ring. Morgan later extended this analysis to the setting of smooth complex algebraic varieties, using Deligne's formulation of mixed Hodge structures to extend the Kähler decomposition of smooth differential forms and of the exterior derivative.

In 2002 and 2003, Grigori Perelman posted three papers to the arXiv which used Richard Hamilton's theory of Ricci flow to apparently resolve the geometrization conjecture in three-dimensional topology, of which the renowned Poincaré conjecture is a special case. Perelman's first two papers claimed to prove the geometrization conjecture; the third paper gives an argument which would obviate the technical work in the second half of the second paper in order to give a shortcut to prove the Poincaré conjecture.

Starting in 2003, and culminating in a 2008 publication, Bruce Kleiner and John Lott posted detailed annotations of Perelman's first two papers to their websites, covering his work on the proof of the geometrization conjecture. In 2006, Huai-Dong Cao and Xi-Ping Zhu published an exposition of Hamilton and Perelman's works, also covering Perelman's first two articles. In 2007, Morgan and Gang Tian published a book on Perelman's first paper, the first half of his second paper, and his third paper. As such, they covered the proof of the Poincaré conjecture. In 2014, they published a book covering the remaining details for the geometrization conjecture. In 2006, Morgan gave a plenary lecture at the International Congress of Mathematicians in Madrid, saying that Perelman's work had "now been thoroughly checked. He has proved the Poincaré conjecture."

== Selected publications ==
Articles.

- Pierre Deligne, Phillip Griffiths, John Morgan, and Dennis Sullivan. Real homotopy theory of Kähler manifolds. Invent. Math. 29 (1975), no. 3, 245–274. MR 0382702
- John W. Morgan. The algebraic topology of smooth algebraic varieties. Inst. Hautes Études Sci. Publ. Math. No. 48 (1978), 137–204. MR 0516917
  - John W. Morgan. Correction to: "The algebraic topology of smooth algebraic varieties". Inst. Hautes Études Sci. Publ. Math. No. 64 (1986), 185.
- John W. Morgan and Peter B. Shalen. Valuations, trees, and degenerations of hyperbolic structures. I. Ann. of Math. (2) 120 (1984), no. 3, 401–476.
- Marc Culler and John W. Morgan. Group actions on ℝ-trees. Proc. London Math. Soc. (3) 55 (1987), no. 3, 571–604.
- John W. Morgan, Zoltán Szabó, Clifford Henry Taubes. A product formula for the Seiberg-Witten invariants and the generalized Thom conjecture. J. Differential Geom. 44 (1996), no. 4, 706–788. MR 1438191

Survey articles.

- John W. Morgan. The rational homotopy theory of smooth, complex projective varieties (following P. Deligne, P. Griffiths, J. Morgan, and D. Sullivan). Séminaire Bourbaki, Vol. 1975/76, 28ème année, Exp. No. 475, pp. 69–80. Lecture Notes in Math., Vol. 567, Springer, Berlin, 1977.
- John W. Morgan. On Thurston's uniformization theorem for three-dimensional manifolds. The Smith conjecture (New York, 1979), 37–125, Pure Appl. Math., 112, Academic Press, Orlando, FL, 1984.
- John W. Morgan. Trees and hyperbolic geometry. Proceedings of the International Congress of Mathematicians, Vol. 1, 2 (Berkeley, Calif., 1986), 590–597, Amer. Math. Soc., Providence, RI, 1987. MR 0934260
- John W. Morgan. Λ-trees and their applications. Bull. Amer. Math. Soc. (N.S.) 26 (1992), no. 1, 87–112.
- Pierre Deligne and John W. Morgan. Notes on supersymmetry (following Joseph Bernstein). Quantum fields and strings: a course for mathematicians, Vol. 1, 2 (Princeton, NJ, 1996/1997), 41–97, Amer. Math. Soc., Providence, RI, 1999.
- John W. Morgan. Recent progress on the Poincaré conjecture and the classification of 3-manifolds. Bull. Amer. Math. Soc. (N.S.) 42 (2005), no. 1, 57–78. MR 2115067
- John W. Morgan. The Poincaré conjecture. International Congress of Mathematicians. Vol. I, 713–736, Eur. Math. Soc., Zürich, 2007.

Books.

- John W. Morgan and Kieran G. O'Grady. Differential topology of complex surfaces. Elliptic surfaces with p_{g} = 1: smooth classification. With the collaboration of Millie Niss. Lecture Notes in Mathematics, 1545. Springer-Verlag, Berlin, 1993. viii+224 pp. ISBN 3-540-56674-0
- John W. Morgan, Tomasz Mrowka, and Daniel Ruberman. The L^{2}-moduli space and a vanishing theorem for Donaldson polynomial invariants. Monographs in Geometry and Topology, II. International Press, Cambridge, MA, 1994. ii+222 pp. ISBN 1-57146-006-3
- Robert Friedman and John W. Morgan. Smooth four-manifolds and complex surfaces. Ergebnisse der Mathematik und ihrer Grenzgebiete (3), 27. Springer-Verlag, Berlin, 1994. x+520 pp. ISBN 3-540-57058-6
- John W. Morgan. The Seiberg-Witten equations and applications to the topology of smooth four-manifolds. Mathematical Notes, 44. Princeton University Press, Princeton, NJ, 1996. viii+128 pp. ISBN 0-691-02597-5
- John Morgan and Gang Tian. Ricci flow and the Poincaré conjecture. Clay Mathematics Monographs, 3. American Mathematical Society, Providence, RI; Clay Mathematics Institute, Cambridge, MA, 2007. xlii+521 pp. ISBN 978-0-8218-4328-4
  - John Morgan and Gang Tian. Correction to Section 19.2 of Ricci Flow and the Poincaré Conjecture. arXiv:1512.00699
- John W. Morgan and Frederick Tsz-Ho Fong. Ricci flow and geometrization of 3-manifolds. University Lecture Series, 53. American Mathematical Society, Providence, RI, 2010. x+150 pp. ISBN 978-0-8218-4963-7
- Phillip Griffiths and John Morgan. Rational homotopy theory and differential forms. Second edition. Progress in Mathematics, 16. Springer, New York, 2013. xii+224 pp. ISBN 978-1-4614-8467-7, 978-1-4614-8468-4
- John Morgan and Gang Tian. The geometrization conjecture. Clay Mathematics Monographs, 5. American Mathematical Society, Providence, RI; Clay Mathematics Institute, Cambridge, MA, 2014. x+291 pp. ISBN 978-0-8218-5201-9
