= Stephen Shing-Toung Yau =

Chinese-American mathematician

- 丘成棟
- Born: 1952 (age 73–74); British Hong Kong
- Education: Chinese University of Hong Kong (BSc); State University of New York at Stony Brook (MA, PhD)
- Occupation: Mathematician
- Years active: 1976–present
- Employer: Tsinghua University
- Known for: Discovering the "Yau algebra" and "Yau number"; co-founding Journal of Algebraic Geometry and Communications in Information and Systems

Stephen Shing-Toung Yau (Chinese: 丘成棟; pinyin: Qiū Chéngdòng; born 1952) is a Chinese-American mathematician. He is a Distinguished Professor Emeritus at the University of Illinois at Chicago, and currently teaches at Tsinghua University. He is a Fellow of the Institute of Electrical and Electronics Engineers and the American Mathematical Society.

== Biography ==
Shing-Toung Yau was born in 1952 in British Hong Kong, with his ancestral home in Jiaoling County, Guangdong, China. He is the younger brother of Fields Medalist Shing-Tung Yau.

After graduating from the Chinese University of Hong Kong, he studied mathematics at the State University of New York at Stony Brook, where he learnt after Henry Laufer and earned his M.A. in 1974 and Ph.D. in 1976.

He was a member of the Institute for Advanced Study at Princeton from 1976 to 1977 and from 1981 to 1982, and was a Benjamin Pierce Assistant Professor at Harvard University from 1977 to 1980. He subsequently taught at the University of Illinois at Chicago for more than 30 years. He was named the UIC Distinguished Professor in 2005.

From 2002 to 2011, Yau also served as the Zi-Jiang Professor at East China Normal University in Shanghai, as well as Director of the university's Institute of Mathematics. After retiring from UIC in 2012, he joined Tsinghua University as a full-time professor.

== Research ==
Among Yau's research interests are bioinformatics, complex algebraic geometry, singularities theory, and nonlinear filtering. He published nearly 300 papers and established the "Yau algebra" and the "Yau number". He served as Chairman of the IEEE International Conference on Control and Information and co-founded the Journal of Algebraic Geometry in 1991. He founded the journal Communications in Information and Systems in 2000, and has served as Editor-in-Chief since its inception.

== Awards ==
Yau was awarded the Sloan Research Fellowship in 1980 and the Guggenheim Fellowship in 2000. He was elected an IEEE Fellow in 2003 and a fellow of the American Mathematical Society in 2013.
