= John Lott (mathematician) =

American mathematician (born 1959)

John W. Lott
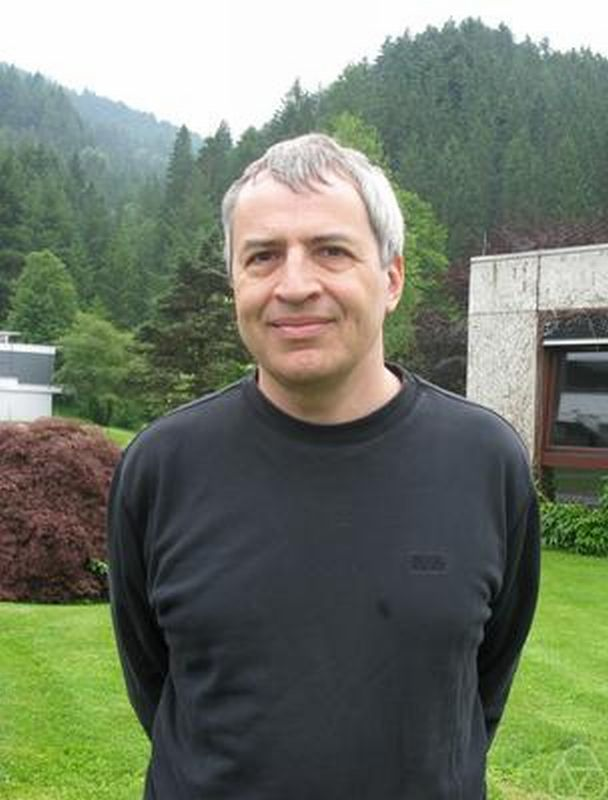
- John Lott in Oberwolfach 2010.
- Born: January 12, 1959 (age 67); Rolla, Missouri
- Education: University of California, Berkeley
- Scientific career
- Fields: Mathematics
- Workplaces: University of California, Berkeley; University of Michigan
- Doctoral advisor: Isadore Singer

John William Lott (born January 12, 1959) is a professor of Mathematics at the University of California, Berkeley. He is known for contributions to differential geometry.

== Academic history ==
Lott received his B.S. from the Massachusetts Institute of Technology in 1978 and M.A. degrees in mathematics and physics from University of California, Berkeley. In 1983, he received a Ph.D. in mathematics under the supervision of Isadore Singer. After postdoctoral positions at Harvard University and the Institut des Hautes Études Scientifiques, he joined the faculty at the University of Michigan. In 2009, he moved to University of California, Berkeley.

Among his awards and honors:

- Sloan Research Fellowship (1989-1991)
- Alexander von Humboldt Fellowship (1991-1992)
- U.S. National Academy of Sciences Award for Scientific Reviewing (with Bruce Kleiner)

== Mathematical contributions ==
A 1985 article of Dominique Bakry and Michel Émery introduced a generalized Ricci curvature, in which one adds to the usual Ricci curvature the hessian of a function. In 2003, Lott showed that much of the standard comparison geometry results for the Ricci tensor extend to the Bakry-Émery setting. For instance, if M is a closed and connected Riemannian manifold with positive Bakry-Émery Ricci tensor, then the fundamental group of M must be finite; if instead the Bakry-Émery Ricci tensor is negative, then the isometry group of the Riemannian manifold must be finite. The comparison geometry of the Bakry-Émery Ricci tensor was taken further in an influential article of Guofang Wei and William Wylie. Additionally, Lott showed that if a Riemannian manifold with smooth density arises as a collapsed limit of Riemannian manifolds with a uniform upper bound on diameter and sectional curvature and a uniform lower bound on Ricci curvature, then the lower bound on Ricci curvature is preserved in the limit as a lower bound on Bakry-Émery's Ricci curvature. In this sense, the Bakry-Émery Ricci tensor is shown to be natural in the context of Riemannian convergence theory.

In 2002 and 2003, Grigori Perelman posted two papers to the arXiv which claimed to provide a proof for William Thurston's geometrization conjecture, using Richard Hamilton's theory of Ricci flow. Perelman's papers attracted immediate attention for their bold claims and the fact that some of their results were quickly verified. However, due to Perelman's abbreviated style of presentation of highly technical material, many mathematicians were unable to understand much of his work, especially in his second paper. Beginning in 2003, Lott and Bruce Kleiner posted a series of annotations of Perelman's work to their websites, which was finalized in a 2008 publication. Their article was most recently updated for corrections in 2013. In 2015, Kleiner and Lott were awarded the Award for Scientific Reviewing from the National Academy of Sciences of the United States for their work. Other well-known expositions of Perelman's work are due to Huai-Dong Cao and Xi-Ping Zhu, and to John Morgan and Gang Tian.

In 2005, Max-K. von Renesse and Karl-Theodor Sturm showed that the lower bound of the Ricci curvature on a Riemannian manifold could be characterized by optimal transportation, in particular by the convexity of a certain "entropy" functional along geodesics of the associated Wasserstein metric space. In 2009, Lott and Cédric Villani capitalized upon this equivalence to define a notion of "lower bound for Ricci curvature" for a general class of metric spaces equipped with Borel measures. Similar work was done at the same time by Sturm, with the accumulated results typically referred to as "Lott-Sturm-Villani theory". The papers of Lott-Villani and Sturm have initiated a very large amount of research in the mathematical literature, much of which is centered around extending classical work on Riemannian geometry to the setting of metric measure spaces. An essentially analogous program for sectional curvature bounds (from either below or above) was initiated in the 1990s by an article of Yuri Burago, Mikhail Gromov, and Grigori Perelman, following foundations laid in the 1950s by Aleksandr Aleksandrov.

== Major publications ==
- Lott, John (2003). "Some geometric properties of the Bakry–Émery–Ricci tensor". Commentarii Mathematici Helvetici. 78 (4): 865–883. doi:10.1007/s00014-003-0775-8. hdl:2027.42/41807. MR 2016700. Zbl 1038.53041.
- Kleiner, Bruce; Lott, John (2008). "Notes on Perelman's papers". Geometry & Topology. 12 (5). Updated for corrections in 2011 & 2013: 2587–2855. arXiv:math/0605667. doi:10.2140/gt.2008.12.2587. MR 2460872. Zbl 1204.53033.
- Lott, John; Villani, Cédric (2009). "Ricci curvature for metric-measure spaces via optimal transport". Annals of Mathematics. Second Series. 169 (3): 903–991. arXiv:math/0412127. doi:10.4007/annals.2009.169.903. MR 2480619. Zbl 1178.53038.
