= Chuan-Chih Hsiung =

Chinese-American mathematician

Chuan-Chih Hsiung (Chinese: 熊全治, Pinyin: Xióng Quánzhì) (1916–2009), also known as Chuan-Chih Hsiung, C C Hsiung, or Xiong Quanzhi, was a Chinese-born American mathematician specializing in differential geometry. He was Professor of Mathematics at Lehigh University, Bethlehem, Pennsylvania, United States.

He was the founder and editor-in-chief of the Journal of Differential Geometry, an influential journal in the domain.

== Life ==
Hsiung was born in Xuefang Village, Xinjian County, Jiangxi on February 15, 1916. He was the third of four children in his family. His early education was taken in Nanchang, the capital city of Jiangxi. He graduated from the National Chekiang University (Zhejiang University) in 1936, and Su Buqing (or Su Buchin) was his main academic advisor.

Forced by the Second Sino-Japanese War, Hsiung moved with the university to Guizhou. Although the war was going on, He kept his study, and focus on Tangrams, which have seven pieces and can change into many different forms. In 1942, in cooperation with others, Hsiung proved that "at most 13 different convex Tangrams can be formed". Hsiung married Wenchin Yu in 1942. They were married for 62 years until she died in 2004. They had one daughter, Nancy. In 1943, V.G. Grove offered Hsiung an assistant position at Michigan State University with generous financial support.

In 1945, after the Japanese surrender, Hsiung was able to go to the US, and obtained his PhD from Michigan State University in 1948. After graduation, Hsiung became an instructor at the same university until 1950. Afterward, he was a visiting lecturer at Northwestern University. Due to Hassler Whitney's invitation from Harvard University, Hsiung became a research assistant there. In Autumn 1952, Hsiung went to the Institute for Advanced Study, Princeton. At Lehigh University, Hsiung became associate professor in 1955, and then rose to full professorship in 1960. Hsiung founded the Journal of Differential Geometry in March 1967. He was Editor-in-Chief of this journal for 42 years, until his death. He retired from teaching in 1984, becoming Professor Emeritus. Hsiung died on May 6, 2009.

== Research ==
During Hsiung's early years, he focused on projective geometry. His interests were largely extended after his research in Harvard, including two-dimensional Riemannian manifolds with boundary, conformal transformation problems, complex manifolds, curvature and characteristic classes, etc.

Minkowski–Hsiung integral formula, or Minkowski-Hsiung formula, is named after him.

== Memorials ==
- Zhejiang University Wenchin Yu Hsiung Scholarship, a scholarship fund, was donated by him and named after his wife Wenchin Yu Hsiung (余文琴).
- C.C. Hsiung Fund for the Advancement of Mathematics of Lehigh University is named after him.

== Books by him ==
- A First Course in Differential Geometry
- Almost Complex and Complex Structures
- Selected Papers of Chuan-Chin Hsiung
