= Jun Li (mathematician) =

Chinese mathematician

- Education: Fudan University (BS, MS); Harvard University (PhD)
- Awards: Morningside Gold Medal of Mathematics (2001)
- Scientific career
- Fields: Mathematics
- Workplaces: Fudan University; Stanford University
- Doctoral advisor: Shing-Tung Yau

Jun Li (Chinese: 李骏) is a Chinese mathematician who is currently a Professor of Mathematics at Fudan University and Professor Emeritus of Mathematics at Stanford University. He focuses primarily on moduli problems in algebraic geometry and their applications to mathematical physics, geometry and topology.

== Education ==
Li graduated from Shanghai Lu Xun High School in 1978. After finishing first in the national high school mathematics competition, he was exempt from the National College Entrance Examination and was directly accepted by Fudan University. He earned his B.S. and M.S. in mathematics from Fudan in 1982 and 1984, respectively. He then earned his Ph.D. from Harvard University in 1989, under the supervision of Shing-Tung Yau.

== Awards ==
Li was an invited speaker at the 1994 ICM. He received a Morningside Gold Medal of Mathematics in 2001 "for his contributions to the study of moduli spaces of vector bundles and to the theory of stable maps and invariants of Calabi-Yau manifolds."
