= Lizhen Ji =

Chinese-American mathematician

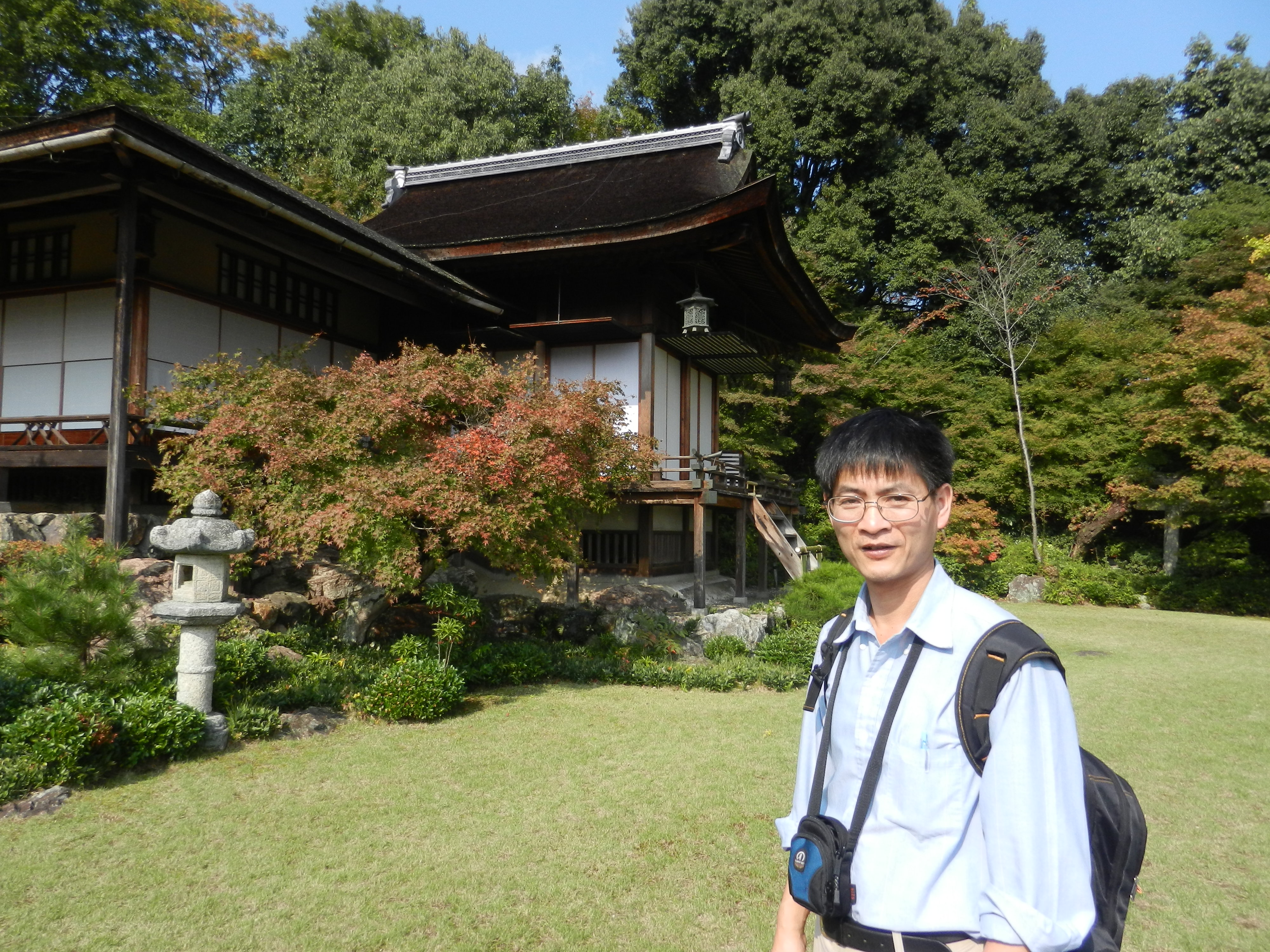
- Lizhen Ji
- Born: 1964 (age 61–62); Wenzhou, Zhejiang, China
- Education: Northeastern University (Ph.D.); University of California, San Diego (M.S.); Hangzhou University (B.S.)
- Awards: Sloan Research Fellow (1998); Silver Morningside Medal (2007); Simons Fellow (2014)
- Scientific career
- Workplaces: Michigan (1995–); Institute for Advanced Study (1994–1995); MIT (1991–1994)
- Thesis: Spectral Degeneration of Riemann Surfaces (1991)
- Doctoral advisor: Mark Goresky; Shing-Tung Yau

Lizhen Ji (Chinese: 季理真; born 1964), is a Chinese American mathematician. He is a professor of mathematics at the University of Michigan.

== Biography ==
In 1964, Ji was born in Wenzhou, Zhejiang Province, China. Ji graduated with a B.S. from Hangzhou University (now Zhejiang University) in Hangzhou in 1984. From 1984 to 1985, Ji was a master student at the Department of Mathematics of Hangzhou University. Ji went to United States to continue his study in 1985, and in 1987 Ji obtained a M.S. from the Department of Mathematics of the University of California, San Diego. In 1991, Ji obtained a Ph.D. from the Northeastern University. His thesis Spectral Degeneration of Riemann Surfaces was advised by R. Mark Goresky and Shing-Tung Yau.

From 1991 to 1994, Ji was C.L.E. Moore instructor at the Department of Mathematics of MIT. From 1994 to 1995, Ji was a member of the Institute for Advanced Study School of Mathematics in Princeton, New Jersey. From 1995 to 1999, Ji was an assistant professor in the Department of Mathematics at the University of Michigan. From 1999 to 2005, Ji was an associate professor in the same department. In 2005, Ji was promoted to full professor at Michigan.

== Awards ==
From 1998 to 2001, Ji was an Alfred P. Sloan Research Fellow. Ji received the Silver Morningside Medal of Mathematics in 2007. Ji was a Simons Fellow in 2014.

== Publications ==
Besides academic papers, Ji has also published or co-written many influential books in mathematics, including:

- Compactifications of Symmetric and Locally Symmetric Spaces; by Armand Borel, and Lizhen Ji.
- Arithmetic Groups and Their Generalizations: What, Why, and How; by Lizhen Ji.
- Geometry, Analysis and Topology of Discrete Groups; co-edited by Lizhen Ji, Kefeng Liu, Yang Lo, and Shing-Tung Yau.
- Compactifications of Symmetric Spaces (Progress in Mathematics, Vol 156); by Y. Guivarc'h, Lizhen Ji, and J. C. Taylor.
- Geometry Analysis and Topology of Discrete Groups; by Lizhen Ji, Kefeng Liu, and Yang Lo.
- Handbook of Geometric Analysis; by Lizhen Ji.
- Mathematics and Mathematical People; Chief-editor Lizhen Ji.
- Advanced Lectures in Mathematics; Chief-editor Lizhen Ji.

== Editorial Work ==
- An editor of the Asian Journal of Mathematics
- An editor of Science in China, Series A: Mathematics
- A founding editor and chief editor of Pure and Applied Mathematics Quarterly
- One of the chief-editors of a book series on Popular Mathematics Mathematics and Humanities
