= Wanxiong Shi =

Chinese mathematician

- 施皖雄
- Born: October 6, 1963; China
- Died: September 30, 2021 (aged 57); Washington D.C., USA
- Education: University of Science and Technology of China; Chinese Academy of Sciences; Harvard University (Ph.D.)
- Scientific career
- Fields: Mathematics
- Workplaces: Purdue University
- Thesis: Ricci Deformation Of The Metric On Complete Noncompact Kahler Manifolds
- Doctoral advisor: Shing-Tung Yau

Wanxiong Shi (Chinese: 施皖雄; pinyin: Shī Wǎnxióng; Pe̍h-ōe-jī: Si Oán-hiông; 6 October 1963 - 30 September 2021) was a Chinese mathematician. He was known for his fundamental work in the theory of Ricci flow.

== Education ==
Shi was a native of Quanzhou, Fujian. In 1978, Shi graduated from Quanzhou No. 5 Middle School, and entered the University of Science and Technology of China. Shi earned his bachelor's degree in mathematics in 1982, then he went to the Institute of Mathematics of Chinese Academy of Sciences and obtained his master's degree in mathematics in 1985 under the guidance of Lu Qikeng (Chinese: 陆启铿) and Zhong Jiaqing (Chinese: 钟家庆). Then Shi was recruited by Shing-Tung Yau to study under him at the University of California, San Diego. In 1987, Shi followed Yau to Harvard University and obtained his Ph.D. there in 1990.

Since Shi was stronger in geometric analysis than other Chinese students, having an impressive ability to carry out highly technical arguments, he was assigned by Yau to investigate Ricci flow in the challenging case of noncompact manifolds. Shi made significant breakthroughs and was highly regarded by researchers in the field. Richard Hamilton, the founder of Ricci flow theory, liked his work very much.

== Academic career and later life ==
Upon his graduation, several prominent universities were interested in offering him a faculty position. Hung-Hsi Wu (Chinese: 伍鸿熙) from the University of California, Berkeley asked Yau if Shi could come to Berkeley. Without seeking opinion from Yau, Shi applied to and got tenure track assistant professorship offers from the University of California, San Diego, where Richard Hamilton was working at, and Purdue University.

Shi decided to join Purdue University. He published several important papers there, and was awarded three grants from the NSF in 1991, 1994 and 1997. However, Shi did not pass the tenure review in 1997, so he had to leave the university. (The principal investigator of the NSF grant of 1997 was changed because of this.) Yau believes that the failure was due to the faculty members not realising the importance of Ricci flow theory. Hamilton sent a belated reference letter to Purdue University in which he rebuked the decision, but to no avail.

Shi then left academia and moved to Washington D.C., where he lived a frugal and secluded life in solitude, and had less and less contact with his friends. He turned down some offers from other universities. Yau and former classmates of Shi tried to persuade Shi and help him return to academia, but he rejected. Yau felt sorry for Shi's leaving academia, since among the four students of Yau who worked on Ricci flow, Shi had done the best work. Shi died from a sudden heart attack in the evening of September 30, 2021.

== Work ==
Shi initiated the study of Ricci flow theory on noncompact complete manifolds. He proved local derivative estimates for the Ricci flow, which are fundamental to many arguments of the theory, including Perelman's proof of the Poincaré conjecture using Ricci flow in 2002.

== Publications ==
- Shi, Wan-Xiong (1989). "Complete noncompact three-manifolds with non-negative Ricci curvature". J. Differ. Geom. 29 (2): 353–360. doi:10.4310/jdg/1214442879.
- Shi, Wan-Xiong (1989). "Deforming the metric on complete Riemannian manifolds". J. Differ. Geom. 30 (1): 223–301. doi:10.4310/jdg/1214443292.
- Shi, Wan-Xiong (1989). "Ricci deformation of the metric on complete non-compact Riemannian manifolds". J. Differ. Geom. 30 (2): 303–394. doi:10.4310/jdg/1214443595.
- Shi, Wan-Xiong (1990). "Complete noncompact Kähler manifolds with positive holomorphic bisectional curvature". Bull. Am. Math. Soc. New Ser. 23 (2): 437–440. doi:10.1090/S0273-0979-1990-15954-3.
- Shi, Wanxiong and Yau, S. T. (1994). "Harmonic maps on complete noncompact Riemannian manifolds". A tribute to Ilya Bakelman. Proceedings of a conference, College Station, TX, USA, October 1993. College Station, TX: Texas A & M University. pp. 79–120. ISBN 0-9630728-2-X.
- Shi, Wan-Xiong and Yau, S.-T. (1996). "A note on the total curvature of a Kähler manifold". Math. Res. Lett. 3 (1): 123–132. doi:10.4310/MRL.1996.v3.n1.a12.
- Shi, Wan-Xiong (1997). "Ricci flow and the uniformization on complete noncompact Kähler manifolds". J. Differ. Geom. 45 (1): 94–220. doi:10.4310/jdg/1214459756.
- Shi, Wan-Xiong (1998). "A uniformization theorem for complete Kähler manifolds with positive holomorphic bisectional curvature". J. Geom. Anal. 8 (1): 117–142. doi:10.1007/BF02922111. S2CID 121610392.
