= Li Shouheng =

Li Shouheng (Chinese: 李寿恒; pinyin: Lǐ Shòuhéng; 1898–1995), also known as S. H. Li, was a Chinese educator, chemist and chemical engineer. Li founded the first chemical engineering department in China, thus is regarded as the Father of Modern Chinese Chemical Engineering. Li is also regarded as the first President of current Zhejiang University of Technology.

== Biography ==
Li was born on 21 Feb 1898 in Yixing, Jiangsu, Qing Dynasty China. Li's courtesy name was Qiaonian (乔年).

Aug 1920, Li went to study in United States. At beginning, Li studied at University of Michigan, Ann Arbor. Later he transferred to the University of Illinois at Urbana-Champaign. In 1923, Li obtained his MS, and PhD in May 1925 under S. W. Parr.

In July 1925, Li went back to China. In early April 1927, Li became a lecturer at Zhejiang Industrial School (one of early roots and technical schools of current comprehensive Zhejiang University). Li founded and led the Department of Chemical Engineering at Zhejiang University, which is the first chemical engineering department in China. The first BEng of Chemical Engineering students graduated from his department in 1928.

In May 1938, Li was designated the acting dean of the engineering faculty of Zhejiang University, by then university president Coching Chu. In Aug 1947, Li became the Provost of Zhejiang University. In 1950, Li became the head of Zhejiang University School of Engineering. In 1952, Li was repointed as the Provost of Zhejiang University, by the Ministry of Education of the People's Republic of China Central Government. From 1956 to 1958, Li was the Vice-president of Zhejiang University.

Later, the new Zhejiang Chemical Engineering School (the pre-existence of current Zhejiang University of Technology) was established, mainly based on the technical resources of Zhejiang University. Li was pointed as the president of the school, thus nowadays Li is also regarded as the first President of the Zhejiang University of Technology.

Li died on 18 Feb 1995 in Hangzhou.
