= Paul Thompson (neuroscientist) =

British-American neuroscientist (born 1971)

- Born: 13 June 1971 (age 55)
- Education: Oxford University; University of California, Los Angeles
- Known for: ENIGMA Project
- Scientific career
- Fields: Neuroscience
- Workplaces: University of Southern California
- Website: USC/Paul Thompson

Paul Thompson (born 13 June 1971) is a British-American neuroscientist, and a professor of neurology at the Imaging Genetics Center at the University of Southern California. Thompson obtained a bachelor's degree in Greek and Latin languages and mathematics from Oxford University. He also earned a master's degree in mathematics from Oxford and a PhD degree in neuroscience from University of California, Los Angeles.

Thompson specializes in the field of human brain imaging, with research interest in mathematical and computational algorithm development for human brain mapping, and has contributed to more than 900 publications. He currently leads the Enhancing Neuro Imaging Genetics through Meta-Analysis (ENIGMA) project, a global data collection and sharing effort designed to understand how brain structure changes during the trajectory of brain atrophy, mental illness and Alzheimer's disease and the underlying genetic landscape.

== Research ==
The ENIGMA Consortium, co-founded by Thompson, performs some of the largest-ever studies of the human brain, analyzing brain scans of more than 50,000 people worldwide. This collaborative group studies 22 brain diseases in 37 countries, focusing on the interaction between brain health and genetics. ENIGMA has published some of the largest-ever neuroimaging studies of schizophrenia, major depression, bipolar disorder, epilepsy, autism spectrum disorder, and obsessive–compulsive disorder.

In 2020, Thompson launched AI4AD, a consortium of researchers across the United States that aims to develop AI tools to analyze and integrate genetic, imaging and cognitive data relating to Alzheimer’s disease.

In 2023, Thompson launched the India ENIGMA Initiative, a study of factors that affect brain aging and mental health in India.

== Academic career ==
Thompson began his academic career as an assistant professor of neurology at the University of California, Los Angeles (UCLA), after completing his PhD in neuroscience as a Fulbright Scholar at UCLA. During his time at UCLA, Thompson was promoted to professor in 2010.

In 2013, Thompson moved to the University of Southern California (USC), where he was named director of the USC Imaging Genetics Center and associate director of the USC Mark and Mary Stevens Neuroimaging and Informatics Institute. He is also a professor in the Keck School of Medicine of USC departments of ophthalmology, neurology, psychiatry and the behavioral sciences, radiology and engineering, and holds the Popovich Chair in Neurodegenerative Diseases.

== Awards ==
- In 2023, Thompson received the 2023 Pioneer in Medicine Award from the Society for Brain Mapping and Therapeutics.
- In 2025, Thompson received the Gold Medal Award from the Society of Biological Psychiatry, recognizing his pioneering work in neuroimaging and the development of global collaborative research initiatives in biological psychiatry.
- In May 2025, Thompson was elected as a Foreign Member of the Russian Academy of Sciences, an honor bestowed upon select international scientists for their significant contributions to global scientific advancement.
- In 2025, Thompson was selected to deliver the prestigious Talairach Lecture at the Organization for Human Brain Mapping (OHBM) Annual Meeting, recognizing his leading contributions to neuroimaging and artificial intelligence in brain research.

== Impact ==
Thompson has been named one of “the world’s most influential scientific minds” and a highly cited researcher by Thomson Reuters. In March 2022, he was ranked as the number 181 most cited researcher worldwide based on his whole career h-index of 188 (based on Google Scholar).
