= Journal of Differential Geometry =

- Discipline: Differential geometry
- Language: English, French, German, Italian
- Edited by: Shing-Tung Yau

Publication details
- History: 1967-present
- Publisher: International Press on behalf of Lehigh University (United States)
- Frequency: 9 issues per year
- Impact factor: 2.04 (2014)

Standard abbreviations
- ISO 4: J. Differ. Geom.
- MathSciNet: J. Differential Geom.

Indexing
- CODEN: JDGEAS
- ISSN: 0022-040X (print); 1945-743X (web)
- LCCN: 74648086
- OCLC no.: 1796299

Links
- Journal homepage; Online access; Online archive; Journal page at Lehigh University

The Journal of Differential Geometry is a peer-reviewed scientific journal of mathematics published by International Press on behalf of Lehigh University in 3 volumes of 3 issues each per year. The journal publishes an annual supplement in book form called Surveys in Differential Geometry. It covers differential geometry and related subjects such as differential equations, mathematical physics, algebraic geometry, and geometric topology. The editor-in-chief is Shing-Tung Yau of Harvard University.

== History ==
The journal was established in 1967 by Chuan-Chih Hsiung, who was a professor in the Department of Mathematics at Lehigh University at the time. Hsiung served as the journal's editor-in-chief, and later co-editor-in-chief, until his death in 2009.

In May 1996, the annual Geometry and Topology conference which was held at Harvard University was dedicated to commemorating the 30th anniversary of the journal and the 80th birthday of its founder. Similarly, in May 2008 Harvard held a conference dedicated to the 40th anniversary of the Journal of Differential Geometry.

== Reception ==
In his 2005 book Mathematical Publishing: A Guidebook, Steven Krantz writes: "At some very prestigious journals, like the Annals of Mathematics or the Journal of Differential Geometry, the editorial board meets every couple of months and debates each paper in detail."

The journal is abstracted and indexed in MathSciNet, Zentralblatt MATH, Current Contents/Physical, Chemical & Earth Sciences, and the Science Citation Index. According to the Journal Citation Reports, the journal has a 2013 impact factor of 1.093.
