= Zhu Xiping =

Chinese mathematician (born 1962)

- Chinese: 朱熹平
Transcriptions
Standard Mandarin
- Hanyu Pinyin: Zhū Xīpíng
- Wade–Giles: Chu^{1} Hsi^{1}-P'ing^{2}

Zhu Xiping (born 1962 in Shixing, Guangdong) is a Chinese mathematician. He is a professor of Mathematics at Sun Yat-sen University, China.

== Poincaré conjecture ==
In 2002 and 2003, Grigori Perelman posted three preprints to the arXiv claiming a resolution of the renowned Poincaré conjecture, along with the more general geometrization conjecture. His work contained a number of notable new results on the Ricci flow, although many proofs were only sketched and a number of details were unaddressed. Zhu collaborated with Huai-Dong Cao of Lehigh University in filling in the details of Perelman's work, along with reworking various elements. Their work, containing expositions of Perelman's work along with the foundational work of Richard Hamilton, was published in the June 2006 issue of the Asian Journal of Mathematics. Other notable expositions were released around the same time, one by John Morgan of Columbia University and Gang Tian of Princeton University, and the other by Bruce Kleiner of Yale University and John Lott of University of Michigan.

Cao and Zhu later posted a version with revised wording to the arxiv, following criticism alleging that their original version claimed too much credit for themselves. They also published an erratum, as it had been found that one of the pages of their work was essentially identical to a page from a publicly available draft of Kleiner and Lott from 2003. They explained that they had taken down some notes from Kleiner and Lott's paper. When writing their exposition, they had failed to realize these particular notes' original source.

== Morningside Medal ==
In December 2004, Zhu won the Morningside Medal of Mathematics at the Third International Congress of Chinese Mathematicians (ICCM), a triennial congress hosted by institutions in Mainland China, Taiwan, and Hong Kong on a rotating basis. According to ICCM, "Awardees (of the Morningside Medal) are selected by a panel of international renowned mathematicians with the aim to encourage outstanding mathematicians of Chinese descent in their pursuit of mathematical truth."

== Major publications ==
- Cao, Huai-Dong; Zhu, Xi-Ping (2006). "A complete proof of the Poincaré and geometrization conjectures—application of the Hamilton–Perelman theory of the Ricci flow". Asian Journal of Mathematics. 10 (2): 165–492. doi:10.4310/ajm.2006.v10.n2.a2. MR 2233789. Zbl 1200.53057.
  – – (2006). "Erratum". Asian Journal of Mathematics. 10 (4): 663–664. doi:10.4310/AJM.2006.v10.n4.e2. MR 2282358.
  – – (2006). "Hamilton–Perelman's Proof of the Poincaré Conjecture and the Geometrization Conjecture". arXiv:math/0612069.
