= Kefeng Liu =

Chinese-American mathematician

- 刘克峰
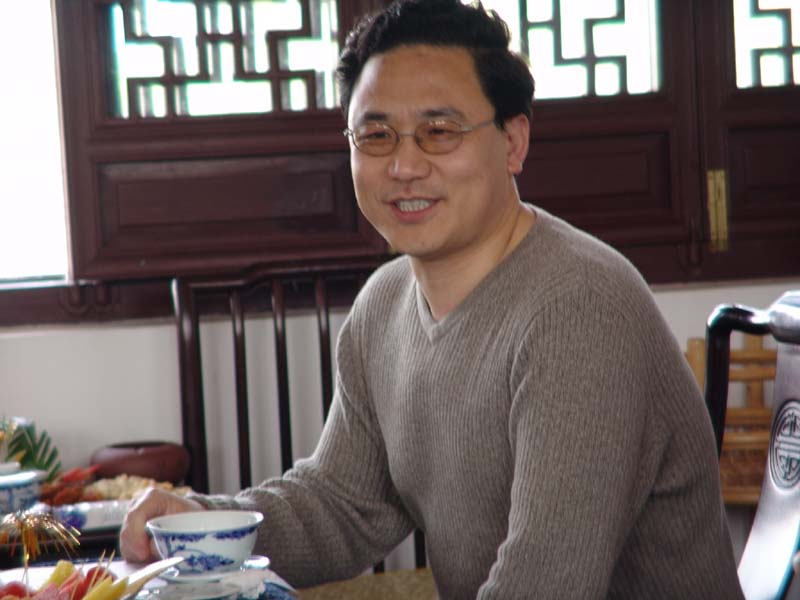
- Kefeng Liu at Hangzhou in 2004
- Born: 12 December 1965 (age 60); Kaifeng, Henan, China
- Citizenship: United States
- Education: Peking University (BA); Chinese Academy of Sciences (MA); Harvard University (PhD)
- Awards: Morningside Gold Medal (2004); Guggenheim Fellow (2002)
- Scientific career
- Fields: Mathematics
- Workplaces: Massachusetts Institute of Technology; Zhejiang University; University of California, Los Angeles
- Doctoral advisor: Shing-Tung Yau

Kefeng Liu (Chinese: 刘克峰; born 12 December 1965), is a Chinese-American mathematician who is known for his contributions to geometric analysis, particularly the geometry, topology and analysis of moduli spaces of Riemann surfaces and Calabi–Yau manifolds. He is a professor of mathematics at University of California, Los Angeles, as well as the executive director of the Center of Mathematical Sciences at Zhejiang University. He is best known for his collaboration with Bong Lian and Shing-Tung Yau in which they establish some enumerative geometry conjectures motivated by mirror symmetry.

== Biography ==
Liu was born in Kaifeng, Henan province, China. In 1985, Liu received his B.A. in mathematics from the Department of Mathematics of Peking University in Beijing. In 1988, Liu obtained his M.A. from the Institute of Mathematics of the Chinese Academy of Sciences (CAS) in Beijing. Liu then went to study in the United States, obtaining a Ph.D. from Harvard University in 1993 under Shing-Tung Yau.

From 1993 to 1996, Liu was C. L. E. Moore Instructor at the Massachusetts Institute of Technology. From 1996 to 2000, Liu was an assistant professor at Stanford University. Liu joined the University of California, Los Angeles faculty in 2000, where he was promoted to full professor in 2002. In September 2003, Liu was appointed as the head of Zhejiang University's mathematics department. Liu is currently the executive director of the Center of Mathematical Sciences at Zhejiang University.

== Awards and honors ==
- Frederick E. Terman Fellow (1997-2001)
- Sloan Fellowship (1998-2001)
- Guggenheim Fellow (2002)
- Silver Morningside Medal (1998)
- Morningside Gold Medal in Mathematics (2004)
- invited speaker, 2002 International Congress of Mathematicians

== Editorial Work ==
- Communications in Analysis and Geometry, Editor-in-Chief
- Pure and Applied Mathematical Quarterly, Co-Editor-in-Chief.
- Asian Journal of Mathematics, Editor.
- Pacific Journal of Mathematics, Editor.
- Notices of the International Congress of Chinese Mathematicians, Co-Editor-in-Chief.
- Advanced Lectures in Mathematics, Executive Editor.
- Science China Mathematics, Editor.
- Mathematics and Humanities, Co-Editor-in-Chief.
