= Dominique Bakry =

French mathematician

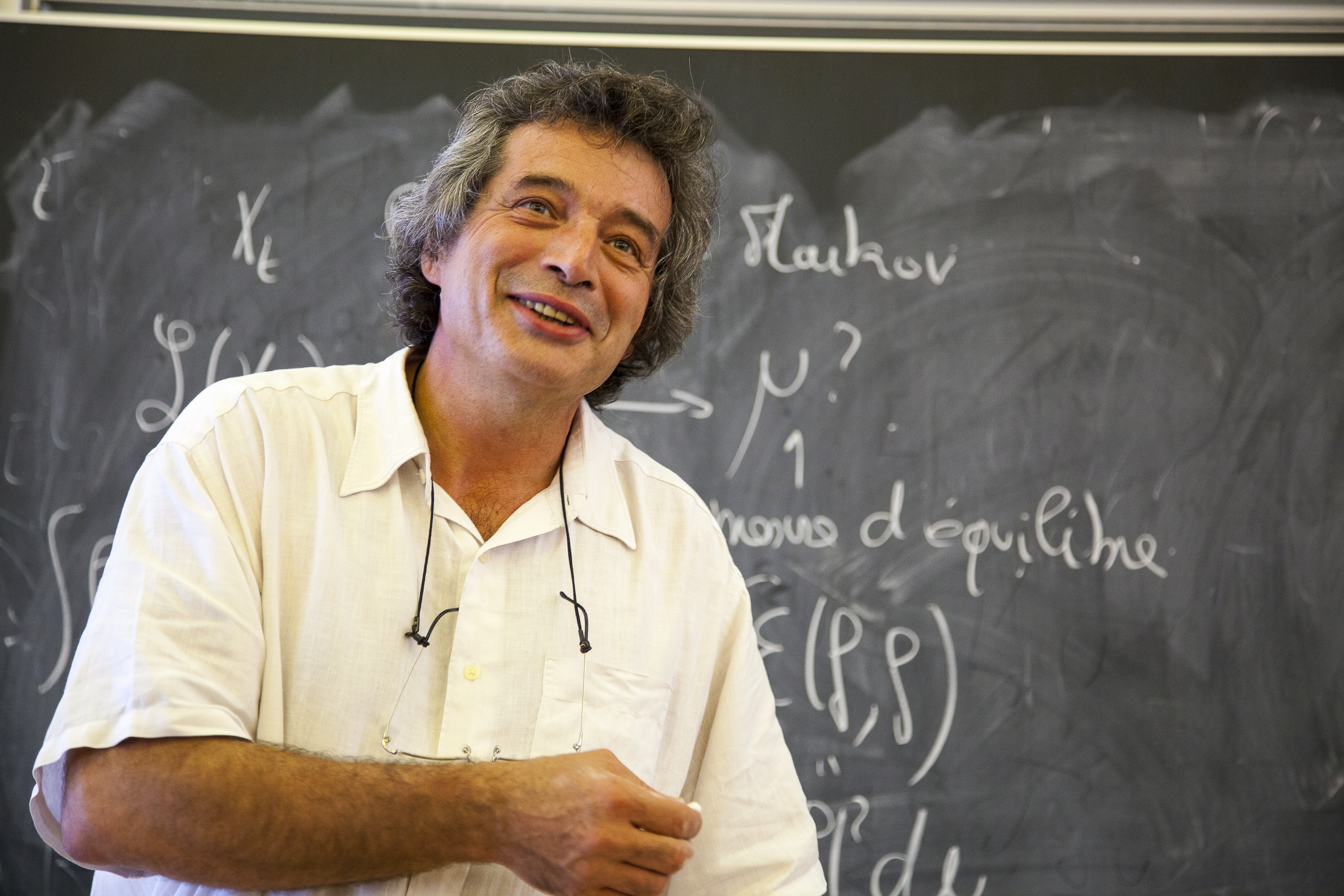
Dominique Bakry (2009).

Roger-Dominique Bakry (born 12 December 1954), known as Dominique Bakry, is a French mathematician, a professor at the Université Paul-Sabatier in Toulouse, and a senior member of Institut Universitaire de France.

Bakry graduated from ENS Saint-Cloud, and prepared his PhD under the advisory of Paul-André Meyer and Marc Yor. Before coming to Toulouse, he was chargé de recherches at CNRS in Université Louis Pasteur of Strasbourg. His scientific work is at the interface of Analysis, Probability, and Geometry. His most influential works concern Riesz transforms and Markov semigroups. He gave his name to the Bakry-Émery criterion, developed in collaboration with Michel Émery and published in 1984, and linked more generally to the curvature-dimension criterion.
