= Alexander Givental =

Russian American mathematician

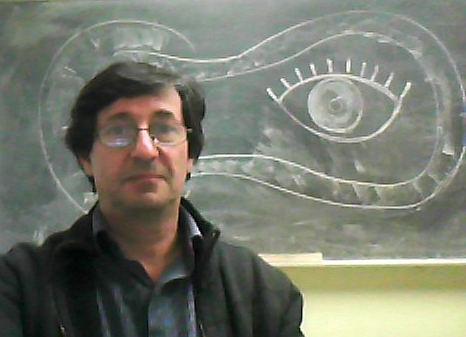
- Born: April 27, 1958 (age 68); Moscow, Soviet Union
- Education: Gubkin Russian State University of Oil and Gas
- Known for: Arnold–Givental conjecture
- Scientific career
- Fields: Mathematics
- Workplaces: University of California, Berkeley
- Thesis: Singularities of Solutions of Hamilton-Jacobi Equations in Variational Problems with Inequality Constraints (1987)
- Doctoral advisor: Vladimir Arnold

Alexander Givental (Russian: Александр Борисович Гивенталь) is a Russian-American mathematician. He is currently Professor of Mathematics at the University of California, Berkeley. His main contributions have been in symplectic topology and singularity theory, as well as their relation to topological string theories.

== Career ==
Givental graduated from Moscow high school No. 2 (Лицей «Вторая школа»), where one of the math teachers was Valery Senderov. He was not able to enter a program at a top university because of antisemitism in Soviet mathematics. He completed his undergraduate and master studies at the Gubkin Russian State University of Oil and Gas, and defended his PhD under the supervision of V. I. Arnold in 1987.

Givental emigrated to the United States in 1990. He was a speaker at the 1994 International Congress of Mathematicians in Zurich. He provided the first proof of the mirror conjecture for Calabi–Yau manifolds that are complete intersections in toric ambient spaces, in particular for quintic hypersurfaces in P^{4}.

Givental publishes books, including his own translation of a textbook (Элементарная геометрия (Киселёв)) in geometry by Andrey Kiselyov.

== Personal life ==
Givental has two children. He translates Russian poetry, by Marina Tsvetaeva and other authors, into English.
