= Asian Journal of Mathematics =

The Asian Journal of Mathematics
- Discipline: Mathematics
- Language: English
- Edited by: Shing-Tung Yau, Raymond Chan

Publication details
- History: 1997–present
- Publisher: International Press
- Frequency: Quarterly
- Impact factor: 0.362 (2009)

Standard abbreviations
- ISO 4: Asian J. Math.

Indexing
- ISSN: 1093-6106

Links
- Journal homepage

The Asian Journal of Mathematics is a peer-reviewed scientific journal covering all areas of pure and theoretical applied mathematics. It is published by International Press.
