= Gauss curvature flow =

In the mathematical fields of differential geometry and geometric analysis, the Gauss curvature flow is a geometric flow for oriented hypersurfaces of Riemannian manifolds. In the case of curves in a two-dimensional manifold, it is identical with the curve shortening flow. The mean curvature flow is a different geometric flow which also has the curve shortening flow as a special case.

== Definition and well-posedness ==
Let S be a smooth n-dimensional manifold and let (M, g) be a smooth Riemannian manifold of dimension n + 1. Given an immersion f of S into M together with a unit normal vector field along f, the second fundamental form of f can be viewed as a symmetric 2-tensor field on S. Via the first fundamental form, it can also be viewed as a (1,1)-tensor field on S, where it is known as the shape operator. The Gaussian curvature or Gauss–Kronecker curvature of f, denoted by K, can then be defined as the point-by-point determinant of the shape operator, or equivalently (relative to local coordinates) as the determinant of the second fundamental form divided by the determinant of the first fundamental form.

The equation defining the Gauss curvature flow is

$$\frac{\partial F}{\partial t}=-K\nu.$$

So a Gauss curvature flow consists of a smooth manifold S, a smooth Riemannian manifold M of dimension one larger, and a one-parameter family of immersions of S into M, together with a smooth unit normal vector field along each immersion, such that the above equation is satisfied.

The well-posedness of the Gauss curvature flow is settled if S is closed. Then, if n is greater than one, and if a given immersion, along which a smooth unit normal vector field has been chosen, has positive-definite second fundamental form, then there is a unique solution of the Gauss curvature flow with "initial data" f. If n is equal to one, so that one is in the setting of the curve shortening flow, the condition on the second fundamental form is unnecessary.

== Convergence theorems ==
Due to the existence & uniqueness theorem above, the Gauss curvature flow has essentially only been studied in the cases of curve shortening flow, and in higher dimensions for closed convex hypersurfaces. Regardless of dimension, it has been most widely studied in the case that (M, g) is the Euclidean space ℝ^{n + 1}.

In the case of curve shortening flow, Michael Gage and Richard Hamilton showed that any convex embedding of the circle into the plane is deformed to a point in finite time, in such a way that rescalings of the curves in the flow smoothly approach a round circle. This was enhanced by a result of Matthew Grayson showing that any embedded circle in the plane is deformed into a convex embedding, at which point Gage and Hamilton's result applies. Proofs have since been found which do not treat the two cases of convexity and non-convexity separately. In the more general setting of a complete two-dimensional Riemannian manifold which has a certain convexity near infinity, Grayson proved the convergence to a closed geodesic or to a round point.

Kaising Tso applied the methods of Shiu-Yuen Cheng and Shing-Tung Yau's resolution of the Minkowski problem to study the higher-dimensional version of Gage and Hamilton's result. In particular, he cast the Gauss curvature flow as a parabolic Monge–Ampère equation for the support function of the hypersurfaces. He was able to show that the maximal time of existence is an explicit constant multiple of the volume enclosed by the initial hypersurface, and that each hypersurface in the flow is smooth and strictly convex, with diameter converging to zero as the time approaches its maximum.

In 1999, Ben Andrews succeeded in proving the well-known Firey conjecture, showing that for convex surfaces in ℝ^{3}, the surfaces in Tso's result could be rescaled to smoothly converge to a round sphere. The key of his proof was an application of the maximum principle to the quantity H^{2} − 4K, showing that the largest size of the point-by-point difference of the two eigenvalues of the shape operator cannot be increasing in time. Previous results of Andrews for convex hypersurfaces of Euclidean space, as well as a Li–Yau Harnack inequality found by Bennett Chow, then applied to obtain uniform geometric control over the surfaces comprising the flow. The full convergence to the sphere made use of the Krylov–Safonov theorem.

== Sources ==
- Andrews, Ben (1994). "Contraction of convex hypersurfaces in Euclidean space". Calculus of Variations and Partial Differential Equations. 2 (2): 151–171. doi:10.1007/BF01191340. MR 1385524. Zbl 0805.35048.
- Andrews, Ben (1999). "Gauss curvature flow: the fate of the rolling stones". Inventiones Mathematicae. 138 (1): 151–161. doi:10.1007/s002220050344. MR 1714339. Zbl 0936.35080.
- Andrews, Ben; Chow, Bennett; Guenther, Christine; Langford, Mat (2020). Extrinsic Geometric Flows. Graduate Studies in Mathematics. Vol. 206. Providence, RI: American Mathematical Society. doi:10.1090/gsm/206. ISBN 978-1-4704-5596-5. MR 4249616. Zbl 1475.53002.
- Gage, M.; Hamilton, R. S. (1986). "The heat equation shrinking convex plane curves". Journal of Differential Geometry. 23 (1): 69–96. doi:10.4310/jdg/1214439902. MR 0840401. Zbl 0621.53001.
- Grayson, Matthew A. (1987). "The heat equation shrinks embedded plane curves to round points". Journal of Differential Geometry. 26 (2): 285–314. doi:10.4310/jdg/1214441371. MR 0906392. Zbl 0667.53001.
- Grayson, Matthew A. (1989). "Shortening embedded curves". Annals of Mathematics. Second Series. 129 (1): 71–111. doi:10.2307/1971486. MR 0979601. Zbl 0686.53036.
- Huisken, Gerhard; Polden, Alexander (1999). "Geometric evolution equations for hypersurfaces". In Hildebrandt, S.; Struwe, M. (eds.). Calculus of Variations and Geometric Evolution Problems. Second Session of the Centro Internazionale Matematico Estivo (Cetraro, Italy, June 15–22, 1996). Lecture Notes in Mathematics. Vol. 1713. Berlin: Springer. pp. 45–84. doi:10.1007/BFb0092667. MR 1731639. Zbl 0942.35047.
- Tso, Kaising (1985). "Deforming a hypersurface by its Gauss–Kronecker curvature". Communications on Pure and Applied Mathematics. 38 (6): 867–882. doi:10.1002/cpa.3160380615. MR 0812353. Zbl 0612.53005.
