= Extrinsic Geometric Flows =

Geometry textbook

- First edition
- Author: Ben Andrews, Bennett Chow, Christine Guenther, and Mat Langford
- Language: English
- Series: Graduate Studies in Mathematics
- Genre: Mathematics
- Publisher: American Mathematical Society
- Publication date: 2020

Extrinsic Geometric Flows is an advanced mathematics textbook that overviews geometric flows, mathematical problems in which a curve or surface moves continuously according to some rule. It focuses on extrinsic flows, in which the rule depends on the embedding of a surface into space, rather than intrinsic flows such as the Ricci flow that depend on the internal geometry of the surface and can be defined without respect to an embedding.

Extrinsic Geometric Flows was written by Ben Andrews, Bennett Chow, Christine Guenther, and Mat Langford, and published in 2020 as volume 206 of Graduate Studies in Mathematics, a book series of the American Mathematical Society.

== Topics ==
The book consists of four chapters, roughly divided into four sections:

- Chapters 1 through 4 concern the heat equation and the curve-shortening flow defined from it, in which a curve moves in the Euclidean plane, perpendicularly to itself, at a speed proportional to its curvature. It includes material on curves that remain self-similar as they flow, such as circles and the grim reaper curve $y=-\log\cos x$, the Gage–Hamilton–Grayson theorem according to which every simple closed curve converges to a circle until eventually collapsing to a point, without ever self-intersecting, and the classification of ancient solutions of the flow.
- Chapters 5 through 14 concern the mean curvature flow, a higher dimensional generalization of the curve-shortening flow that uses the mean curvature of a surface to control the speed of its perpendicular motion. After an introductory chapter on the geometry of hypersurfaces, It includes results of Ecker and Huisken concerning "locally Lipschitz entire graphs", and Huisken's theorem that uniformly convex surfaces remain smooth and convex, converging to a sphere, before they collapse to a point. Huisken's monotonicity formula is covered, as are the regularity theorems of Brakke and White according to which the flow is almost-everywhere smooth. Several chapters in this section concern the singularities that can develop in this flow, as well as the surfaces that remain self-similar as they flow.
- Chapters 15 through 17 concern the Gauss curvature flow, a different way of generalizing the curve-shortening flow to higher dimensions using Gaussian curvature in place of mean curvature. Although Gaussian curvature is intrinsic, unlike mean curvature, the Gauss curvature flow is extrinsic, because it involves the motion of an embedded surface. Here, variations of the flow involve using a power of the curvature, rather than the curvature itself, to define the speed of the flow, and this raises questions concerning the existence of the flow over finite time intervals, the existence of self-similar solutions, and limiting shapes. The exponent of the curvature is critical here, with convex surfaces converging to an ellipsoid at exponent $\tfrac{1}{d+2}$ (generalizing the affine curve-shortening flow) and to a round sphere for larger exponents.
- Chapters 18-20 provide a broader panorama of nonlinear geometric flows.

The content within each chapter includes both proofs of the results discussed in the chapter, and references to the mathematics literature; additional references are provided in a commentary section at the end of each chapter, which also provides additional intuition and descriptions of open problems, as well as brief descriptions of additional results in the same area. As well as illustrating the mathematics under discussion with many figures, it humanizes the content by providing photographs of many of the mathematicians that it references. The chapters include exercises, making this book suitable as a graduate textbooks.

== Audience and reception ==
Although intrinsic flows have been the subject of much recent attention in mathematics after their use by Grigori Perelman to solve both the Poincaré conjecture and the geometrization conjecture, extrinsic flows also have a long history of important applications in mathematics, closely related to the solutions of partial differential equations. Their uses include modeling the growth of biological cells, metallic crystal grains, bubbles in foams, and even "the deformation of rolling stones in a beach".

The book's proofs are often simplifications of the proofs in the research literature, but nevertheless it still quite technical, aimed at graduate students and researchers in geometric analysis. Readers are expected to be familiar with the basics of differential geometry and partial differential equations. There is more material in the book than could be covered in a single course, but it could either form the basis of a multi-course sequence or a topics course that picks out only some of its material. As well as being a textbook, Extrinsic Geometric Flows can serve as reference material on flows for specialists in the area.

== Related works ==
This is not the first book on geometric flows. Others include:

- Chou, Kai-Seng; Zhu, Xi-Ping (2001), The Curve Shortening Problem, Chapman & Hall/CRC, doi:10.1201/9781420035704, ISBN 1-58488-213-1, MR 1888641
- Zhu, Xi-Ping (2002), Lectures on Mean Curvature Flows, AMS/IP Studies in Advanced Mathematics, vol. 32, International Press, doi:10.1090/amsip/032, ISBN 0-8218-3311-1, MR 1931534
- Ecker, Klaus (2004), Regularity Theory for Mean Curvature Flow, Progress in Nonlinear Differential Equations and their Applications, vol. 57, Birkhäuser, doi:10.1007/978-0-8176-8210-1, ISBN 0-8176-3243-3, MR 2024995
- Giga, Yoshikazu (2006), Surface Evolution Equations: A Level Set Approach, Monographs in Mathematics, vol. 99, Birkhäuser, ISBN 978-3-7643-2430-8, MR 2238463

Although Extrinsic Geometric Flows is more comprehensive and up-to-date than these works, it omits some of their topics, including anisotropic flows of curves in Chou & Zhu (2001), applications to the theory of relativity in Zhu (2002), and the level-set methods of Giga (2006).
