= Angenent torus =

In differential geometry, the Angenent torus is a smooth embedding of the torus into three-dimensional Euclidean space, with the property that it remains self-similar as it evolves under the mean curvature flow. Its existence shows that, unlike the one-dimensional curve-shortening flow (for which every embedded closed curve converges to a circle as it shrinks to a point), the two-dimensional mean-curvature flow has embedded surfaces that form more complex singularities as they collapse.

== History ==
The Angenent torus is named after Sigurd Angenent, who published a proof that it exists in 1992. However, as early as 1990, Gerhard Huisken wrote that Matthew Grayson had told him of "numerical evidence" of its existence.

== Existence ==
To prove the existence of the Angenent torus, Angenent first posits that it should be a surface of revolution. Any such surface can be described by its cross-section, a curve on a half-plane (where the boundary line of the half-plane is the axis of revolution of the surface). Following ideas of Huisken, Angenent defines a Riemannian metric on the half-plane, with the property that the geodesics for this metric are exactly the cross-sections of surfaces of revolution that remain self-similar and collapse to the origin after one unit of time. This metric is highly non-uniform, but it has a reflection symmetry, whose symmetry axis is the half-line that passes through the origin perpendicularly to the boundary of the half-plane.

By considering the behavior of geodesics that pass perpendicularly through this axis of reflectional symmetry, at different distances from the origin, and applying the intermediate value theorem, Angenent finds a geodesic that passes through the axis perpendicularly at a second point. This geodesic and its reflection join up to form a simple closed geodesic for the metric on the half-plane. When this closed geodesic is used to make a surface of revolution, it forms the Angenent torus.

Other geodesics lead to other surfaces of revolution that remain self-similar under the mean-curvature flow, including spheres, cylinders, planes, and (according to numerical evidence but not rigorous proof) immersed topological spheres with multiple self-crossings. Kleene & Møller (2014) prove that the only complete smooth embedded surfaces of rotation that stay self-similar under the mean curvature flow are planes, cylinders, spheres, and topological tori. They conjecture more strongly that the Angenent torus is the only torus with this property.

== Applications ==
The Angenent torus can be used to prove the existence of certain other kinds of singularities of the mean curvature flow. For instance, if a dumbbell shaped surface, consisting of a thin cylindrical "neck" connecting two large volumes, can have its neck surrounded by a disjoint Angenent torus, then the two surfaces of revolution will remain disjoint under the mean curvature flow until one of them reaches a singularity; if the ends of the dumbbell are large enough, this implies that the neck must pinch off, separating the two spheres from each other, before the torus surrounding the neck collapses.

== Related shapes ==
Any shape that stays self-similar but shrinks under the mean curvature flow forms an ancient solution to the flow, one that can be extrapolated backwards for all time. However, the reverse is not true. In the same paper in which he published the Angenent torus, Angenent also described the Angenent ovals; these are not self-similar, but they are the only simple closed curves in the plane, other than a circle, that give ancient solutions to the curve-shortening flow.
