= Angenent =

Angenent is a surname. Notable people with the surname include:

- Henk Angenent (born 1967), Dutch speed skater
- Sigurd Angenent (born 1960), Dutch-born American mathematician and professor
  - Angenent torus
