= Sphericity =

Measure of how closely a shape resembles a sphere

Schematic representation of difference in grain shape. Two parameters are shown: sphericity (vertical) and rounding (horizontal).

Sphericity is a measure of how closely the shape of a physical object resembles that of a perfect sphere. For example, the sphericity of the balls inside a ball bearing determines the quality of the bearing, such as the load it can bear or the speed at which it can turn without failing. Sphericity is a specific example of a compactness measure of a shape.

Sphericity applies in three dimensions; its analogue in two dimensions, such as the cross sectional circles along a cylindrical object such as a shaft, is called roundness.

== Definition ==
Defined by Wadell in 1935, the sphericity, $\Psi$, of an object is the ratio of the surface area of a sphere with the same volume to the object's surface area:

$$\Psi = \frac{\pi^{\frac{1}{3}}(6V_p)^{\frac{2}{3}}}{A_p}$$

where $V_p$ is volume of the object and $A_p$ is the surface area. The sphericity of a sphere is unity by definition and, by the isoperimetric inequality, any shape which is not a sphere will have sphericity less than 1.

== Ellipsoidal objects ==
The sphericity, $\Psi$, of an oblate spheroid (similar to the shape of the planet Earth) is:

$\Psi = \frac{\pi^{\frac{1}{3}}(6V_p)^{\frac{2}{3}}}{A_p} = \frac{2\sqrt[3]{ab^2}}{a+\frac{b^2}{\sqrt{a^2-b^2}}\ln{\left(\frac{a+\sqrt{a^2-b^2}}b\right)}},$

where a and b are the semi-major and semi-minor axes respectively.

== Derivation ==
Hakon Wadell defined sphericity as the surface area of a sphere of the same volume as the object divided by the actual surface area of the object.

First we need to write surface area of the sphere, $A_s$ in terms of the volume of the object being measured, $V_p$

$$A_{s}^3 = \left(4 \pi r^2\right)^3 = 4^3 \pi^3 r^6 = 4 \pi \left(4^2 \pi^2 r^6\right) = 4 \pi \cdot 3^2 \left(\frac{4^2 \pi^2}{3^2} r^6\right) = 36 \pi \left(\frac{4 \pi}{3} r^3\right)^2 = 36\,\pi V_{p}^2$$

therefore

$$A_{s} = \left(36\,\pi V_{p}^2\right)^{\frac{1}{3}} = 36^{\frac{1}{3}} \pi^{\frac{1}{3}} V_{p}^{\frac{2}{3}} = 6^{\frac{2}{3}} \pi^{\frac{1}{3}} V_{p}^{\frac{2}{3}} = \pi^{\frac{1}{3}} \left(6V_{p}\right)^{\frac{2}{3}}$$

hence we define $\Psi$ as:

$$\Psi = \frac{A_s}{A_p} = \frac{ \pi^{\frac{1}{3}} \left(6V_{p}\right)^{\frac{2}{3}} }{A_{p}}$$

== Sphericity of common objects ==
Name	Picture	Volume	Surface area	Sphericity
Sphere		$\frac{4\pi}{3}\,r^3$	$4\pi\,r^2$	$1$
Disdyakis triacontahedron		$\frac{900+720\sqrt{5}}{11}\,s^3$	$\frac{180\sqrt{179-24\sqrt{5}}}{11}\,s^2$	$\frac{\left(\left(5+4\sqrt{5}\right)^{2}\frac{11\pi}{5}\right)^{\frac{1}{3}}}{\sqrt{179-24\sqrt{5}}}\approx0.9857$
Tricylinder		$16-8\sqrt{2}\,r^3$	$48-24\sqrt{2}\,r^2$	$\frac{\sqrt[3]{36\pi+18\pi\sqrt{2}}}{6}\approx0.9633$
Rhombic triacontahedron		$4\sqrt{5+2\sqrt{5}}\,s^3$	$12\sqrt{5}\,s^2$	$\frac{\sqrt[6]{455625\pi^{2}+202500\pi^{2}\sqrt{5}}}{15}\approx0.9609$
Icosahedron		$\frac{15+5\sqrt{5}}{12}\,s^3$	$5\sqrt{3}\,s^2$	$\frac{\sqrt[3]{2100\pi\sqrt{3}+900\pi\sqrt{15}}}{30}\approx0.9393$
Bicylinder		$\frac{16}{3}\,r^3$	$16\,r^2$	$\frac{\sqrt[3]{2\pi}}{2}\approx0.9226$
Ideal bicone $(h=r\sqrt{2})$		$\frac{2\pi}{3}\,r^{2}h=\frac{2\pi\sqrt{2}}{3}\,r^3$	$2\pi\,r\sqrt{r^{2}+h^{2}}=2\pi\sqrt{3}\,r^2$	$\frac{\sqrt[6]{432}}{3}\approx0.9165$
Dodecahedron		$\frac{15+7\sqrt{5}}{4}\,s^3$	$3\sqrt{25+10\sqrt{5}}\, s^2$	$\frac{\sqrt[6]{2080+928\sqrt{5}}\sqrt[3]{9\pi}\sqrt{5}}{30}\approx0.9105$
Rhombic dodecahedron		$\frac{16\sqrt{3}}{9}\,s^3$	$8\sqrt{2}\,s^2$	$\frac{\sqrt[6]{2592\pi^2}}{6}\approx0.9047$
Ideal torus $(R=r)$		$2\pi^2Rr^2=2\pi^2\,r^3$	$4\pi^2Rr=4\pi^2\,r^2$	$\frac{\sqrt[3]{18\pi^2}}{2\pi}\approx0.8947$
Ideal cylinder $(h=2r)$		$\pi\,r^2h=2\pi\,r^3$	$2\pi\,r(r+h)=6\pi\,r^2$	$\frac{\sqrt[3]{18}}{3}\approx0.8736$
Octahedron		$\frac{\sqrt{2}}{3}\,s^3$	$2\sqrt{3}\,s^2$	$\frac{\sqrt[3]{3\pi\sqrt{3}}}{3}\approx0.8456$
Hemisphere		$\frac{2\pi}{3}\,r^3$	$3\pi\,r^2$	$\frac{2\sqrt[3]{2}}{3}\approx0.8399$
Cube		$\,s^3$	$6\,s^2$	$\frac{\sqrt[3]{36\pi}}{6}\approx0.8060$
Ideal cone $(h=2r\sqrt{2})$		$\frac{\pi}{3}\,r^2h=\frac{2\pi\sqrt{2}}{3}\,r^3$	$\pi\,r(r+\sqrt{r^2+h^2})=4\pi\,r^2$	$\frac{\sqrt[3]{4}}{2}\approx0.7937$
Tetrahedron		$\frac{\sqrt{2}}{12}\,s^3$	$\sqrt{3}\,s^2$	$\frac{\sqrt[3]{12\pi\sqrt{3}}}{6}\approx0.6711$

== See also ==
- Equivalent spherical diameter
- Flattening
- Isoperimetric ratio
- Rounding (sediment)
- Roundness
- Willmore energy
