= Tom Ilmanen =

American mathematician

- Born: 1961
- Died: 2025 (aged 63–64)
- Education: Ph.D. in Mathematics
- Alma mater: University of California, Berkeley
- Occupation: Mathematician
- Known for: Research in differential geometry, proof of Riemannian Penrose conjecture
- Scientific career
- Doctoral advisor: Lawrence Craig Evans

Tom Ilmanen (1961–2025) was an American mathematician specializing in differential geometry and the calculus of variations. He was a professor at ETH Zurich. He obtained his PhD in 1991 at the University of California, Berkeley with Lawrence Craig Evans as supervisor. Ilmanen and Gerhard Huisken used inverse mean curvature flow to prove the Riemannian Penrose conjecture, which is the fifteenth problem in Yau's list of open problems, and was resolved at the same time in greater generality by Hubert Bray using alternative methods.

In their 2001 paper, Huisken and Ilmanen made a conjecture on the mathematics of general relativity, about the curvature in spaces with very little mass: as the mass of the space shrinks to zero, the curvature of the space also shrinks to zero. This was proved in 2023 by Conghan Dong and Antoine Song.

In an influential 1995 preprint, Ilmanen made the following conjecture:

For a smooth one-parameter family of closed embedded surfaces in Euclidean 3-space flowing by mean curvature, every tangent flow at the first singular time has multiplicity one.

This has become known as the "multiplicity-one" conjecture. Richard Bamler and Bruce Kleiner proved the multiplicity-one conjecture in a 2023 preprint.

Ilmanen received a Sloan Fellowship in 1996.

He wrote the research monograph Elliptic Regularization and Partial Regularity for Motion by Mean Curvature.

== Selected publications ==
- Huisken, Gerhard, and Tom Ilmanen. "The inverse mean curvature flow and the Riemannian Penrose inequality." Journal of Differential Geometry 59.3 (2001): 353–437. DOI: 10.4310/jdg/1090349447
- Ilmanen, Tom. "Convergence of the Allen-Cahn equation to Brakke's motion by mean curvature." Journal of Differential Geometry 38.2 (1993): 417–461.
- Feldman, Mikhail, Tom Ilmanen, and Dan Knopf. "Rotationally symmetric shrinking and expanding gradient Kähler-Ricci solitons." Journal of Differential Geometry 65.2 (2003): 169–209.
