= Huisgen =

Huisgen is a surname. Notable people with the surname include:

- Andrea Huisgen (born 1990), Spanish beauty pageant winner
- Rolf Huisgen (1920–2020), German chemist

== See also ==
- Huisken
