= Magdalena Toda =

Romanian-American mathematician

Magdalena Daniela Toda is a Romanian-American mathematician and a professor of mathematics. She is also Italian through marriage. Her research focuses on the curvature of surfaces, geometric flow, the geometry of timelike surfaces, and the uses of differential geometry and partial differential equations in scientific and engineering applications.

== Education and career ==
Toda did her early education in Romania. She arrived in the US in 1995 as a student and is currently a US citizen. She earned a licenciate (effectively a combined bachelor's and master's degree) in mathematics from the University of Bucharest in 1991. After moving to the US, she continued her education at the University of Kansas, where she earned a second master's degree in 1997 and completed her Ph.D. in 2000, while also receiving a Ph.D. from the Politehnica University of Bucharest. Her dissertation, Pseudospherical Surfaces via Moving Frames and Loop Groups, was jointly supervised by Josef Dorfmeister at the University of Kansas, and Constantin Udriște of the Politehnica University of Bucharest.

She became an assistant professor on tenure-track at Ball State University in 2000, and moved to Texas Tech in 2001 for the same type of position. There, she was tenured as an associate professor in 2008 and promoted to full professor in 2014. She became interim department chair in 2015 and permanent chair in 2016, with a leave in 2022–2023 to serve as program director for applied mathematics at the National Science Foundation.

Effective July 2026, she is appointed as Dean of the College of Natural and Applied Sciences at Missouri State University. Toda's administrative and academic work has emphasized the integration of research, teaching, and institutional leadership. She has advocated for interdisciplinary collaboration across the sciences, mathematics, engineering, and scientific computing, while promoting student participation in research and innovation. Her leadership activities have focused on student and faculty success, graduate education, research growth, multi-year postdoctoral and research appointments, and the development of academic programs that connect emerging technologies with scientific discovery and workforce development.

== Recognition ==
The Association for Women in Mathematics named Toda to their 2025 Class of AWM Fellows..

== Books ==
Toda is the editor of the research monograph Willmore Energy and Willmore Conjecture (CRC Press / Chapman & Hall 2017). In 2010, she was added as a coauthor to the Calculus textbook by Karl J. Smith and M. J. Strauss, replacing Gerald L. Bradley, a textbook that has been in print in various formats and used at Texas Tech, Rutgers University, and other national colleges.
