= Riemannian Penrose inequality =

Estimates the mass of a spacetime in terms of the total area of its black holes

In mathematical general relativity, the Penrose inequality, first conjectured by Sir Roger Penrose, estimates the mass of a spacetime in terms of the total area of its black holes and is a generalization of the positive mass theorem. The Riemannian Penrose inequality is an important special case. Specifically, if (M, g) is an asymptotically flat Riemannian 3-manifold with nonnegative scalar curvature and ADM mass m, and A is the area of the outermost minimal surface (possibly with multiple connected components), then the Riemannian Penrose inequality asserts

$$m \geq \sqrt{\frac{A}{16\pi}}.$$

This is purely a geometrical fact, and it corresponds to the case of a complete three-dimensional, space-like, totally geodesic submanifold of a (3 + 1)-dimensional spacetime. Such a submanifold is often called a time-symmetric initial data set for a spacetime. The condition of (M, g) having nonnegative scalar curvature is equivalent to the spacetime obeying the dominant energy condition.

This inequality was first proved by Gerhard Huisken and Tom Ilmanen in 1997 in the case where A is the area of the largest component of the outermost minimal surface. Their proof relied on the machinery of weakly defined inverse mean curvature flow, which they developed. In 1999, Hubert Bray gave the first complete proof of the above inequality using a conformal flow of metrics. Both of the papers were published in 2001.

== Physical motivation ==
The original physical argument that led Penrose to conjecture such an inequality invoked the Hawking area theorem and the cosmic censorship hypothesis.

== Case of equality ==
Both the Bray and Huisken–Ilmanen proofs of the Riemannian Penrose inequality state that under the hypotheses, if

$$m = \sqrt{\frac{A}{16\pi}},$$

then the manifold in question is isometric to a slice of the Schwarzschild spacetime outside its outermost minimal surface, which is a sphere of Schwarzschild radius.

== Penrose conjecture ==
More generally, Penrose conjectured that an inequality as above should hold for spacelike submanifolds of spacetimes that are not necessarily time-symmetric. In this case, nonnegative scalar curvature is replaced with the dominant energy condition, and one possibility is to replace the minimal surface condition with an apparent horizon condition. Proving such an inequality remains an open problem in general relativity, called the Penrose conjecture.

== In popular culture ==
- In episode 6 of season 8 of the television sitcom The Big Bang Theory, Dr. Sheldon Cooper claims to be in the process of solving the Penrose Conjecture while at the same time composing his Nobel Prize acceptance speech.
