= Huisken =

Huisken is a Dutch surname. Notable people with the surname include:

- Carl Huisken (1902–1987), Dutch Olympic sailor
- Gerhard Huisken (born 1958), German mathematician
  - Huisken's monotonicity formula

== See also ==
- Huiskens
