= Michael Gage =

Michael Gage may refer to:

- Michael Gage (mathematician), American mathematician
- Michael Gage (politician) (1945–2021), American politician

== See also ==
- Michael Cage (born 1962), American former professional basketball player
