= Roundness (geology) =

Smoothness of clastic particles

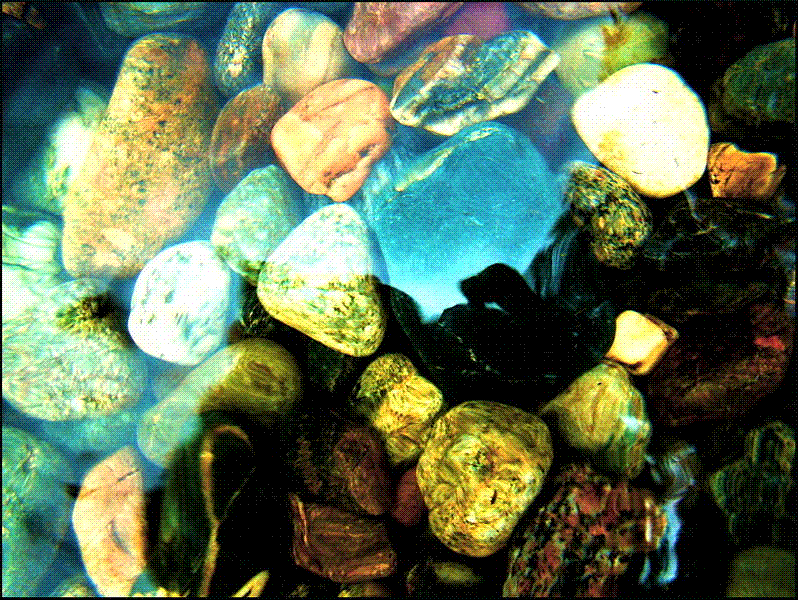
Rounded pebbles in a streambed

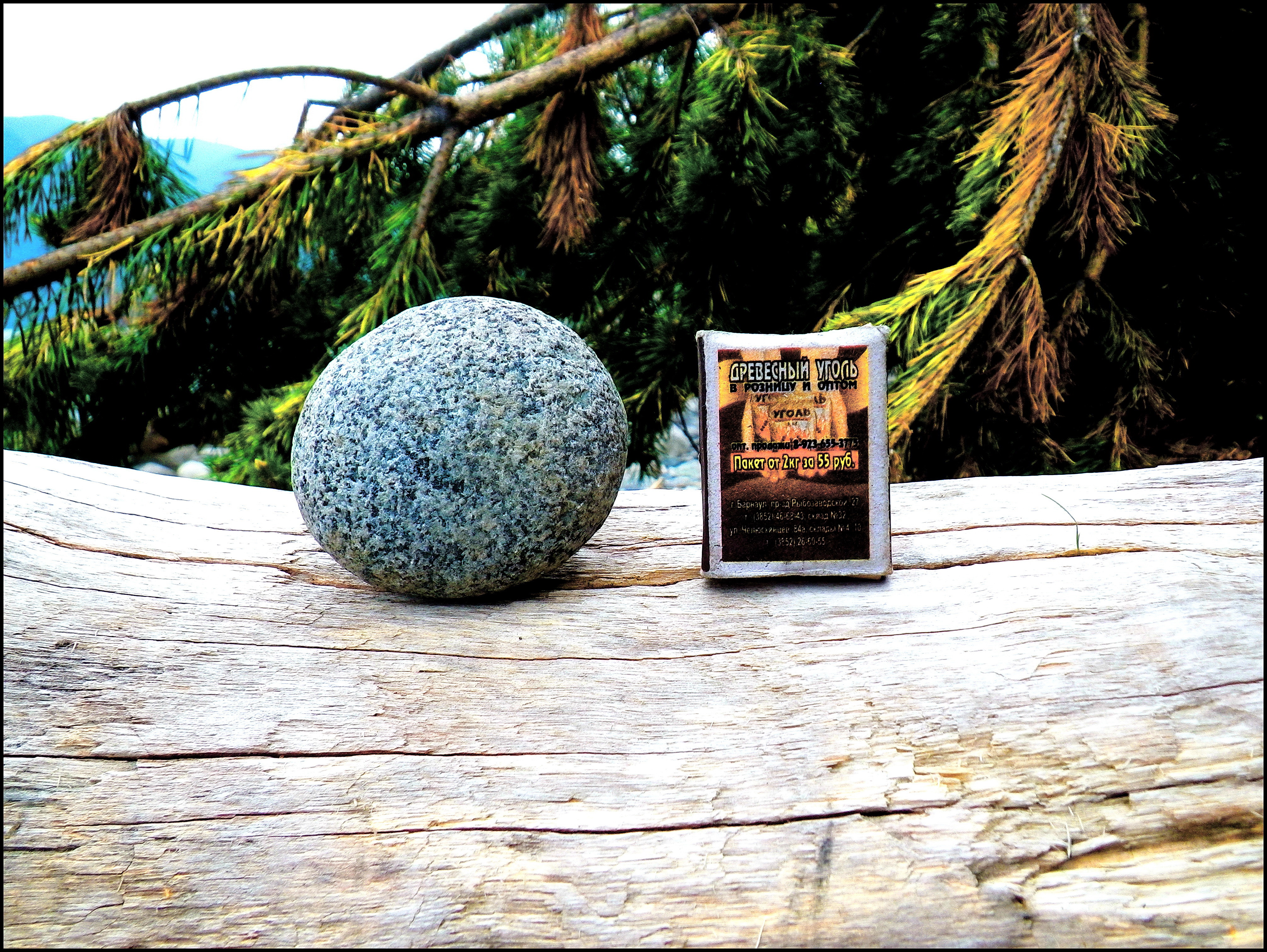
Well-rounded cobble from the beach on Teletskoe Lake, Altai Republic

Roundness is the degree of smoothing due to abrasion of sedimentary particles. It is expressed as the ratio of the average radius of curvature of the edges or corners to the radius of curvature of the maximum inscribed sphere.

== Measure of roundness ==
Schematic representation of difference in grain shape. Two parameters are shown: sphericity (vertical) and rounding (horizontal).

Rounding, roundness or angularity are terms used to describe the shape of the corners on a particle (or clast) of sediment. Such a particle may be a grain of sand, a pebble, cobble or boulder. Although roundness can be numerically quantified, for practical reasons geologists typically use a simple visual chart with up to six categories of roundness:

- Very angular: corners sharp and jagged
- Angular
- Sub-angular
- Sub-rounded
- Rounded
- Well-rounded: corners completely rounded

This six-fold category characterisation is used in the Shepard and Young comparison chart and the Powers chart but the Krumbein chart has nine categories.

Rounding of sediment particles can indicate the distance and time involved in the transportation of the sediment from the source area to where it is deposited.

Speed of rounding will depend on composition, hardness and mineral cleavage. For example, a soft claystone pebble will obviously round much faster, and over a shorter distance of transport, than a more resistant quartz pebble. The rate of rounding is also affected by the grain size and energy conditions.

Angularity (A) and roundness (R) are but two parameters of the complexity of a clast's generalised form (F). A defining expression is given by:

F=f(Sh, A, R, Sp, T) where f denotes a functional relationship between these terms and where Sh denotes the shape, Sp the sphericity and T the micro-scale surface texture.

An example of this practical use has been applied to the roundness of the grains in the Gulf of Mexico in order to observe the distance from the source rocks.

== Abrasion ==
Abrasion occurs in natural environments such as beaches, sand dunes, river or stream beds by the action of current flow, wave impact, glacial action, wind, gravitational creep and other erosive agents.

Recent studies have demonstrated that aeolian processes are more efficient in the rounding of sedimentary grains. Experimental studies have shown that the angularity of sand-sized detrital quartz can remain virtually unchanged after hundreds of kilometers of fluvial transport.

== Paleogeographic value of determining the degree of roundness of clastic material ==
Roundness is an important indicator of the genetic affiliation of a clastic rock. The degree of roundness points to the range and mode of transport of clastic material, and can also serve as a search criterion in mineral exploration, especially for placer deposits.

Alluvial debris in major rivers tend to exhibit a high degree of roundness. Alluvium from small rivers is less rounded. Deposits of ephemeral streams exhibit little rounding with angular clasts.

== Clast rounding in non-sedimentary environments ==
Pebble dikes are dikelike bodies found in intrusive environments, usually associated with porphyry-type ore deposits, which contain variably rounded fragments in a finely-ground matrix of pulverized rock. The clasts originate in deeper formations in hydrothermal systems, and have been brought up explosively by diatreme or intrusive breccias as groundwater and/or magmatic water flash boils. The clasts have been rounded due to thermal spallation, milling action, or corrosion by hydrothermal fluids. The ore deposits of Tintic mining district and White Pine mining district, and East Traverse Mountain, Utah; Urad, Mt. Emmons, Central City, Leadville, and Ouray, Colorado; Butte, Montana; Silver Bell; and Bisbee, Arizona; and the Kiruna iron deposit in Sweden, Cuajone and Toquepala in Peru; El Salvador in Chile; Mt. Morgan in Australia; and Agua Rica in Argentina contain these pebble dikes.

== See also ==
- Sorting (sediment)
- Sphericity
- Tumble finishing
