= Inverse mean curvature flow =

Geometric flow

In the mathematical fields of differential geometry and geometric analysis, inverse mean curvature flow (IMCF) is a geometric flow of submanifolds of a Riemannian or pseudo-Riemannian manifold. It has been used to prove a certain case of the Riemannian Penrose inequality, which is of interest in general relativity.

Formally, given a pseudo-Riemannian manifold (M, g) and a smooth manifold S, an inverse mean curvature flow consists of an open interval I and a smooth map F from I × S into M such that

$$\frac{\partial F}{\partial t}=\frac{-\mathbf H}{|\mathbf H|^2},$$

where H is the mean curvature vector of the immersion F(t, ⋅).

If g is Riemannian, if S is closed with dim(M) = dim(S) + 1, and if a given smooth immersion f of S into M has mean curvature which is nowhere zero, then there exists a unique inverse mean curvature flow whose "initial data" is f.

== Gerhardt's convergence theorem ==
A simple example of inverse mean curvature flow is given by a family of concentric round hyperspheres in Euclidean space. If the dimension of such a sphere is n and its radius is r, then its mean curvature is n/r. As such, such a family of concentric spheres forms an inverse mean curvature flow if and only if

$$r'(t)=\frac{r(t)}{n}.$$

So a family of concentric round hyperspheres forms an inverse mean curvature flow when the radii grow exponentially.

In 1990, Claus Gerhardt showed that this situation is characteristic of the more general case of mean-convex star-shaped smooth hypersurfaces of Euclidean space. In particular, for any such initial data, the inverse mean curvature flow exists for all positive time and consists only of mean-convex and star-shaped smooth hypersurfaces. Moreover the surface area grows exponentially, and after a rescaling that fixes the surface area, the surfaces converge smoothly to a round sphere. The geometric estimates in Gerhardt's work follow from the maximum principle; the asymptotic roundness then becomes a consequence of the Krylov-Safonov theorem. In addition, Gerhardt's methods apply simultaneously to more general curvature-based hypersurface flows.

As is typical of geometric flows, IMCF solutions in more general situations often have finite-time singularities, meaning that I often cannot be taken to be of the form (a, ∞).

== Huisken and Ilmanen's weak solutions ==
Following the seminal works of Yun Gang Chen, Yoshikazu Giga, and Shun'ichi Goto, and of Lawrence Evans and Joel Spruck on the mean curvature flow, Gerhard Huisken and Tom Ilmanen replaced the IMCF equation, for hypersurfaces in a Riemannian manifold (M, g), by the elliptic partial differential equation

$$\operatorname{div}_g\frac{du}{|du|_g}=|du|_g$$

for a real-valued function u on M. Weak solutions of this equation can be specified by a variational principle. Huisken and Ilmanen proved that for any complete and connected smooth Riemannian manifold (M, g) which is asymptotically flat or asymptotically conic, and for any precompact and open subset U of M whose boundary is a smooth embedded submanifold, there is a proper and locally Lipschitz function u on M which is a positive weak solution on the complement of U and which is nonpositive on U; moreover such a function is uniquely determined on the complement of U.

The idea is that, as t increases, the boundary of {x : u(x) < t} moves through the hypersurfaces arising in a inverse mean curvature flow, with the initial condition given by the boundary of U. However, the elliptic and weak setting gives a broader context, as such boundaries can have irregularities and can jump discontinuously, which is impossible in the usual inverse mean curvature flow.

In the special case that M is three-dimensional and g has nonnegative scalar curvature, Huisken and Ilmanen showed that a certain geometric quantity known as the Hawking mass can be defined for the boundary of {x : u(x) < t}, and is monotonically non-decreasing as t increases. In the simpler case of a smooth inverse mean curvature flow, this amounts to a local calculation and was shown in the 1970s by the physicist Robert Geroch. In Huisken and Ilmanen's setting, it is more nontrivial due to the possible irregularities and discontinuities of the surfaces involved.

As a consequence of Huisken and Ilmanen's extension of Geroch's monotonicity, they were able to use the Hawking mass to interpolate between the surface area of an "outermost" minimal surface and the ADM mass of an asymptotically flat three-dimensional Riemannian manifold of nonnegative scalar curvature. This settled a certain case of the Riemannian Penrose inequality.

== Example: inverse mean curvature flow of a m-dimensional spheres ==
A simple example of inverse mean curvature flow is given by a family of concentric round hyperspheres in $\mathbb{R}^{m+1}$. The mean curvature of an $m$-dimensional sphere of radius $r$ is $H = \frac{m}{r} \in \mathbb{R}$.

Due to the rotational symmetry of the sphere (or in general, due to the invariance of mean curvature under isometries) the inverse mean curvature flow equation $\partial_t F = H^{-1} \nu$ reduces to the ordinary differential equation, for an initial sphere of radius $r_0$,

$$\begin{align}
\frac{\text{d}}{\text{d}t} r(t) = & \frac{r(t)}{m}, \\
r(0) = & r_0 .
\end{align}$$

The solution of this ODE (obtained, e.g., by separation of variables) is

$$r(t) = r_0 e^{t/m}$$.
