= WeBWorK =

Online homework delivery system

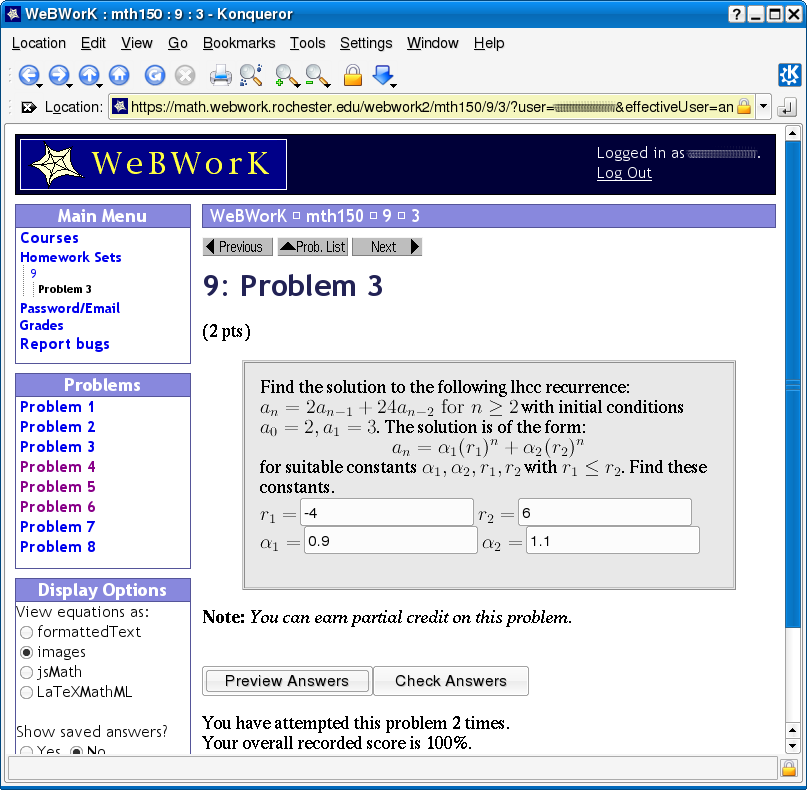
- A screenshot of a problem in WeBWorK
- Developer: The WeBWorK Project
- Stable release: 2.19 / 6 August 2024; 15 months ago
- Repository: github.com/openwebwork/webwork2
- Written in: Perl
- License: Artistic and GPL
- Website: openwebwork.org

WeBWorK is an online homework delivery system primarily used for mathematics and science. It allows students to complete their homework over the web, and receive instantaneous feedback as to the correctness of their responses. WeBWorK uses a Perl-based language called PG to specify exercises, which allows instructors a great deal of flexibility in how exercises are presented.

WeBWorK was originally developed at the University of Rochester by professors Michael Gage and Arnold Pizer. It is now a free software project maintained by many contributors at several colleges and universities. It is made available under the Artistic License (the same license as Perl) and the GNU General Public License. WeBWorK is currently maintained by The WeBWorK Project.

WeBWorK is currently used by many universities and high-schools around the world.

WeBWorK is supported by the National Science Foundation and the Mathematical Association of America.
