= Symmetrization methods =

Mathematical algorithms

In mathematics the symmetrization methods are algorithms of transforming a set $A\subset \mathbb{R}^n$ to a ball $B\subset \mathbb{R}^n$ with equal volume $\operatorname{vol}(B)=\operatorname{vol}(A)$ and centered at the origin. B is called the symmetrized version of A, usually denoted $A^{*}$. These algorithms show up in solving the classical isoperimetric inequality problem, which asks: Given all two-dimensional shapes of a given area, which of them has the minimal perimeter (for details see Isoperimetric inequality). The conjectured answer was the disk and Steiner in 1838 showed this to be true using the Steiner symmetrization method (described below). From this many other isoperimetric problems sprung and other symmetrization algorithms. For example, Rayleigh's conjecture is that the first eigenvalue of the Dirichlet problem is minimized for the ball (see Rayleigh–Faber–Krahn inequality for details). Another problem is that the Newtonian capacity of a set A is minimized by $A^{*}$ and this was proved by Pólya and G. Szegő (1951) using circular symmetrization (described below).

== Symmetrization ==
If $\Omega\subset \mathbb{R}^n$ is measurable, then it is denoted by $\Omega^{*}$ the symmetrized version of $\Omega$ i.e. a ball $\Omega^{*}:=B_r(0)\subset\mathbb{R}^n$ such that $\operatorname{vol}(\Omega^{*})=\operatorname{vol}(\Omega)$. We denote by $f^{*}$ the symmetric decreasing rearrangement of nonnegative measurable function f and define it as $f^{*}(x):=\int_0^\infty 1_{\{y:f(y)>t\}^{*}}(x) \, dt$, where $\{y:f(y)>t\}^{*}$ is the symmetrized version of preimage set $\{y:f(y)>t\}$. The methods described below have been proved to transform $\Omega$ to $\Omega^{*}$ i.e. given a sequence of symmetrization transformations $\{T_k\}$ there is $\lim\limits_{k\to \infty}d_{Ha}(\Omega^{*}, T_k(K) )=0$, where $d_{Ha}$ is the Hausdorff distance (for discussion and proofs see Burchard (2009))

== Steiner symmetrization ==
Steiner Symmetrization of set $\Omega$

Steiner symmetrization was introduced by Steiner (1838) to solve the isoperimetric theorem stated above. Let $H\subset\mathbb{R}^n$ be a hyperplane through the origin. Rotate space so that $H$ is the $x_n=0$ ($x_n$ is the nth coordinate in $\mathbb{R}^n$) hyperplane. For each $x\in H$ let the perpendicular line through $x\in H$ be $L_x = \{x+ye_n:y\in \mathbb{R}\}$. Then by replacing each $\Omega\cap L_x$ by a line centered at H and with length $|\Omega\cap L_x|$ we obtain the Steiner symmetrized version.

$$\operatorname{St}(\Omega):=\{x+ye_n:x+ze_n\in \Omega \text{ for some } z \text{ and } |y|\leq\frac{1}{2} |\Omega\cap L_x|\}.$$

It is denoted by $\operatorname{St}(f)$ the Steiner symmetrization wrt to $x_n=0$ hyperplane of nonnegative measurable function $f:\mathbb{R}^d\to \mathbb{R}$ and for fixed $x_1,\ldots,x_{n-1}$ define it as

$$St: f(x_1,\ldots,x_{n-1},\cdot)\mapsto (f(x_1,\ldots,x_{n-1},\cdot))^{*}.$$

=== Properties ===
- It preserves convexity: if $\Omega$ is convex, then $St(\Omega)$ is also convex.
- It is linear: $St(x+\lambda \Omega)=St(x)+\lambda St(\Omega)$.
- Super-additive: $St(K)+St(U)\subset St(K+U)$.

== Circular symmetrization ==
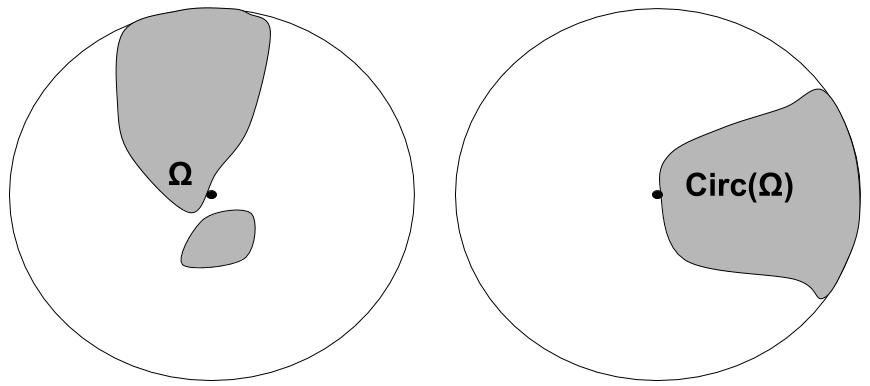
Circular symmetrization of set $\Omega$

A popular method for symmetrization in the plane is Polya's circular symmetrization. After, its generalization will be described to higher dimensions. Let $\Omega\subset \mathbb{C}$ be a domain; then its circular symmetrization $\operatorname{Circ}(\Omega)$ with regard to the positive real axis is defined as follows: Let

$\Omega_t:=\{\theta \in [0,2\pi]:te^{i\theta}\in \Omega\}$

i.e. contain the arcs of radius t contained in $\Omega$. So it is defined

- If $\Omega_t$ is the full circle, then $\operatorname{Circ}(\Omega)\cap \{|z|=t\}:=\{|z|=t\}$.
- If the length is $m(\Omega_t)=\alpha$, then $\operatorname{Circ}(\Omega)\cap \{|z|=t\}:=\{te^{i\theta}: |\theta|<\frac{\alpha}{2}\}$.
- $0,\infty\in \operatorname{Circ}(\Omega)$ iff $0,\infty \in \Omega$.

In higher dimensions $\Omega\subset \mathbb{R}^n$, its spherical symmetrization $Sp^n(\Omega)$ wrt to positive axis of $x_1$ is defined as follows: Let $\Omega_r:=\{x\in \mathbb{S}^{n-1}: rx\in \Omega\}$ i.e. contain the caps of radius r contained in $\Omega$. Also, for the first coordinate let $\operatorname{angle}(x_1):=\theta$ if $x_1=rcos\theta$. So as above

- If $\Omega_r$ is the full cap, then $Sp^n(\Omega)\cap \{|z|=r\}:=\{|z|=r\}$.
- If the surface area is $m_s(\Omega_t)=\alpha$, then $Sp^n(\Omega)\cap \{|z|=r\}:=\{x:|x|=r$ and $0\leq \operatorname{angle}(x_1)\leq \theta_\alpha\}=:C(\theta_\alpha)$ where $\theta_\alpha$ is picked so that its surface area is $m_s (C(\theta_\alpha)=\alpha$. In words, $C(\theta_\alpha)$ is a cap symmetric around the positive axis $x_1$ with the same area as the intersection $\Omega\cap \{|z|=r\}$.
- $0,\infty\in Sp^n(\Omega)$ iff $0,\infty \in \Omega$.

== Polarization ==
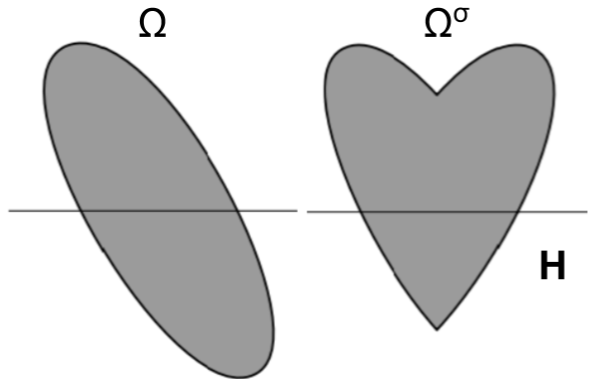
Polarization of set $\Omega$

Let $\Omega\subset\mathbb{R}^n$ be a domain and $H^{n-1}\subset\mathbb{R}^n$ be a hyperplane through the origin. Denote the reflection across that plane to the positive halfspace $\mathbb{H}^{+}$ as $\sigma_H$ or just $\sigma$ when it is clear from the context. Also, the reflected $\Omega$ across hyperplane H is defined as $\sigma \Omega$. Then, the polarized $\Omega$ is denoted as $\Omega^\sigma$ and defined as follows

- If $x\in \Omega\cap \mathbb{H}^{+}$, then $x\in \Omega^{\sigma}$.
- If $x\in \Omega\cap \sigma(\Omega) \cap \mathbb{H}^{-}$, then $x\in \Omega^{\sigma}$.
- If $x\in (\Omega\setminus \sigma(\Omega)) \cap \mathbb{H}^{-}$, then $\sigma x\in \Omega^{\sigma}$.

In words, $(\Omega\setminus \sigma(\Omega)) \cap \mathbb{H}^{-}$ is simply reflected to the halfspace $\mathbb{H}^{+}$. It turns out that this transformation can approximate the above ones (in the Hausdorff distance) (see Brock & Solynin (2000)).
