= Bajo de la Alumbrera mine =

Gold and copper mine in Argentina

Bajo de la Alumbrera
- Location within Argentina
- Location: Catamarca Province, Argentina; 27°19′50″S 66°36′30″W
- Products: Gold and copper
- Type: Open pit
- Opened: 1997
- Closed: 2018
- Company: Minera Alumbrera
- Website: www.alumbrera.com.ar/quienes-somos/acerca-de-minera-alumbrera/

Bajo de la Alumbrera mine was a gold and copper mine in the Catamarca Province, of Argentina. It was the largest and the oldest open pit mine in Argentina.

The mine opened in 1997 and was met with local opposition before complaints about environmental pollution. The mine closed in 2018. However, it has been reported that Glencore intend to reopen it in 2026.

== Description ==
Bajo de la Alumbrera mine was a gold and copper mine in the Catamarca Province, of Argentina. It is located 70 kilometres west of Andalgalá and cost $1.2 billion to open.

It is the largest and the oldest open pit mine in Argentina. In 2000, the mine was the fourteenth largest gold mine in the world and the ninth largest copper mine.

The mine had 648 million metric tons of 0.54% copper and gold at 0.67 grams per metric ton.

The mine uses cyanide and sulphuric acid to extract the copper and gold from the ore. It uses between 60 million and 100 million litres of water per day. The mine produces 314,000 tons of ore daily, which is mixed with water into mud that is piped 216 kilometres to San Miguel de Tucumán. In Tucumán, the mud is dried and concentrated before being moved by train to the Port of Rosario for separation and smelting outside Argentina.

A 930 hectare tailing pond captures mine effluent.

== History ==
The mine opened in 1997, the first open pit mine in Argentina at the time. The mine's opening was met with complaints from activist, academics and the media. Although disputed by the mine's owners, Minera Alumbrera [ES], accusations linking the mine's activities to land, air occurred. In 2009, Minera Alumbrera was jointly owned by Xstrata, Goldcorp, Northern Orion Resources, and the Argentinian government owned company: Mineral Deposits of the Waters of Dionysius.

In 2008, the mine's owners were investigated for corruption, environmental criminality and gold smuggling.

The 2009, 2010, and 2011 sustainability report published by the mine's owners downplayed environmental concerns raised about the mine. In 2011 and 2012, local community members protested the mine, including blocking the National Route 40 near Belén in May 2012. Protests were stopped by police without any dialogue with mine owners.

The mine stopped operating at the end of 2018. By 2018, the nearby Andalgalá community had successfully campaigned to halt the opening of the nearby Agua Rica mine for eight years.

It has been reported that Glencore intend to reopen the Bajo de la Alumbrera mine in 2026.

== Environmental impact ==
The mine's water consumption is the cause of desertification and activists have reported five leaks from the mine's pipelines. The water removed from the mud in Tucumán goes into the DP2 canal before reaching the Sali-Dulce river. The river is without plant and fish life. The canal has copper and arsenic at 20,000 the legal limit and levels of cadmium 5,000 times and mercury 10,000 times the legal limit, according to Bajo Alumbrera activist organization.
