= Positive energy theorem =

Key result in general relativity

The positive energy theorem (also known as the positive mass theorem) refers to a collection of foundational results in general relativity and differential geometry. Its standard form, broadly speaking, asserts that the gravitational energy of an isolated system is nonnegative, and can only be zero when the system has no gravitating objects. Although these statements are often thought of as being primarily physical in nature, they can be formalized as mathematical theorems which can be proven using techniques of differential geometry, partial differential equations, and geometric measure theory.

Richard Schoen and Shing-Tung Yau, in 1979 and 1981, were the first to give proofs of the positive mass theorem. Edward Witten, in 1982, gave the outlines of an alternative proof, which were later filled in rigorously by mathematicians. Witten and Yau were awarded the Fields Medal in mathematics in part for their work on this topic.

An imprecise formulation of the Schoen-Yau / Witten positive energy theorem states the following:

Given an asymptotically flat initial data set, one can define the energy-momentum of each infinite region as an element of Minkowski space. Provided that the initial data set is geodesically complete and satisfies the dominant energy condition, each such element must be in the causal future of the origin. If any infinite region has null energy-momentum, then the initial data set is trivial in the sense that it can be geometrically embedded in Minkowski space.

The meaning of these terms is discussed below. There are alternative and non-equivalent formulations for different notions of energy-momentum and for different classes of initial data sets. Not all of these formulations have been rigorously proven, and it is currently an open problem whether the above formulation holds for initial data sets of arbitrary dimension.

== Historical overview ==
The original proof of the theorem for ADM mass was provided by Richard Schoen and Shing-Tung Yau in 1979 using variational methods and minimal surfaces. Edward Witten gave another proof in 1981 based on the use of spinors, inspired by positive energy theorems in the context of supergravity. An extension of the theorem for the Bondi mass was given by Ludvigsen and James Vickers, Gary Horowitz and Malcolm Perry, and Schoen and Yau.

Gary Gibbons, Stephen Hawking, Horowitz and Perry proved extensions of the theorem to asymptotically anti-de Sitter spacetimes and to Einstein–Maxwell theory. The mass of an asymptotically anti-de Sitter spacetime is non-negative and only equal to zero for anti-de Sitter spacetime. In Einstein–Maxwell theory, for a spacetime with electric charge $Q$ and magnetic charge $P$, the mass of the spacetime satisfies (in Gaussian units)

$$M \geq \sqrt{Q^2 + P^2},$$

with equality for the Majumdar–Papapetrou extremal black hole solutions.

== Initial data sets ==
An initial data set consists of a Riemannian manifold (M, g) and a symmetric 2-tensor field k on M. One says that an initial data set (M, g, k):

- is time-symmetric if k is zero
- is maximal if tr^{g}k = 0
- satisfies the dominant energy condition if

$$R^g-|k|_g^2+(\operatorname{tr}_gk)^2\geq 2\big|\operatorname{div}^gk-d(\operatorname{tr}_gk)\big|_g,$$

where R^{g} denotes the scalar curvature of g.

Note that a time-symmetric initial data set (M, g, 0) satisfies the dominant energy condition if and only if the scalar curvature of g is nonnegative. One says that a Lorentzian manifold (M̅, g̅) is a development of an initial data set (M, g, k) if there is a (necessarily spacelike) hypersurface embedding of M into M̅, together with a continuous unit normal vector field, such that the induced metric is g and the second fundamental form with respect to the given unit normal is k.

This definition is motivated from Lorentzian geometry. Given a Lorentzian manifold (M̅, g̅) of dimension n + 1 and a spacelike immersion f from a connected n-dimensional manifold M into M̅ which has a trivial normal bundle, one may consider the induced Riemannian metric g = f^{*}g̅ as well as the second fundamental form k of f with respect to either of the two choices of continuous unit normal vector field along f. The triple (M, g, k) is an initial data set. According to the Gauss-Codazzi equations, one has

$$\begin{align}
\overline{G}(\nu,\nu)&=\frac{1}{2}\Big(R^g-|k|_g^2+(\operatorname{tr}^gk)^2\Big)\\
\overline{G}(\nu,\cdot)&=d(\operatorname{tr}^gk)-\operatorname{div}^gk.
\end{align}$$

where G̅ denotes the Einstein tensor Ric^{g̅} - 1/2R^{g̅}g̅ of g̅ and ν denotes the continuous unit normal vector field along f used to define k. So the dominant energy condition as given above is, in this Lorentzian context, identical to the assertion that G̅(ν, ⋅), when viewed as a vector field along f, is timelike or null and is oriented in the same direction as ν.

== The ends of asymptotically flat initial data sets ==
In the literature there are several different notions of "asymptotically flat" which are not mutually equivalent. Usually it is defined in terms of weighted Hölder spaces or weighted Sobolev spaces.

However, there are some features which are common to virtually all approaches. One considers an initial data set (M, g, k) which may or may not have a boundary; let n denote its dimension. One requires that there is a compact subset K of M such that each connected component of the complement M − K is diffeomorphic to the complement of a closed ball in Euclidean space ℝ^{n}. Such connected components are called the ends of M.

== Formal statements ==
=== Schoen and Yau (1979) ===
Let (M, g, 0) be a time-symmetric initial data set satisfying the dominant energy condition. Suppose that (M, g) is an oriented three-dimensional smooth Riemannian manifold-with-boundary, and that each boundary component has positive mean curvature. Suppose that it has one end, and it is asymptotically Schwarzschild in the following sense:

Suppose that K is an open precompact subset of M such that there is a diffeomorphism Φ : ℝ^{3} − B_{1}(0) → M − K̅, and suppose that there is a number m such that the symmetric 2-tensor

$$h_{ij}=(\Phi^\ast g)_{ij}-\delta_{ij}-\frac{m}{2|x|}\delta_{ij}$$

on ℝ^{3} − B_{1}(0) is such that for any i, j, p, q, the functions $|x|^2h_{ij}(x),$ $|x|^3\partial_ph_{ij}(x),$ and $|x|^4\partial_p\partial_qh_{ij}(x)$ are all bounded.

Schoen and Yau's theorem asserts that m must be nonnegative. If, in addition, the functions $|x|^5\partial_p\partial_q\partial_rh_{ij}(x),$ $|x|^5\partial_p\partial_q\partial_r\partial_sh_{ij}(x),$ and $|x|^5\partial_p\partial_q\partial_r\partial_s\partial_th_{ij}(x)$ are bounded for any $i,j,p,q,r,s,t,$ then m must be positive unless the boundary of M is empty and (M, g) is isometric to ℝ^{3} with its standard Riemannian metric.

Note that the conditions on h are asserting that h, together with some of its derivatives, are small when x is large. Since h is measuring the defect between g in the coordinates Φ and the standard representation of the t = constant slice of the Schwarzschild metric, these conditions are a quantification of the term "asymptotically Schwarzschild". This can be interpreted in a purely mathematical sense as a strong form of "asymptotically flat", where the coefficient of the |x|^{−1} part of the expansion of the metric is declared to be a constant multiple of the Euclidean metric, as opposed to a general symmetric 2-tensor.

Note also that Schoen and Yau's theorem, as stated above, is actually (despite appearances) a strong form of the "multiple ends" case. If (M, g) is a complete Riemannian manifold with multiple ends, then the above result applies to any single end, provided that there is a positive mean curvature sphere in every other end. This is guaranteed, for instance, if each end is asymptotically flat in the above sense; one can choose a large coordinate sphere as a boundary, and remove the corresponding remainder of each end until one has a Riemannian manifold-with-boundary with a single end.

=== Schoen and Yau (1981) ===
Let (M, g, k) be an initial data set satisfying the dominant energy condition. Suppose that (M, g) is an oriented three-dimensional smooth complete Riemannian manifold (without boundary); suppose that it has finitely many ends, each of which is asymptotically flat in the following sense.

Suppose that $K\subset M$ is an open precompact subset such that $M\smallsetminus K$ has finitely many connected components $M_1,\ldots,M_n,$ and for each $i=1,\ldots,n$ there is a diffeomorphism $\Phi_i:\mathbb{R}^3\smallsetminus B_1(0)\to M_i$ such that the symmetric 2-tensor $h_{ij}=(\Phi^\ast g)_{ij}-\delta_{ij}$ satisfies the following conditions:

- $|x|h_{ij}(x),$ $|x|^2\partial_ph_{ij}(x),$ and $|x|^3\partial_p\partial_qh_{ij}(x)$ are bounded for all $i,j,p,q.$

Also suppose that

- $|x|^4 R^{\Phi_i^\ast g}$ and $|x|^5 \partial_pR^{\Phi_i^\ast g}$ are bounded for any $p$
- $|x|^2(\Phi_i^\ast k)_{ij}(x),$ $|x|^3\partial_p(\Phi_i^\ast k)_{ij}(x),$ and $|x|^4\partial_p\partial_q (\Phi_i^\ast k)_{ij}(x)$ for any $p,q,i,j$
- $|x|^3 ((\Phi_i^\ast k)_{11}(x)+(\Phi^\ast k)_{22}(x)+(\Phi_i^\ast k)_{33}(x))$ is bounded.

The conclusion is that the ADM energy of each $M_1,\ldots,M_n,$ defined as

$$\text{E}(M_i)=\frac{1}{16\pi}\lim_{r\to\infty}\int_{|x|=r}\sum_{p=1}^3\sum_{q=1}^3\big(\partial_q(\Phi_i^\ast g)_{pq}-\partial_p(\Phi_i^\ast g)_{qq}\big)\frac{x^p}{|x|}\,d\mathcal{H}^2(x),$$

is nonnegative. Furthermore, supposing in addition that

- $|x|^4\partial_p\partial_q\partial_r h_{ij}(x)$ and $|x|^4\partial_p\partial_q\partial_r\partial_s h_{ij}(x)$ are bounded for any $i,j,p,q,r,s,$

the assumption that $\text{E}(M_i)=0$ for some $i\in\{1,\ldots,n\}$ implies that n = 1, that M is diffeomorphic to ℝ^{3}, and that Minkowski space ℝ^{3,1} is a development of the initial data set (M, g, k).

=== Witten (1981) ===
Let $(M,g)$ be an oriented three-dimensional smooth complete Riemannian manifold (without boundary). Let $k$ be a smooth symmetric 2-tensor on $M$ such that

$$R^g-|k|_g^2+(\operatorname{tr}_gk)^2\geq 2\big|\operatorname{div}^gk-d(\operatorname{tr}_gk)\big|_g.$$

Suppose that $K\subset M$ is an open precompact subset such that $M\smallsetminus K$ has finitely many connected components $M_1,\ldots,M_n,$ and for each $\alpha=1,\ldots,n$ there is a diffeomorphism $\Phi_\alpha:\mathbb{R}^3\smallsetminus B_1(0)\to M_i$ such that the symmetric 2-tensor $h_{ij}=(\Phi^\ast_\alpha g)_{ij}-\delta_{ij}$ satisfies the following conditions:

- $|x|h_{ij}(x),$ $|x|^2\partial_ph_{ij}(x),$ and $|x|^3\partial_p\partial_qh_{ij}(x)$ are bounded for all $i,j,p,q.$
- $|x|^2(\Phi_\alpha^\ast k)_{ij}(x)$ and $|x|^3\partial_p(\Phi_\alpha^\ast k)_{ij}(x),$ are bounded for all $i,j,p.$

For each $\alpha=1,\ldots,n,$ define the ADM energy and linear momentum by

$$\text{E}(M_\alpha)=\frac{1}{16\pi}\lim_{r\to\infty}\int_{|x|=r}\sum_{p=1}^3\sum_{q=1}^3\big(\partial_q(\Phi_\alpha^\ast g)_{pq}-\partial_p(\Phi_\alpha^\ast g)_{qq}\big)\frac{x^p}{|x|}\,d\mathcal{H}^2(x),$$
$$\text{P}(M_\alpha)_p=\frac{1}{8\pi}\lim_{r\to\infty}\int_{|x|=r}\sum_{q=1}^3\big((\Phi_\alpha^\ast k)_{pq}-\big((\Phi_\alpha^\ast k)_{11}+(\Phi_\alpha^\ast k)_{22}+(\Phi_\alpha^\ast k)_{33}\big)\delta_{pq}\big)\frac{x^q}{|x|}\,d\mathcal{H}^2(x).$$

For each $\alpha=1,\ldots,n,$ consider this as a vector $(\text{P}(M_\alpha)_1,\text{P}(M_\alpha)_2,\text{P}(M_\alpha)_3,\text{E}(M_\alpha))$ in Minkowski space. Witten's conclusion is that for each $\alpha$ it is necessarily a future-pointing non-spacelike vector. If this vector is zero for any $\alpha,$ then $n=1,$ $M$ is diffeomorphic to $\mathbb{R}^3,$ and the maximal globally hyperbolic development of the initial data set $(M,g,k)$ has zero curvature.

=== Extensions and remarks ===
According to the above statements, Witten's conclusion is stronger than Schoen and Yau's. However, a third paper by Schoen and Yau shows that their 1981 result implies Witten's, retaining only the extra assumption that $|x|^4 R^{\Phi_i^\ast g}$ and $|x|^5 \partial_pR^{\Phi_i^\ast g}$ are bounded for any $p.$ It also must be noted that Schoen and Yau's 1981 result relies on their 1979 result, which is proved by contradiction; therefore their extension of their 1981 result is also by contradiction. By contrast, Witten's proof is logically direct, exhibiting the ADM energy directly as a nonnegative quantity. Furthermore, Witten's proof in the case $\operatorname{tr}_gk=0$ can be extended without much effort to higher-dimensional manifolds, under the topological condition that the manifold admits a spin structure. Schoen and Yau's 1979 result and proof can be extended to the case of any dimension less than eight. More recently, Witten's result, using Schoen and Yau (1981)'s methods, has been extended to the same context. These proofs fail in dimensions eight and above because minimal surfaces in these manifolds can contain isolated singularities. However, in dimension eight, singularities in minimal surfaces do not persist under perturbation, and a 1993 result by Nathan Smale that most ambient eight-dimensional manifolds contain no singular minimal surfaces is sufficient to prove the positive energy theorem in dimension eight. Similar proofs are also known up to dimension 11. In April 2017, Schoen and Yau released a preprint which proves the general higher-dimensional case for $\operatorname{tr}_gk=0$ without any restriction on dimension or topology.

The theorem fails in certain non-supersymmetric semiclassical gravity settings. In particular, in a Kaluza–Klein theory without fermions, the extra dimension can spontaneously collapse and nucleate a rapidly expanding hole devoid of spacetime called a bubble of nothing.

== Applications ==
- In 1984 Schoen used the positive mass theorem in his work which completed the solution of the Yamabe problem.
- The positive mass theorem was used in Hubert Bray's proof of the Riemannian Penrose inequality.
