= Isoperimetric ratio =

In analytic geometry, the isoperimetric ratio of a simple closed curve in the Euclidean plane is the ratio L^{2}/A, where L is the length of the curve and A is its area. It is a dimensionless quantity that is invariant under similarity transformations of the curve.

According to the isoperimetric inequality, the isoperimetric ratio has its minimum value, 4π, for a circle; any other curve has a larger value. Thus, the isoperimetric ratio can be used to measure how far from circular a shape is.

The curve-shortening flow decreases the isoperimetric ratio of any smooth convex curve so that, in the limit as the curve shrinks to a point, the ratio becomes 4π.

For higher-dimensional bodies of dimension d, the isoperimetric ratio can similarly be defined as B^{d}/V^{d − 1} where B is the surface area of the body (the measure of its boundary) and V is its volume (the measure of its interior). Other related quantities include the Cheeger constant of a Riemannian manifold and the (differently defined) Cheeger constant of a graph.
