= Agua Rica mine =

Mine in Argentina

Coordinates: 27.3733°S 66.3128°W

- Interactive map of Agua Rica mine
- Location: Catamarca Province, Argentina
- Products: Copper
- Company: Yamana gold

The Agua Rica mine is a large copper mine located in northwest Argentina, in Catamarca Province. Agua Rica represents one of the largest copper reserve in Argentina and in the world having estimated reserves of 384.9 million tonnes of ore grading 0.56% copper and 0.033% molybdenum.

By 2018, the nearby Andalgalá community had successfully campaigned to halt the opening of the mine for eight years.

== See also ==
- Bajo de la Alumbrera mine
