= Gerhard Huisken =

German mathematician (born 1958)

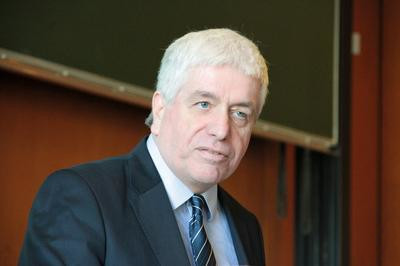
- Gerhard Huisken in 2017
- Born: 20 May 1958 (age 68); Hamburg, Germany
- Education: Heidelberg University
- Known for: Huisken's monotonicity formula
- Scientific career
- Fields: Mathematics
- Workplaces: Australian National University; University of Tübingen; Max Planck Institute for Gravitational Physics; Mathematical Research Institute of Oberwolfach
- Thesis: Reguläre Kapillarflächen in negativen Gravitationsfeldern (1983)
- Doctoral advisor: Claus Gerhardt
- Doctoral students: Ben Andrews; Simon Brendle

Gerhard Huisken (born 20 May 1958) is a German mathematician whose research concerns differential geometry and partial differential equations. He is known for foundational contributions to the theory of the mean curvature flow, including Huisken's monotonicity formula, which is named after him. With Tom Ilmanen, he proved a version of the Riemannian Penrose inequality, which is a special case of the more general Penrose conjecture in general relativity.

== Education and career ==
After finishing high school in 1977, Huisken took up studies in mathematics at Heidelberg University. In 1982, one year after his diploma graduation, he completed his PhD at the same university under the direction of Claus Gerhardt. The topic of his dissertation were non-linear partial differential equations (Reguläre Kapillarflächen in negativen Gravitationsfeldern).

From 1983 to 1984, Huisken was a researcher at the Centre for Mathematical Analysis at the Australian National University (ANU) in Canberra. There, he turned to differential geometry, in particular problems of mean curvature flows and applications in general relativity. In 1985, he returned to the University of Heidelberg, earning his habilitation in 1986. After some time as a visiting professor at the University of California, San Diego, he returned to ANU from 1986 to 1992, first as a Lecturer, then as a Reader. In 1991, he was a visiting professor at Stanford University. From 1992 to 2002, Huisken was a full professor at the University of Tübingen, serving as dean of the faculty of mathematics from 1996 to 1998. From 1999 to 2000, he was a visiting professor at Princeton University.

In 2002, Huisken became a director at the Max Planck Institute for Gravitational Physics (Albert Einstein Institute) in Potsdam and, at the same time, an honorary professor at the Free University of Berlin. In April 2013, he took up the post of director at the Mathematical Research Institute of Oberwolfach, together with a professorship at Tübingen University. He remains an external scientific member of the Max Planck Institute for Gravitational Physics.

Huisken's PhD students include Ben Andrews and Simon Brendle, among over twenty-five others.

== Work ==
Huisken's work deals with partial differential equations, differential geometry, and their applications in physics. Numerous phenomena in mathematical physics and geometry are related to surfaces and submanifolds. A dominant theme of Huisken's work has been the study of the deformation of such surfaces, in situations where the rules of deformation are determined by the geometry of those surfaces themselves. Such processes are governed by partial differential equations.

Huisken's contributions to mean curvature flow are particularly fundamental. Through his work, the mean curvature flow of hypersurfaces in various convex settings is largely understood. His discovery of Huisken's monotonicity formula, valid for general mean curvature flows, is a particularly important tool.

In the mathematical study of general relativity, Huisken and Tom Ilmanen (ETH Zurich) were able to prove a significant special case of the Riemannian Penrose inequality. Their method of proof also made a decisive contribution to the inverse mean curvature flow. Hubert Bray later proved a more general version of their result with alternative methods. The general version of the conjecture, which is about black holes or apparent horizons in Lorentzian geometry, is still an open problem (as of 2020).

=== Ricci flow ===
Huisken was one of the first authors to consider Richard Hamilton's work on the Ricci flow in higher dimensions. In 1985, Huisken published a version of Hamilton's analysis in arbitrary dimensions, in which Hamilton's assumption of the positivity of Ricci curvature is replaced by a quantitative closeness to constant curvature.^{[H85]} This is measured in terms of the Ricci decomposition. Almost all of Hamilton's main estimates, particularly the gradient estimate for scalar curvature and the eigenvalue pinching estimate, were put by Huisken into the context of general dimensions.

Several years later, the validity of Huisken's convergence theorems were extended to broader curvature conditions via new algebraic ideas of Christoph Böhm and Burkhard Wilking. In a major application of Böhm and Wilking's work, Brendle and Richard Schoen established a new convergence theorem for Ricci flow, containing the long-conjectured differentiable sphere theorem as a special case.

=== Mean curvature flow ===
Huisken is widely known for his foundational work on the mean curvature flow of hypersurfaces. In 1984, he adapted Hamilton's seminal work on the Ricci flow to the setting of mean curvature flow, proving that a normalization of the flow which preserves surface area will deform any smooth closed convex hypersurface of Euclidean space into a round sphere.^{[H84]} The major difference between his work and Hamilton's is that, unlike in Hamilton's work, the relevant equation in the proof of the "pinching estimate" is not amenable to the maximum principle. Instead, Huisken made use of iterative integral methods, following earlier work of the analysts Ennio De Giorgi and Guido Stampacchia. In analogy with Hamilton's result, Huisken's results can be viewed as providing proofs that any smooth closed convex hypersurface of Euclidean space is diffeomorphic to a sphere, and is the boundary of a region which is diffeomorphic to a ball. However, both of these results are elementary via analysis of the Gauss map.

Later, Huisken extended the calculations in his proof to consider hypersurfaces in general Riemannian manifolds.^{[H86]} His result says that if the hypersurface is sufficiently convex relative to the geometry of the Riemannian manifold, then the mean curvature flow will contract it to a point, and that a normalization of surface area in geodesic normal coordinates will give a smooth deformation to a sphere in Euclidean space (as represented by the coordinates). This shows that such hypersurfaces are diffeomorphic to the sphere, and that they are the boundary of a region in the Riemannian manifold which is diffeomorphic to a ball. In this generality, there is not a simple proof using the Gauss map.

In 1987, Huisken adapted his methods to consider an alternative "mean curvature"-driven flow for closed hypersurfaces in Euclidean space, in which the volume enclosed by the surface is kept constant; the result is directly analogous.^{[H87]} Later, in collaboration with Shing-Tung Yau, this work was extended to Riemannian settings.^{[HY96]} The corresponding existence and convergence result of Huisken–Yau illustrates a geometric phenomena of manifolds with positive ADM mass, namely that they are foliated by surfaces of constant mean curvature. With a corresponding uniqueness result, they interpreted this foliation as a measure of center of mass in the theory of general relativity.

Following work of Yoshikazu Giga and Robert Kohn which made extensive use of the Dirichlet energy as weighted by exponentials, Huisken proved in 1990 an integral identity, known as Huisken's monotonicity formula, which shows that, under the mean curvature flow, the integral of the "backwards" Euclidean heat kernel over the evolving hypersurface is always nonincreasing.^{[H90]} He later extended his formula to allow for general codimension and general positive solutions of the "backwards" heat equation; the monotonicity in this generality crucially uses Richard Hamilton's matrix Li–Yau estimate.^{[H93]} An extension to the Riemannian setting was also given by Hamilton. Huisken and Hamilton's ideas were later adapted by Grigori Perelman to the setting of the "backwards" heat equation for volume forms along the Ricci flow.

Huisken and Klaus Ecker made repeated use of the monotonicity result to show that, for a certain class of noncompact graphical hypersurfaces in Euclidean space, the mean curvature flow exists for all positive time and deforms any surface in the class to a self-expanding solution of the mean curvature flow.^{[EH89]} Such a solution moves only by constant rescalings of a single hypersurface. Making use of maximum principle techniques, they were also able to obtain purely local derivative estimates, roughly paralleling those earlier obtained by Wan-Xiong Shi for Ricci flow.^{[EH91]}

Given a finite-time singularity of the mean curvature flow, there are several ways to perform microscopic rescalings to analyze the local geometry in regions near points of large curvature. Based on his monotonicity formula, Huisken showed that many of these regions, specifically those known as type I singularities, are modeled in a precise way by self-shrinking solutions of the mean curvature flow.^{[H90]}

There is now a reasonably complete understanding of the rescaling process in the setting of mean curvature flows which only involve hypersurfaces whose mean curvature is strictly positive. Following provisional work by Huisken, Tobias Colding and William Minicozzi have shown that (with some technical conditions) the only self-shrinking solutions of mean curvature flow which have nonnegative mean curvature are the round cylinders, hence giving a complete local picture of the type I singularities in the "mean-convex" setting.^{[H90]}^{[H93]} In the case of other singular regions, known as type II singularities, Richard Hamilton developed rescaling methods in the setting of Ricci flow which can be transplanted to the mean curvature flow. By modifying the integral methods he developed in 1984, Huisken and Carlo Sinestrari carried out an elaborate inductive argument on the elementary symmetric polynomials of the second fundamental form to show that any singularity model resulting from such rescalings must be a mean curvature flow which moves by translating a single convex hypersurface in some direction.^{[HSS99a]}^{[HS99b]} This passage from mean-convexity to full convexity is comparable with the much easier Hamilton–Ivey estimate for Ricci flow, which says that any singularity model of a Ricci flow on a closed 3-manifold must have nonnegative sectional curvature.

=== Inverse mean curvature flow ===
In the 1970s, the physicists Robert Geroch, Pong-Soo Jang, and Robert Wald developed ideas connecting the asymptotic behavior of inverse mean curvature flow to the validity of the Penrose conjecture, which relates the energy of an asymptotically flat spacetime to the size of the black holes it contains. This can be viewed as a sharpening or quantification of the positive energy theorem, which provides the weaker statement that the energy is nonnegative.

In the 1990s, Yun Gang Chen, Yoshikazu Giga, and Shun'ichi Goto, and independently Lawrence Evans and Joel Spruck, developed a theory of weak solutions for mean curvature flow by considering level sets of solutions of a certain elliptic partial differential equation. Tom Ilmanen made progress on understanding the theory of such elliptic equations, via approximations by elliptic equations of a more standard character. Huisken and Ilmanen were able to adapt these methods to the inverse mean curvature flow, thereby making the methodology of Geroch, Jang, and Wald mathematically precise. Their result deals with noncompact three-dimensional Riemannian manifolds-with-boundary of nonnegative scalar curvature whose boundary is minimal, relating the geometry near infinity to the surface area of the largest boundary component.^{[HI01]} Hubert Bray, by making use of the positive mass theorem instead of the inverse mean curvature flow, was able to improve Huisken and Ilmanen's inequality to involve the total surface area of the boundary.

== Honours and awards ==
Huisken is a fellow of the Heidelberg Academy for Sciences and Humanities, the Berlin-Brandenburg Academy of Sciences and Humanities, the Academy of Sciences Leopoldina, and the American Mathematical Society.

- 1991: Medal of the Australian Mathematical Society
- 1998: invited speaker at the International Congress of Mathematicians
- 2002: Gauss Lecture of the German Mathematical Society
- 2003: Gottfried Wilhelm Leibniz Prize

== Major publications ==
H84.	Huisken, Gerhard (1984). "Flow by mean curvature of convex surfaces into spheres" (PDF). Journal of Differential Geometry. 20 (1): 237–266. doi:10.4310/jdg/1214438998. MR 0772132. Zbl 0556.53001.

H85.	Huisken, Gerhard (1985). "Ricci deformation of the metric on a Riemannian manifold". Journal of Differential Geometry. 21 (1): 47–62. doi:10.4310/jdg/1214439463. MR 0806701. Zbl 0606.53026.

H86.	Huisken, Gerhard (1986). "Contracting convex hypersurfaces in Riemannian manifolds by their mean curvature". Inventiones Mathematicae. 84 (3): 463–480. Bibcode:1986InMat..84..463H. doi:10.1007/BF01388742. hdl:11858/00-001M-0000-0013-592E-F. MR 0837523. S2CID 55451410. Zbl 0589.53058.

H87.	Huisken, Gerhard (1987). "The volume preserving mean curvature flow". Journal für die reine und angewandte Mathematik. 1987 (382): 35–48. doi:10.1515/crll.1987.382.35. hdl:11858/00-001M-0000-0013-5DAA-8. MR 0921165. S2CID 118368038. Zbl 0621.53007.

EH89.	Ecker, Klaus; Huisken, Gerhard (1989). "Mean curvature evolution of entire graphs". Annals of Mathematics. Second Series. 130 (3): 453–471. doi:10.2307/1971452. hdl:11858/00-001M-0000-0013-5D0F-6. JSTOR 1971452. MR 1025164. Zbl 0696.53036.

H89.	Huisken, Gerhard (1989). "Nonparametric mean curvature evolution with boundary conditions". Journal of Differential Equations. 77 (2): 369–378. Bibcode:1989JDE....77..369H. doi:10.1016/0022-0396(89)90149-6. hdl:11858/00-001M-0000-0013-5D38-6. MR 0983300. Zbl 0686.34013.

H90.	Huisken, Gerhard (1990). "Asymptotic behavior for singularities of the mean curvature flow". Journal of Differential Geometry. 31 (1): 285–299. doi:10.4310/jdg/1214444099. hdl:11858/00-001M-0000-0013-5CFE-3. MR 1030675. Zbl 0694.53005.

EH91.	Ecker, Klaus; Huisken, Gerhard (1991). "Interior estimates for hypersurfaces moving by mean curvature". Inventiones Mathematicae. 105 (3): 547–569. Bibcode:1991InMat.105..547E. doi:10.1007/BF01232278. hdl:11858/00-001M-0000-0013-5CAC-A. MR 1117150. S2CID 122642136. Zbl 0707.53008.

H93.	Huisken, Gerhard (1993). "Local and global behaviour of hypersurfaces moving by mean curvature". In Greene, Robert; Yau, S. T. (eds.). Differential Geometry: Partial Differential Equations on Manifolds. American Mathematical Society Summer Institute on Differential Geometry (University of California, Los Angeles, July 9–27, 1990). Proceedings of Symposia in Pure Mathematics. Vol. 54. Providence, RI: American Mathematical Society. pp. 175–191. doi:10.1090/pspum/054.1. ISBN 9780821814949. MR 1216584. Zbl 0791.58090.

HY96.	Huisken, Gerhard; Yau, Shing-Tung (1996). "Definition of center of mass for isolated physical systems and unique foliations by stable spheres with constant mean curvature". Inventiones Mathematicae. 124 (1–3): 281–311. Bibcode:1996InMat.124..281H. doi:10.1007/s002220050054. hdl:11858/00-001M-0000-0013-5B63-3. MR 1369419. S2CID 122669931. Zbl 0858.53071.

HP99.	Huisken, Gerhard; Polden, Alexander (1999). "Geometric evolution equations for hypersurfaces". In Hildebrandt, S.; Struwe, M. (eds.). Calculus of Variations and Geometric Evolution Problems. Second Session of the Centro Internazionale Matematico Estivo (Cetraro, Italy, June 15–22, 1996). Lecture Notes in Mathematics. Vol. 1713. Berlin: Springer. pp. 45–84. doi:10.1007/BFb0092667. ISBN 978-3-540-65977-8. MR 1731639. Zbl 0942.35047.

HS99a.	Huisken, Gerhard; Sinestrari, Carlo (1999). "Mean curvature flow singularities for mean convex surfaces". Calculus of Variations and Partial Differential Equations. 8 (1): 1–14. doi:10.1007/s005260050113. hdl:11858/00-001M-0000-0013-5853-1. MR 1666878. S2CID 1692710. Zbl 0992.53052.

HS99b.	Huisken, Gerhard; Sinestrari, Carlo (1999). "Convexity estimates for mean curvature flow and singularities of mean convex surfaces". Acta Mathematica. 183 (1): 45–70. doi:10.1007/BF02392946. MR 1719551. Zbl 0992.53051.

HI01.	Huisken, Gerhard; Ilmanen, Tom (2001). "The inverse mean curvature flow and the Riemannian Penrose inequality". Journal of Differential Geometry. 59 (3): 353–437. doi:10.4310/jdg/1090349447. hdl:11858/00-001M-0000-0013-5581-4. MR 1916951. Zbl 1055.53052.
