= Mean curvature flow =

Parabolic partial differential equation

In the field of differential geometry in mathematics, mean curvature flow is an example of a geometric flow of hypersurfaces in a Riemannian manifold (for example, smooth surfaces in 3-dimensional Euclidean space). Intuitively, a family of surfaces evolves under mean curvature flow if the normal component of the velocity of which a point on the surface moves is given by the mean curvature of the surface. For example, a round sphere evolves under mean curvature flow by shrinking inward uniformly (since the mean curvature vector of a sphere points inward). Except in special cases, the mean curvature flow develops singularities.

Under the constraint that volume enclosed is constant, this is called surface tension flow.

It is a parabolic partial differential equation, and can be interpreted as "smoothing".

== Existence and uniqueness ==
The following was shown by Michael Gage and Richard S. Hamilton as an application of Hamilton's general existence theorem for parabolic geometric flows.

Let $M$ be a compact smooth manifold, let $(M',g)$ be a complete smooth Riemannian manifold, and let $f:M\to M'$ be a smooth immersion. Then there is a positive number $T$, which could be infinite, and a map $F:[0,T)\times M\to M'$ with the following properties:

- $F(0,\cdot)=f$
- $F(t,\cdot):M\to M'$ is a smooth immersion for any $t\in[0,T)$
- as $t\searrow 0,$ one has $F(t,\cdot)\to f$ in $C^\infty$
- for any $(t_0,p)\in(0,T)\times M$, the derivative of the curve $t\mapsto F(t,p)$ at $t_0$ is equal to the mean curvature vector of $F(t_0,\cdot)$ at $p$.
- if $\widetilde{F}:[0,\widetilde{T})\times M\to M'$ is any other map with the four properties above, then $\widetilde{T}\leq T$ and $\widetilde{F}(t,p)=F(t,p)$ for any $(t,p)\in [0,\widetilde{T})\times M.$

Necessarily, the restriction of $F$ to $(0,T)\times M$ is $C^\infty$.

One refers to $F$ as the (maximally extended) mean curvature flow with initial data $f$.

== Convex solutions ==
Following Hamilton's epochal 1982 work on the Ricci flow, in 1984 Gerhard Huisken employed the same methods for the mean curvature flow to produce the following analogous result:

- If $(M',g)$ is the Euclidean space $\mathbb{R}^{n+1}$, where $n\geq 2$ denotes the dimension of $M$, then $T$ is necessarily finite. If the second fundamental form of the 'initial immersion' $f$ is strictly positive, then the second fundamental form of the immersion $F(t,\cdot)$ is also strictly positive for every $t\in(0,T)$, and furthermore if one choose the function $c:(0,T)\to(0,\infty)$ such that the volume of the Riemannian manifold $(M,(c(t)F(t,\cdot))^\ast g_{\text{Euc}})$ is independent of $t$, then as $t\nearrow T$ the immersions $c(t)F(t,\cdot):M\to\mathbb{R}^{n+1}$ smoothly converge to an immersion whose image in $\mathbb{R}^{n+1}$ is a round sphere.

Note that if $n\geq 2$ and $f:M\to\mathbb{R}^{n+1}$ is a smooth hypersurface immersion whose second fundamental form is positive, then the Gauss map $\nu:M\to S^n$ is a diffeomorphism, and so one knows from the start that $M$ is diffeomorphic to $S^n$ and, from elementary differential topology, that all immersions considered above are embeddings.

Gage and Hamilton extended Huisken's result to the case $n=1$. Matthew Grayson (1987) showed that if $f:S^1\to\mathbb{R}^2$ is any smooth embedding, then the mean curvature flow with initial data $f$ eventually consists exclusively of embeddings with strictly positive curvature, at which point Gage and Hamilton's result applies. In summary:

- If $f:S^1\to\mathbb{R}^2$ is a smooth embedding, then consider the mean curvature flow $F:[0,T)\times S^1\to\mathbb{R}^2$ with initial data $f$. Then $F(t,\cdot):S^1\to\mathbb{R}^2$ is a smooth embedding for every $t\in(0,T)$ and there exists $t_0\in(0,T)$ such that $F(t,\cdot):S^1\to\mathbb{R}^2$ has positive (extrinsic) curvature for every $t\in(t_0,T)$. If one selects the function $c$ as in Huisken's result, then as $t\nearrow T$ the embeddings $c(t)F(t,\cdot):S^1\to\mathbb{R}^2$ converge smoothly to an embedding whose image is a round circle.

== Properties ==
The mean curvature flow extremalizes surface area, and minimal surfaces are the critical points for the mean curvature flow; minima solve the isoperimetric problem.

For manifolds embedded in a Kähler–Einstein manifold, if the surface is a Lagrangian submanifold, the mean curvature flow is of Lagrangian type, so the surface evolves within the class of Lagrangian submanifolds.

Huisken's monotonicity formula gives a monotonicity property of the convolution of a time-reversed heat kernel with a surface undergoing the mean curvature flow.

Related flows are:

- Curve-shortening flow, the one-dimensional case of mean curvature flow
- the surface tension flow
- the Lagrangian mean curvature flow
- the inverse mean curvature flow

== Mean curvature flow of a 2D surface ==
For a 2D surface embedded in $\mathbb{R}^3$ as $z=S(x,y)$ , the differential equation for mean-curvature flow is given by

$$\frac{\partial S}{\partial t} = 2D\ H(x,y) \sqrt{1 + \left(\frac{\partial S}{\partial x}\right)^2 + \left(\frac{\partial S}{\partial y}\right)^2}$$

with $D$ being a constant relating the curvature and the speed of the surface normal, and the mean curvature being

$$\begin{align}
H(x,y) & =
\frac{1}{2}\frac{
\left(1 + \left(\frac{\partial S}{\partial x}\right)^2\right) \frac{\partial^2 S}{\partial y^2} -
2 \frac{\partial S}{\partial x} \frac{\partial S}{\partial y} \frac{\partial^2 S}{\partial x \partial y} +
\left(1 + \left(\frac{\partial S}{\partial y}\right)^2\right) \frac{\partial^2 S}{\partial x^2}
}{\left(1 + \left(\frac{\partial S}{\partial x}\right)^2 + \left(\frac{\partial S}{\partial y}\right)^2\right)^{3/2}}.
\end{align}$$

In the limits $\left|\frac{\partial S}{\partial x}\right| \ll 1$ and $\left|\frac{\partial S}{\partial y}\right| \ll 1$, so that the surface is nearly planar with its normal nearly parallel to the z axis, this reduces to a diffusion equation

$$\frac{\partial S}{\partial t} = D\ \nabla^2 S$$

While the conventional diffusion equation is a linear parabolic partial differential equation and does not develop singularities (when run forward in time), mean curvature flow may develop singularities because it is a nonlinear parabolic equation. In general additional constraints need to be put on a surface to prevent singularities under mean curvature flows.

Every smooth convex surface collapses to a point under the mean-curvature flow, without other singularities, and converges to the shape of a sphere as it does so. For surfaces of dimension two or more this is a theorem of Gerhard Huisken; for the one-dimensional curve-shortening flow it is the Gage–Hamilton–Grayson theorem. However, there exist embedded surfaces of two or more dimensions other than the sphere that stay self-similar as they contract to a point under the mean-curvature flow, including the Angenent torus.

== Example: mean curvature flow of m-dimensional spheres ==
A simple example of mean curvature flow is given by a family of concentric round hyperspheres in $\mathbb{R}^{m+1}$. The mean curvature of an $m$-dimensional sphere of radius $R$ is $H = m/R$.

Due to the rotational symmetry of the sphere (or in general, due to the invariance of mean curvature under isometries) the mean curvature flow equation $\partial_t F = - H \nu$ reduces to the ordinary differential equation, for an initial sphere of radius $R_0$,

$$\begin{align}
\frac{\text{d}}{\text{d}t}R(t) & = - \frac{m}{R(t)} , \\
R(0) & = R_0 .
\end{align}$$

The solution of this ODE (obtained, e.g., by separation of variables) is

$$R(t) = \sqrt{R_0^2 - 2 m t}$$,

which exists for $t \in (-\infty,R_0^2/2m)$.

== See also ==
- Curve-shortening flow
