= Christine Guenther =

American mathematician

Christine Guenther is an American mathematician known for her research on the differential geometry of manifolds, including the Ricci flow. She is a distinguished professor of mathematics at Pacific University.

Guenther graduated from Stanford University in 1989 with a bachelor's degree in music. After earning a master's degree in mathematics in 1993 from the University of Washington, she completed her Ph.D. in 1998 at the University of Oregon, under the supervision of James A. Isenberg. She joined the Pacific University faculty in 1988 and became a Distinguished University Professor at Pacific University in 2016.

She is a co-author of the four-volume book series Ricci Flow: Techniques and Applications (American Mathematical Society, 2007, 2008, 2010, and 2015) and of Extrinsic Geometric Flows (Graduate Studies in Mathematics 206, 2020).
