= Michael Gage (mathematician) =

Michael Eaton Gage is a mathematician who works as a professor of mathematics at the University of Rochester. He is known for his work on the curve-shortening flow, and in particular for the Gage–Hamilton–Grayson theorem, proved by Gage with Richard S. Hamilton and Matthew Grayson, which describes the behavior of any smooth Jordan curve under the curve-shortening flow. He is also one of the original developers of the WeBWorK online homework delivery system.

Gage did his undergraduate studies at Antioch College, and completed his Ph.D. in mathematics at Stanford University in 1978, under the supervision of Robert Osserman. He has worked as a systems programmer for Intel, and joined the Rochester faculty in 1984.

Gage was the 1996–1997 winner of the distinguished teaching award of the Seaway Section of the Mathematical Association of America.
