= Huisken's monotonicity formula =

In differential geometry, Huisken's monotonicity formula states that, if an n-dimensional surface in (n + 1)-dimensional Euclidean space undergoes the mean curvature flow, then its convolution with an appropriately scaled and time-reversed heat kernel is non-increasing. The result is named after Gerhard Huisken, who published it in 1990.

Specifically, the (n + 1)-dimensional time-reversed heat kernel converging to a point x_{0} at time t_{0} may be given by the formula

$$u(x,t) = \frac{1}{(4\pi (t_0-t))^{n/2}}\exp\left(-\frac{|x-x_0|^2}{4(t_0-t)}\right).$$

Then Huisken's monotonicity formula gives an explicit expression for the derivative of

$$\int u(x,t) d\mu,$$

where μ is the area element of the evolving surface at time t. The expression involves the negation of another integral, whose integrand is non-negative, so the derivative is non-positive.

Typically, x_{0} and t_{0} are chosen as the time and position of a singularity of the evolving surface, and the monotonicity formula can be used to analyze the behavior of the surface as it evolves towards this singularity. In particular, the only surfaces for which the convolution with the heat kernel remains constant rather than decreasing are ones that stay self-similar as they evolve, and the monotonicity formula can be used to classify these surfaces.

Grigori Perelman derived analogous formulas for the Ricci flow.
