= Ancient solution =

In mathematics, an ancient solution to a differential equation is a solution that can be extrapolated backwards to all past times, without singularities. That is, it is a solution "that is defined on a time interval of the form (−∞, T)."

The term was introduced by Richard Hamilton in his work on the Ricci flow. It has since been applied to other geometric flows as well as to other systems such as the Navier–Stokes equations and heat equation.
