= Hubert Bray =

American mathematician and physicist

Hubert Lewis Bray is an American mathematician. A differential geometer, he is known for proving the Riemannian Penrose inequality in 1999. He works as professor of mathematics and physics at Duke University, specializing in differential geometry.

== Early life and education ==
In 1988, after placing 4th in the USA Math Olympiad, Bray achieved a bronze medal in the International Math Olympiad. In 1991, as an undergraduate student at Rice University, he was awarded the Hubert Evelyn Bray Prize in Mathematics, named after his grandfather, who was the first PhD recipient of Rice Institute. He earned his B.A. and B.S. degrees in Mathematics and Physics in 1992 from Rice University and obtained his Ph.D. in 1997 from Stanford University under the mentorship of Richard Melvin Schoen.

== Career ==
He was an invited speaker at the 2002 International Congress of Mathematicians in Beijing (in the section of differential geometry).

He is one of the inaugural fellows of the American Mathematical Society.

Hubert was appointed professor of mathematics in 2004, an additionally professor of physics in 2019. In 2019, he was appointed director of undergraduate studies of Duke's mathematics department.

== Personal life ==
Hubert is the grandson of Hubert Evelyn Bray, professor of mathematics at Rice University and the first person awarded a Ph.D. by the then Rice Institute.

Hubert Bray and his brother Clark Bray share similar educations and jobs, both having studied at Rice University (undergraduate), Stanford University (graduate), and are professors of mathematics at Duke University.
