= Geometric flow =

In the mathematical field of differential geometry, a geometric flow, also called a geometric evolution equation, is a type of partial differential equation for a geometric object such as a Riemannian metric or an embedding. It is not a term with a formal meaning, but is typically understood to refer to parabolic partial differential equations.

Certain geometric flows arise as the gradient flow associated with a functional on a manifold which has a geometric interpretation, usually associated with some extrinsic or intrinsic curvature. Such flows are fundamentally related to the calculus of variations, and include mean curvature flow and Yamabe flow.

== Examples ==
=== Extrinsic ===
Extrinsic geometric flows are flows on embedded submanifolds, or more generally immersed submanifolds. In general they change both the Riemannian metric and the immersion.

- Mean curvature flow, as in soap films; critical points are minimal surfaces
- Curve-shortening flow, the one-dimensional case of the mean curvature flow
- Willmore flow, as in minimax eversions of spheres
- Inverse mean curvature flow

=== Intrinsic ===
Intrinsic geometric flows are flows on the Riemannian metric, independent of any embedding or immersion.

- Ricci flow, as in the solution of the Poincaré conjecture, and Richard S. Hamilton's proof of the uniformization theorem
- Calabi flow, a flow for Kähler metrics
- Yamabe flow

== Classes of flows ==
Important classes of flows are curvature flows, variational flows (which extremize some functional), and flows arising as solutions to parabolic partial differential equations. A given flow frequently admits all of these interpretations, as follows.

Given an elliptic operator $L,$ the parabolic PDE $u_t = Lu$ yields a flow, and stationary states for the flow are solutions to the elliptic partial differential equation $Lu = 0.$

If the equation $Lu = 0$ is the Euler–Lagrange equation for some functional $F,$ then the flow has a variational interpretation as the gradient flow of $F,$ and stationary states of the flow correspond to critical points of the functional.

In the context of geometric flows, the functional is often the $L^2$ norm of some curvature.

Thus, given a curvature $K,$ one can define the functional $F(K) = \|K\|_2 := \left(\int_M K^2\right)^{1/2},$ which has Euler–Lagrange equation $Lu=0$ for some elliptic operator $L,$ and associated parabolic PDE $u_t = Lu.$

The Ricci flow, Calabi flow, and Yamabe flow arise in this way (in some cases with normalizations).

Curvature flows may or may not preserve volume (the Calabi flow does, while the Ricci flow does not), and if not, the flow may simply shrink or grow the manifold, rather than regularizing the metric. Thus one often normalizes the flow, for instance, by fixing the volume.

== See also ==
- Harmonic map heat flow
- Curve-shortening flow
