= BPS =

BPS, Bps or bps may refer to:

== Science and mathematics ==
- Plural of bp, base pair, a measure of length of DNA
- Plural of bp, basis point, one one-hundredth of a percentage point - ‱
- Battered person syndrome, a physical and psychological condition found in victims of abuse
- Best practice statement, a qualification of a method used in guidelines documents
- Bisphenol S, an organic chemical compound
- Bladder pain syndrome, a disorder characterised by pain associated with urination
- Bogomol'nyi–Prasad–Sommerfield bound, a mathematical concept in field and string theory
- Bogomol'nyi–Prasad–Sommerfield state, solutions saturating the BPS bound
- BPS domain, a protein domain
- Bronchopulmonary sequestration, where a section of lung tissue has a decreased blood supply
- Bovine papular stomatitis, a zoonotic farmyard pox

== Computing ==
- IBM Basic Programming Support, BPS/360
- Bits per second (bit/s, sometimes abbreviated bps), a data rate unit
- Bytes per second (B/s, sometimes abbreviated Bps), a data rate unit
- Bits per sample (bps), referring to color depth

== Organizations ==
- Badan Pusat Statistik, Indonesian statistical survey institute
- Banco de Previsión Social, Uruguayan state-owned social security institute
- Barbados Postal Service, national postal agency of Barbados
- Biophysical Society, scientific society
- Bosnian-Herzegovinian Patriotic Party-Sefer Halilović, a mayor Bosnian political party
- Botswana Prison Service, corrections agency of Botswana
- British Psychological Society, the representative body for psychologists and psychology in the United Kingdom
- British Pteridological Society, the focal point for fern enthusiasts throughout the United Kingdom
- Buddhist Publication Society, a charity aiming to spread the teachings of Buddha
- Board of Pharmacy Specialties, a certification agency for specialized pharmacists
- Bullet-Proof Software, a Japanese video game developer

=== Education ===
- Barnsdall Public Schools, Oklahoma, US school district
- Belilios Public School, a government secondary school in Hong Kong
- Bellingham Public Schools, public school district in Bellingham, Washington, U.S.
- Belmont Public Schools, Massachusetts, US school district
- Bismarck Public Schools, North Dakota, US school district
- Boston Public Schools, a school district in Boston, Massachusetts, United States
- British Parachute Schools, a parachuting drop zone in Nottinghamshire, England
- Brockton Public Schools, the school district serving Brockton, Massachusetts, US
- Birmingham City School District or Birmingham Public Schools, Michigan, US
- Brainerd Public Schools, Brainerd, Minnesota, US

== Other uses ==
- Bachelor of Professional Studies, an undergraduate degree
- Battle Programmer Shirase, an anime television series
- Baltic Pipeline System, an oil transport system in Eastern Europe
- Bohlen–Pierce–Stearns, a non-octave musical temperament
- Biopsychosocial model, an interdisciplinary model that examines the interconnection between biology, psychology, and socio-environmental factors
- Porto Seguro Airport, Brazil, IATA code
- Basic Pay Scale, public sector term for the grade of an official in Pakistan
- BPS grade tea
- BLAST Pro Series, a Counter-Strike: Global Offensive tournament
- Broadcast Positioning System, a proposal to improve the ATSC 3.0 television standard to provide navigation services

== See also ==
- BP (disambiguation) (for BPs)
