= Deligne's conjecture on Hochschild cohomology =

In deformation theory, a branch of mathematics, Deligne's conjecture is about the operadic structure on Hochschild cochain complex. Various proofs have been suggested by Dmitry Tamarkin, (Note: Some sources cite Tamarkin's proof as the first real proof.) Alexander A. Voronov, James E. McClure and Jeffrey H. Smith, Maxim Kontsevich and Yan Soibelman, and others, after an initial input of construction of homotopy algebraic structures on the Hochschild complex. It is of importance in relation with string theory.

== See also ==
- Piecewise algebraic space
