= Piecewise algebraic space =

Generalization of a semialgebraic set

In mathematics, a piecewise algebraic space is a generalization of a semialgebraic set, introduced by Maxim Kontsevich and Yan Soibelman. The motivation was for the proof of Deligne's conjecture on Hochschild cohomology. Robert Hardt, Pascal Lambrechts, Victor Turchin, and Ismar Volić later developed the theory.
