= Yan Soibelman =

Russian mathematician

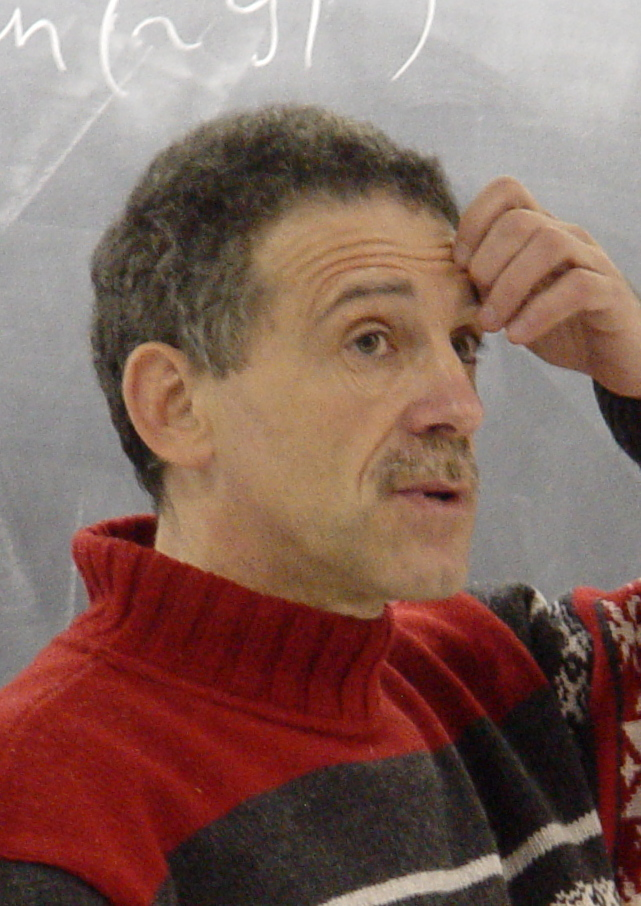
Yan Soibelman 2006

Iakov (Yan) Soibelman (Russian: Яков Семенович Сойбельман) born 15 April 1956 (Kiev, USSR) is a Russian American mathematician, professor at Kansas State University (Manhattan, USA), member of the Kyiv Mathematical Society (Ukraine), founder of Manhattan Mathematical Olympiad.

== Scientific work ==
Yan Soibelman is a specialist in theory of quantum groups, representation theory and symplectic geometry. He introduced the notion of quantum Weyl group, studied representation theory of the algebras of functions on compact quantum groups, and meromorphic braided monoidal categories. His long term collaboration with Maxim Kontsevich is devoted to various aspects of homological mirror symmetry, a proof of Deligne conjecture about operations on the cohomological Hochschild complex, a direct construction of Calabi-Yau varieties based on SYZ conjecture and non-archimedean geometry, and more recently to Donaldson-Thomas theory. Together with Kontsevich he laid the foundation and developed the theory of motivic Donaldson-Thomas invariants. Kontsevich-Soibelman wall-crossing formula for Donaldson-Thomas invariants (a.k.a BPS invariants) found important applications in physics. They also introduced the notion of Cohomological Hall algebra which has numerous applications in geometric representation theory and quantum physics.

== See also ==
- bio
- Yan Soibelman's papers posted to math archives
- Manhattan Mathematical Olympiad, past years problems
