= Šešum =

Šešum is a surname. Notable people with this surname include:

- Nataša Šešum, American mathematician
- Žarko Šešum (born 1986), Serbian handball player
