= Sheldon Katz =

American mathematician (born 1956)

Sheldon H. Katz (19 December 1956, Brooklyn) is an American mathematician, specializing in algebraic geometry and its applications to string theory.

== Background and career ==
In 1973 Katz won first prize in the U.S.A. Mathematical Olympiad. He received in 1976 his bachelor's degree from MIT and in 1980 his Ph.D. from Princeton University under Robert C. Gunning with thesis Deformations of Linear Systems, Divisors and Weierstrass Points on Curves. At the University of Utah, he was an instructor from 1980 to 1984. At the University of Oklahoma he was an assistant professor from 1984 to 1987. At Oklahoma State University, he became in 1987 an assistant professor, in 1989 an associate professor, in 1994 a full professor, in 1997 Southwestern Bell Professor, and in 1999 Regents Professor. Since 2001 he has been a professor at the University of Illinois, Urbana-Champaign, where he was chair of the department in 2006–2011.

For the academic year 1982/83 he was a visiting scholar at the Institute for Advanced Study. He was a visiting professor at the Mittag-Leffler Institute (1997), at Duke University (1991/92) and at the University of Bayreuth (1989).

His research on algebraic geometry and its applications to string theory (including mirror symmetry) and supersymmetry has been published in prestigious journals in mathematics and physics.

In 2013 he was elected a Fellow of the American Mathematical Society.

== Selected publications ==
=== Articles ===
- with Bruce Crauder: Crauder, Bruce; Katz, Sheldon (1989). "Cremona transformations with smooth irreducible fundamental locus". American Journal of Mathematics. 111 (2): 289–307. doi:10.2307/2374511. JSTOR 2374511.
- with Alberto Albano: Albano, Alberto; Katz, Sheldon (1991). "Lines on the Fermat quintic threefold and the infinitesimal generalized Hodge conjecture". Trans. Amer. Math. Soc. 324 (1): 353–368. doi:10.1090/s0002-9947-1991-1024767-6. MR 1024767.
- with David R. Morrison and M. Ronen Plesser: Katz, Sheldon; Morrison, David R.; Plesser, M.Ronen (1996). "Enhanced gauge symmetry in type 11 string theory". Nuclear Physics B. 477 (1): 105–140. arXiv:hep-th/9601108. Bibcode:1996NuPhB.477..105K. doi:10.1016/0550-3213(96)00331-8. S2CID 14482596.
- with Eric Sharpe: Katz, Sheldon; Sharpe, Eric (2003). "D-branes, open string vertex operators, and Ext groups". Adv. Theor. Math. Phys. 6 (6): 979–1030. arXiv:hep-th/0208104. Bibcode:2002hep.th....8104K. doi:10.4310/ATMP.2002.v6.n6.a1. S2CID 14199444.
- with Tony Pantev and E. Sharpe: Katz, Sheldon; Pantev, Tony; Sharpe, Eric (2003). "D-branes, orbifolds, and Ext groups". Nuclear Physics B. 673 (1): 263–300. arXiv:hep-th/0212218. Bibcode:2003NuPhB.673..263K. doi:10.1016/j.nuclphysb.2003.09.022. S2CID 17710799.
- with Andrei Caldararu and E. Sharpe: Caldararu, Andrei; Katz, Sheldon; Sharpe, Eric (2004). "D-branes, B fields, and Ext groups". Advances in Theoretical and Mathematical Physics. 7 (3): 381–404. arXiv:hep-th/0302099. doi:10.4310/atmp.2003.v7.n3.a1. S2CID 7443345.
- with Ron Donagi and E. Sharpe: Donagi, Ron; Katz, Sheldon; Sharpe, Eric (2005). "Spectra of D-branes with Higgs vevs". Advances in Theoretical and Mathematical Physics. 8 (5): 813–859. arXiv:hep-th/0309270. doi:10.4310/atmp.2004.v8.n5.a3. S2CID 229996.
- with D. Morrison, Sakura Schäfer-Nameki, and James Sully: Katz, Sheldon; Morrison, David R.; Schäfer-Nameki, Sakura; Sully, James (2011). "Tate's algorithm and F-theory". JHEP. 94 (8): 1108. arXiv:1106.3854. Bibcode:2011JHEP...08..094K. doi:10.1007/JHEP08(2011)094. S2CID 119184488.
- with Jinwon Choi and Albrecht Klemm: Choi, Jinwon; Katz, Sheldon; Klemm, Albrecht (2014). "The refined BPS index from stable pair invariants". Communications in Mathematical Physics. 328 (3): 903–954. arXiv:1210.4403. Bibcode:2014CMaPh.328..903C. doi:10.1007/s00220-014-1978-0. S2CID 119708881.

=== Books ===
- with Rahul Pandharipande, Cumrun Vafa, Ravi Vakil, Eric Zaslow, Kentaro Hori, Albrecht Klemm, Richard Thomas: Mirror Symmetry, Clay Mathematics Monographs, vol. 1, 2003
- with David A. Cox: Mirror Symmetry and Algebraic Geometry. AMS. 1999. ISBN 9780821821275.
- Enumerative Geometry and String Theory. Student Mathematical Library. AMS. 2006. ISBN 9780821836873.
