= Mark Gross (mathematician) =

American mathematician (born 1965)

Mark Gross FRS
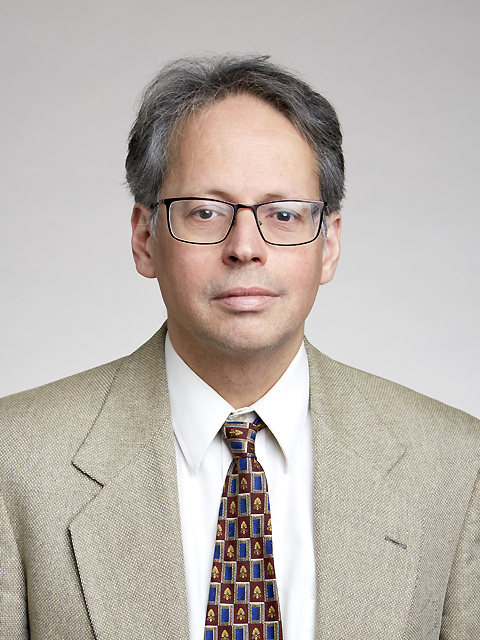
- Gross in 2017
- Born: November 30, 1965 (age 60); Ithaca, New York, U.S.
- Education: Cornell University; University of California, Berkeley (PhD)
- Awards: Clay Research Award (2016); Fellow of the Royal Society (2017)
- Scientific career
- Workplaces: University of Cambridge; University of Michigan; Cornell University; University of California, San Diego; University of Warwick
- Thesis: Surfaces in the Four-Dimensional Grassmannian (1990)
- Doctoral advisor: Robin Hartshorne
- Website: dpmms.cam.ac.uk/people/mg475/ www.dpmms.cam.ac.uk/~mg475/

Mark William Gross FRS (born 30 November 1965) is an American mathematician, specializing in differential geometry, algebraic geometry, and mirror symmetry.

== Early life and education ==
Mark William Gross was born on 30 November 1965 in Ithaca, New York, to Leonard Gross and Grazyna Gross. From 1982, he studied at Cornell University, graduating with a bachelor's degree in 1984. He gained a PhD in 1990 from the University of California, Berkeley, for research supervised by Robin Hartshorne with a thesis on the surfaces in the four-dimensional Grassmannian.

== Career ==
From 1990 to 1993 he was an assistant professor at the University of Michigan and spent the academic year 1992–1993 on leave as a postdoctoral researcher at the Mathematical Sciences Research Institute (MSRI) in Berkeley. He was at Cornell University in 1993–1997 an assistant professor and in 1997–2001 an associate professor and then at University of California, San Diego in 2001–2013 a full professor. He was a visiting professor at the University of Warwick in the academic year 2002–2003. Since 2013, he has been a professor at the University of Cambridge and since 2016, a Fellow of King's College, Cambridge.

== Research ==
Gross works on complex geometry, algebraic geometry, and mirror symmetry. Gross and Bernd Siebert jointly developed a program (known as the Gross–Siebert Program) for studying mirror symmetry within algebraic geometry.

The Gross–Siebert program builds on an earlier, differential-geometric, proposal of Strominger, Yau, and Zaslow, in which the Calabi–Yau manifold is fibred by special Lagrangian tori, and the mirror by dual tori. The program's central idea is to translate this into an algebro-geometric construction in an appropriate limit, involving combinatorial data associated with a degenerating family of Calabi–Yau manifolds. It draws on many areas of geometry, analysis and combinatorics and has made a deep impact on fields such as tropical and non-archimedean geometry, logarithmic geometry, the calculation of Gromov–Witten invariants, the theory of cluster algebras and combinatorial representation theory.

== Selected publications ==
- Topological Mirror Symmetry, Inventiones Mathematicae, vol. 144, 2001, pp. 75–137, arXiv:math/9909015
- with D. Joyce, D. Huybrechts (eds.), Calabi–Yau Manifolds and related Geometries (Nordfjordeid 2001), Springer MR 1963559; 2012 reprint ISBN 978-3-540-44059-8
- with B. Siebert: From real affine geometry to complex geometry, Annals of Mathematics, vol. 174, 2011, pp. 1301–1428, arXiv:math/0703822
- with Paul S. Aspinwall, Tom Bridgeland, Alastair Craw, Michael R. Douglas, Anton Kapustin, Gregory W. Moore, Graeme Segal, Balázs Szendrői, and P. M. H. Wilson: Dirichlet branes and Mirror Symmetry, Clay Mathematics Monographs 4, 2009
- Tropical geometry and mirror symmetry Archived 2016-09-10 at the Wayback Machine, CBMS Regional conference series in Mathematics 114, AMS, 2011 MR 2722115
- Mirror Symmetry for $P^2$ and Tropical Geometry, Preprint 2009, arXiv:0903.1378
- The Strominger–Yau–Zaslow conjecture: From torus fibrations to degenerations, AMS Symposium Algebraic Geometry, Seattle 2005, Preprint 2008, arXiv:0802.3407
- Mirror Symmetry and the Strominger–Yau–Zaslow conjecture, Current Developments in Mathematics 2012, arXiv:1212.4220

=== Awards and honors ===
Gross was an Invited Speaker, jointly with Siebert, with talk Local mirror symmetry in the tropics at the International Congress of Mathematicians in Seoul 2014. In 2016 Gross and Siebert jointly received the Clay Research Award. Gross was elected a Fellow of the Royal Society in 2017.
