= Tian Gang =

Chinese mathematician (born 1958)

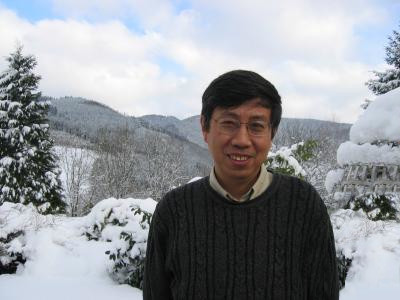
- Tian at Oberwolfach in 2005
- Born: 24 November 1958 (age 67); Nanjing, Jiangsu, China
- Education: Nanjing University (BS); Peking University (MS); Harvard University (PhD)
- Known for: Yau-Tian-Donaldson conjecture K-stability; K-stability of Fano varieties
- Awards: Veblen Prize (1996); Alan T. Waterman Award (1994)
- Scientific career
- Fields: Mathematics
- Workplaces: Princeton University; Peking University
- Thesis: Kähler Metrics on Algebraic Manifolds (1988)
- Doctoral advisor: Shing-Tung Yau
- Doctoral students: Aaron Naber; Nataša Šešum; Wei Dongyi

Chinese name
- Traditional Chinese: 田剛
- Simplified Chinese: 田刚
Transcriptions
Standard Mandarin
- Hanyu Pinyin: Tián Gāng

Tian Gang (Chinese: 田刚; pinyin: Tián Gāng; born November 24, 1958) is a Chinese mathematician known for his contributions to the mathematical fields of Kähler geometry, Gromov–Witten theory, and geometric analysis. He is a professor of mathematics at Peking University and the Higgins Professor Emeritus at Princeton University.

As of 2020, he is the Vice Chairman of the China Democratic League and the President of the Chinese Mathematical Society. From 2017 to 2019 he served as the Vice President of Peking University.

== Biography ==
Tian was born in Nanjing, Jiangsu, China, on November 24, 1958. In 1978, after the Cultural Revolution, he qualified in the second Gaokao exam. He graduated from Nanjing University with a Bachelor of Science in mathematics in 1982, earned a Master of Science in mathematics from Peking University in 1984, and earned his Ph.D. in mathematics from Harvard University in 1988 under the supervision of Shing-Tung Yau.

In 1998, he was appointed as a Cheung Kong Scholar professor at Peking University. Later his appointment was changed to Cheung Kong Scholar chair professorship. He was a professor of mathematics at the Massachusetts Institute of Technology from 1995 to 2006 (holding the chair of Simons Professor of Mathematics from 1996). His employment at Princeton started from 2003, and was later appointed the Higgins Professor of Mathematics. Starting 2005, he has been the director of the Beijing International Center for Mathematical Research (BICMR); from 2013 to 2017 he was the Dean of School of Mathematical Sciences at Peking University. He and John Milnor are Senior Scholars of the Clay Mathematics Institute (CMI). In 2011, Tian became director of the Sino-French Research Program in Mathematics at the Centre national de la recherche scientifique (CNRS) in Paris. In 2010, he became scientific consultant for the International Center for Theoretical Physics in Trieste, Italy.

Tian has served on many committees, including for the Abel Prize and the Leroy P. Steele Prize. He is a member of the editorial boards of many journals, including Advances in Mathematics and the Journal of Geometric Analysis. In the past he has been on the editorial boards of the Annals of Mathematics and the Journal of the American Mathematical Society.

Among his awards and honors:

- Sloan Research Fellowship (1991-1993)
- Alan T. Waterman Award (1994)
- Oswald Veblen Prize in Geometry (1996)
- Elected to the Chinese Academy of Sciences (2001)
- Elected to the American Academy of Arts and Sciences (2004)

Since at least 2013 he has been heavily involved in Chinese politics, serving as the Vice Chairman of the China Democratic League, the second most populous political party in China.

== Mathematical contributions ==
=== The Kähler-Einstein problem ===
Tian is well-known for his contributions to Kähler geometry, and in particular to the study of Kähler-Einstein metrics. Shing-Tung Yau, in his renowned resolution of the Calabi conjecture, had settled the case of closed Kähler manifolds with nonpositive first Chern class. His work in applying the method of continuity showed that C^{0} control of the Kähler potentials would suffice to prove existence of Kähler-Einstein metrics on closed Kähler manifolds with positive first Chern class, also known as "Fano manifolds." Tian and Yau extended Yau's analysis of the Calabi conjecture to non-compact settings, where they obtained partial results.^{[TY90]} They also extended their work to allow orbifold singularities.^{[TY91]}

Tian introduced the "α-invariant," which is essentially the optimal constant in the Moser-Trudinger inequality when applied to Kähler potentials with a supremal value of 0. He showed that if the α-invariant is sufficiently large (i.e. if a sufficiently strong Moser-Trudinger inequality holds), then C^{0} control in Yau's method of continuity could be achieved.^{[T87b]} This was applied to demonstrate new examples of Kähler-Einstein surfaces. The case of Kähler surfaces was revisited by Tian in 1990, claiming a complete resolution of the Kähler-Einstein problem in that context.^{[T90b]} The main technique was to study the possible geometric degenerations of a sequence of Kähler-Einstein metrics, as detectable by the Gromov–Hausdorff convergence. Tian adapted many of the technical innovations of Karen Uhlenbeck, as developed for Yang-Mills connections, to the setting of Kähler metrics. Some similar and influential work in the Riemannian setting was done in 1989 and 1990 by Michael Anderson, Shigetoshi Bando, Atsushi Kasue, and Hiraku Nakajima. However, it was later discovered that Tian's paper contains serious gaps. In particular, in the degree 1 case, which is the most delicate, in Odaka-Spotti-Sun (see Example 5.8) explained that Proposition 6.2 in Tian's paper is false by exhibiting an explicit counterexample. The proposition asserted that, for a degree 1 Gromov-Hausdorff limit, the linear system |-2K| is free of base points and the surface possesses at most one non-canonical singularity of specific type. It was shown in that there is an explicit toric Kähler-Einstein limit of Gorenstein index is 3, which shows these assertions fail. It therefore remains unclear whether Tian's strategy can be used to handle the degree 1 case.

Tian's most renowned contribution to the Kähler-Einstein problem came in 1997. Yau had conjectured in the 1980s, based partly in analogy to the Donaldson-Uhlenbeck-Yau theorem, that existence of a Kähler-Einstein metric should correspond to stability of the underlying Kähler manifold in a certain sense of geometric invariant theory. It was generally understood, especially following work of Akito Futaki, that the existence of holomorphic vector fields should act as an obstruction to the existence of Kähler-Einstein metrics. Tian and Wei Yue Ding established that this obstruction is not sufficient within the class of Kähler orbifolds.^{[DT92]} Tian, in his 1997 article, gave concrete examples of Kähler manifolds (rather than orbifolds) which had no holomorphic vector fields and also no Kähler-Einstein metrics, showing that the desired criterion lies deeper.^{[T97]} Yau had proposed that, rather than holomorphic vector fields on the manifold itself, it should be relevant to study the deformations of projective embeddings of Kähler manifolds under holomorphic vector fields on projective space. This idea was modified by Tian, introducing the notion of K-stability and showing that any Kähler-Einstein manifold must be K-stable.^{[T97]}

Simon Donaldson, in 2002, modified and extended Tian's definition of K-stability. The conjecture that K-stability would be sufficient to ensure the existence of a Kähler-Einstein metric became known as the Yau-Tian-Donaldson conjecture. In 2015, Xiuxiong Chen, Donaldson, and Song Sun, published a proof of the conjecture, receiving the Oswald Veblen Prize in Geometry for their work. Tian published a proof of the conjecture in the same year, although Chen, Donaldson, and Sun have accused Tian of academic and mathematical misconduct over his paper.^{[T15]} In Section 6 of ^{[T15]}, Tian outlined two approaches to finish the proof of Theorem 1.1 (the main theorem), the second approach is similar to the one used in, and the first approach follows Tian's old work ^{[T97]} , involving CM-stability. The first approach is now known to contain a gap. Specifically, Theorem 6.6 asserted that K-stability implies CM-stability. The proof relies on the generalised numerical criterion for pairs claimed in the preprint works of S. Paul. However, it was subsequently observed that Paul's proof of the generalized numerical criterion contains a gap (see Section 5.3 of ). Several subsequent works attempted to repair this gap. More recently, however, Paul, Sun, Zhang constructed explicit counterexamples to the generalized numerical criterion (see Theorem 1.3 and Remark 1.4 in), showing that the criterions, as originally stated, is false. Consequently, the arguments establishing Theorem 6.6 in ^{[T15]} is no longer valid.

=== Kähler geometry ===
In one of his first articles, Tian studied the space of Calabi-Yau metrics on a Kähler manifold.^{[T87a]} He showed that any infinitesimal deformation of Calabi-Yau structure can be 'integrated' to a one-parameter family of Calabi-Yau metrics; this proves that the "moduli space" of Calabi-Yau metrics on the given manifold has the structure of a smooth manifold. This was also studied earlier by Andrey Todorov, and the result is known as the Tian−Todorov theorem. As an application, Tian found a formula for the Weil-Petersson metric on the moduli space of Calabi-Yau metrics in terms of the period mapping.^{[T87a]}

Motivated by the Kähler-Einstein problem and a conjecture of Yau relating to Bergman metrics, Tian studied the following problem. Let L be a line bundle over a Kähler manifold M, and fix a hermitian bundle metric whose curvature form is a Kähler form on M. Suppose that for sufficiently large m, an orthonormal set of holomorphic sections of the line bundle L^{⊗m} defines a projective embedding of M. One can pull back the Fubini-Study metric to define a sequence of metrics on M as m increases. Tian showed that a certain rescaling of this sequence will necessarily converge in the C^{2} topology to the original Kähler metric.^{[T90a]} The refined asymptotics of this sequence were taken up in a number of influential subsequent papers by other authors, and are particularly important in Simon Donaldson's program on extremal metrics. The approximability of a Kähler metric by Kähler metrics induced from projective embeddings is also relevant to Yau's picture of the Yau-Tian-Donaldson conjecture, as indicated above.

In a highly technical article, Xiuxiong Chen and Tian studied the regularity theory of certain complex Monge-Ampère equations, with applications to the study of the geometry of extremal Kähler metrics.^{[CT08]} Although their paper has been very widely cited, Julius Ross and David Witt Nyström found counterexamples to the regularity results of Chen and Tian in 2015.

=== Gromov-Witten theory ===
Pseudoholomorphic curves were shown by Mikhail Gromov in 1985 to be powerful tools in symplectic geometry. In 1991, Edward Witten conjectured a use of Gromov's theory to define enumerative invariants. Tian and Yongbin Ruan found the details of such a construction, proving that the various intersections of the images of pseudo-holomorphic curves is independent of many choices, and in particular gives an associative multilinear mapping on the homology of certain symplectic manifolds.^{[RT95]} This structure is known as quantum cohomology; a contemporaneous and similarly influential approach is due to Dusa McDuff and Dietmar Salamon. Ruan and Tian's results are in a somewhat more general setting.

With Jun Li, Tian gave a purely algebraic adaptation of these results to the setting of algebraic varieties.^{[LT98b]} This was done at the same time as Kai Behrend and Barbara Fantechi, using a different approach.

Li and Tian then adapted their algebro-geometric work back to the analytic setting in symplectic manifolds, extending the earlier work of Ruan and Tian.^{[LT98a]} Tian and Gang Liu made use of this work to prove the well-known Arnold conjecture on the number of fixed points of Hamiltonian diffeomorphisms.^{[LT98c]} However, these papers of Li-Tian and Liu-Tian on symplectic Gromov-Witten theory have been criticized by Dusa McDuff and Katrin Wehrheim as being incomplete or incorrect, saying that Li and Tian's article ^{[LT98a]} "lacks almost all detail" on certain points and that Liu and Tian's article ^{[LT98c]} has "serious analytic errors."

=== Geometric analysis ===
In 1995, Tian and Weiyue Ding studied the harmonic map heat flow of a two-dimensional closed Riemannian manifold into a closed Riemannian manifold N.^{[DT95]} In a seminal 1985 work, following the 1982 breakthrough of Jonathan Sacks and Karen Uhlenbeck, Michael Struwe had studied this problem and showed that there is a weak solution which exists for all positive time. Furthermore, Struwe showed that the solution u is smooth away from finitely many spacetime points; given any sequence of spacetime points at which the solution is smooth and which converge to a given singular point (p, T), one can perform some rescalings to (subsequentially) define a finite number of harmonic maps from the round 2-dimensional sphere into N, called "bubbles." Ding and Tian proved a certain "energy quantization," meaning that the defect between the Dirichlet energy of u(T) and the limit of the Dirichlet energy of u(t) as t approaches T is exactly measured by the sum of the Dirichlet energies of the bubbles. Such results are significant in geometric analysis, following the original energy quantization result of Yum-Tong Siu and Shing-Tung Yau in their proof of the Frankel conjecture. The analogous problem for harmonic maps, as opposed to Ding and Tian's consideration of the harmonic map flow, was considered by Changyou Wang around the same time.

A major paper of Tian's dealt with the Yang–Mills equations.^{[T00a]} In addition to extending much of Karen Uhlenbeck's analysis to higher dimensions, he studied the interaction of Yang-Mills theory with calibrated geometry. Uhlenbeck had shown in the 1980s that, when given a sequence of Yang-Mills connections of uniformly bounded energy, they will converge smoothly on the complement of a subset of codimension at least four, known as the complement of the "singular set". Using techniques developed by Fanghua Lin in the study of harmonic maps, Tian showed that the singular set is a rectifiable set. In the case that the manifold is equipped with a calibration, one can restrict interest to the Yang-Mills connections which are self-dual relative to the calibration. In this case, Tian claimed that the singular set is calibrated. For instance, the singular set of a sequence of hermitian Yang-Mills connections of uniformly bounded energy will be a holomorphic cycle. This was viewed as a significant geometric feature of the analysis of Yang-Mills connections. However, it was later discovered that there are significant gaps in Tian’s article ^{[T00a]}. In a later paper in 2004, Terence Tao and Tian addressed these issues, providing a new proof to fill the gap in the epsilon-regularity theorem originally claimed in ^{[T00a]} (which had implicitly assumed the existence of a good gauge). Furthermore, the proof of the calibrated property of the singular set presented in ^{[T00a]} also contains serious flaws. Specifically, the proof of Proposition 2.3.1 in ^{[T00a]} is incorrect, as it fails to utilise the self-duality assumption, despite the fact that the statement is known to be false without this assumption. The core issue lies in the fact that it is not ruled out the possibility that the limit connection may encounter topological singularities. There is also an issue concerning the compactness of the space of generalised instantons claimed in ^{[T00a]}, as noted in the paper (see Remark 1.15).

=== Ricci flow ===
In 2006, Tian and Zhou Zhang studied the Ricci flow in the special setting of closed Kähler manifolds.^{[TZ06]} Their principal achievement was to show that the maximal time of existence can be characterized in purely cohomological terms. This represents one sense in which the Kähler-Ricci flow is significantly simpler than the usual Ricci flow, where there is no (known) computation of the maximal time of existence from a given geometric context. Tian and Zhang's proof consists of a use of the scalar maximum principle as applied to various geometric evolution equations, in terms of a Kähler potential as parametrized by a linear deformation of forms which is cohomologous to the Kähler-Ricci flow itself. In a notable work with Jian Song, Tian analyzed the Kähler Ricci flow on certain two-dimensional complex manifolds.^{[ST07]}

In 2002 and 2003, Grigori Perelman posted three papers on the arXiv which purported to prove the Poincaré conjecture and Geometrization conjecture in the field of three-dimensional geometric topology. Perelman's papers were immediately acclaimed for many of their novel ideas and results, although the technical details of many of his arguments were seen as hard to verify. In collaboration with John Morgan, Tian published an exposition of Perelman's papers in 2007, filling in many of the details.^{[MT07]} Other expositions, which have also been widely studied, were written by Huai-Dong Cao and Xi-Ping Zhu, and by Bruce Kleiner and John Lott. Morgan and Tian's exposition is the only of the three to deal with Perelman's third paper, which is irrelevant for analysis of the geometrization conjecture but uses curve-shortening flow to provide a simpler argument for the special case of the Poincaré conjecture. Eight years after the publication of Morgan and Tian's book, Abbas Bahri pointed to part of their exposition of this paper to be in error, having relied upon incorrect computations of evolution equations. The error, which dealt with details not present in Perelman's paper, was soon after amended by Morgan and Tian.

In collaboration with Nataša Šešum, Tian also published an exposition of Perelman's work on the Ricci flow of Kähler manifolds, which Perelman did not publish in any form.

== Selected publications ==
Research articles.

T87a.	Tian, Gang (1987). "Smoothness of the universal deformation space of compact Calabi–Yau manifolds and its Petersson–Weil metric". In Yau, S.-T. (ed.). Mathematical aspects of string theory. Conference held at the University of California, San Diego (July 21–August 1, 1986). Advanced Series in Mathematical Physics. Vol. 1. Singapore: World Scientific Publishing Co. pp. 629–646. doi:10.1142/9789812798411_0029. ISBN 9971-50-273-9. MR 0915841.

T87b.	Tian, Gang (1987). "On Kähler–Einstein metrics on certain Kähler manifolds with c_{1}(M) > 0". Inventiones Mathematicae. 89 (2): 225–246. doi:10.1007/BF01389077. MR 0894378. S2CID 122352133.

TY87.	Tian, Gang; Yau, Shing-Tung (1987). "Kähler–Einstein metrics on complex surfaces with C_{1} > 0". Communications in Mathematical Physics. 112 (1): 175–203. doi:10.1007/BF01217685. MR 0904143. S2CID 121216755.

T90a.	Tian, Gang (1990). "On a set of polarized Kähler metrics on algebraic manifolds". Journal of Differential Geometry. 32 (1): 99–130. Bibcode:1990JDGeo..3245039T. doi:10.4310/jdg/1214445039. MR 1064867.

T90b.	Tian, G. (1990). "On Calabi's conjecture for complex surfaces with positive first Chern class". Inventiones Mathematicae. 101 (1): 101–172. Bibcode:1990InMat.101..101T. doi:10.1007/BF01231499. MR 1055713. S2CID 59419559.

TY90.	Tian, G.; Yau, Shing-Tung (1990). "Complete Kähler manifolds with zero Ricci curvature. I". Journal of the American Mathematical Society. 3 (3): 579–609. doi:10.1090/S0894-0347-1990-1040196-6. MR 1040196.

TY91.	Tian, Gang; Yau, Shing-Tung (1991). "Complete Kähler manifolds with zero Ricci curvature. II". Inventiones Mathematicae. 106 (1): 27–60. Bibcode:1991InMat.106...27T. doi:10.1007/BF01243902. MR 1123371. S2CID 122638262.

DT92.	Ding, Wei Yue; Tian, Gang (1992). "Kähler–Einstein metrics and the generalized Futaki invariant". Inventiones Mathematicae. 110: 315–335. Bibcode:1992InMat.110..315D. doi:10.1007/BF01231335. MR 1185586. S2CID 59332400.

DT95.	Ding, Weiyue; Tian, Gang (1995). "Energy identity for a class of approximate harmonic maps from surfaces". Communications in Analysis and Geometry. 3 (3–4): 543–554. doi:10.4310/CAG.1995.v3.n4.a1. MR 1371209.

RT95.	Ruan, Yongbin; Tian, Gang (1995). "A mathematical theory of quantum cohomology". Journal of Differential Geometry. 42 (2): 259–367. Bibcode:1995JDGeo..4257234R. doi:10.4310/jdg/1214457234. MR 1366548.

ST97.	Siebert, Bernd; Tian, Gang (1997). "On quantum cohomology rings of Fano manifolds and a formula of Vafa and Intriligator". Asian Journal of Mathematics. 1 (4): 679–695. arXiv:alg-geom/9403010. doi:10.4310/AJM.1997.v1.n4.a2. MR 1621570. S2CID 14494725.

T97.	Tian, Gang (1997). "Kähler–Einstein metrics with positive scalar curvature". Inventiones Mathematicae. 130 (1): 1–37. Bibcode:1997InMat.130....1T. doi:10.1007/s002220050176. MR 1471884. S2CID 122529381.

LT98a.	Li, Jun; Tian, Gang (1998). "Virtual moduli cycles and Gromov–Witten invariants of general symplectic manifolds". In Stern, Ronald J. (ed.). Topics in symplectic 4-manifolds. 1st International Press Lectures presented at the University of California, Irvine (March 28–30, 1996). First International Press Lecture Series. Vol. I. Cambridge, MA: International Press. pp. 47–83. arXiv:alg-geom/9608032. ISBN 1-57146-019-5. MR 1635695.

LT98b.	Li, Jun; Tian, Gang (1998). "Virtual moduli cycles and Gromov–Witten invariants of algebraic varieties". Journal of the American Mathematical Society. 11 (1): 119–174. arXiv:alg-geom/9602007. doi:10.1090/S0894-0347-98-00250-1. MR 1467172. S2CID 15201721.

LT98c.	Liu, Gang; Tian, Gang (1998). "Floer homology and Arnold conjecture". Journal of Differential Geometry. 49 (1): 1–74. Bibcode:1998JDGeo..4960936L. doi:10.4310/jdg/1214460936. MR 1642105.

T00a.	Tian, Gang (2000). "Gauge theory and calibrated geometry. I". Annals of Mathematics. Second Series. 151 (1): 193–268. arXiv:math/0010015. doi:10.2307/121116. JSTOR 121116. MR 1745014.

TZ06.	Tian, Gang; Zhang, Zhou (2006). "On the Kähler–Ricci flow on projective manifolds of general type". Chinese Annals of Mathematics, Series B. 27 (2): 179–192. CiteSeerX 10.1.1.116.5906. doi:10.1007/s11401-005-0533-x. MR 2243679. S2CID 16476473.

ST07.	Song, Jian; Tian, Gang (2007). "The Kähler–Ricci flow on surfaces of positive Kodaira dimension". Inventiones Mathematicae. 17 (3): 609–653. arXiv:math/0602150. Bibcode:2007InMat.170..609S. doi:10.1007/s00222-007-0076-8. MR 2357504. S2CID 735225.

CT08.	Chen, X. X.; Tian, G. (2008). "Geometry of Kähler metrics and foliations by holomorphic discs". Publications Mathématiques de l'Institut des Hautes Études Scientifiques. 107: 1–107. arXiv:math/0507148. doi:10.1007/s10240-008-0013-4. MR 2434691. S2CID 119699845.

T15.	Tian, Gang (2015). "K-stability and Kähler–Einstein metrics". Communications on Pure and Applied Mathematics. 68 (7): 1085–1156. arXiv:1211.4669. doi:10.1002/cpa.21578. MR 3352459. S2CID 119303358. (Erratum: doi:10.1002/cpa.21612)

Books.

T00b.	Tian, Gang (2000). Canonical metrics in Kähler geometry. Lectures in Mathematics ETH Zürich. Notes taken by Meike Akveld. Basel: Birkhäuser Verlag. doi:10.1007/978-3-0348-8389-4. ISBN 3-7643-6194-8. MR 1787650.

MT07.	Morgan, John; Tian, Gang (2007). Ricci flow and the Poincaré conjecture. Clay Mathematics Monographs. Vol. 3. Cambridge, MA: Clay Mathematics Institute. arXiv:math/0607607. ISBN 978-0-8218-4328-4. MR 2334563. Morgan, John; Tian, Gang (2015). "Correction to Section 19.2 of Ricci Flow and the Poincare Conjecture". arXiv:1512.00699 [math.DG].

MT14.	Morgan, John; Tian, Gang (2014). The geometrization conjecture. Clay Mathematics Monographs. Vol. 5. Cambridge, MA: Clay Mathematics Institute. ISBN 978-0-8218-5201-9. MR 3186136.
