= Barannik =

Barannik (Russian: Баранник; Ukrainian: Бараннік) is a surname. Notable people with the surname include:

- Dmitri Barannik, Russian footballer and coach
- Oleh Barannik (born 1992), Ukrainian footballer

== See also ==
- Barannikov, a surname
