= Clay Mathematics Monographs =

Mathematics research paper series

Clay Mathematics Monographs is a series of expositions in mathematics co-published by AMS and Clay Mathematics Institute. Each volume in the series offers an exposition of an active area of current research, provided by a group of mathematicians.

== List of books ==
- Morgan, John; Tian, Gang (2014). The Geometrization Conjecture. CIMM 5. ISBN 978-0-8218-5201-9.
- Aspinwall, Paul S.; Bridgeland, Tom; Craw, Alastair; Douglas, Michael R.; Gross, Mark; Kapustin, Anton; Moore, Gregory W.; Segal, Graeme; Szendrői, Balázs; Wilson, P.M.H. (2009). Dirichlet Branes and Mirror Symmetry. CIMM 4. ISBN 978-0-8218-3848-8.
- Morgan, John; Tian, Gang (2007). Ricci Flow and the Poincaré Conjecture. CIMM 3. ISBN 978-0-8218-4328-4.
- Mazza, Carlo; Voevodsky, Vladimir; Weibel, Charles (2006). Lecture Notes on Motivic cohomology. CIMM 2. ISBN 978-0-8218-3847-1.
- Hori, Kentaro; Katz, Sheldon; Klemm, Albrecht; Pandharipande, Rahul; Thomas, Richard; Vafa, Cumrun; Vakil, Ravi; Zaslow, Eric (2003). Mirror Symmetry. CIMM 1. ISBN 978-0-8218-2955-4.
