= SYZ conjecture =

Mathematical conjecture

The Strominger–Yau–Zaslow (SYZ) conjecture is an attempt to understand the mirror symmetry conjecture, an issue in theoretical physics and mathematics. The original conjecture was proposed by Andrew Strominger, Shing-Tung Yau, and Eric Zaslow in 1996.

Along with the homological mirror symmetry conjecture, it is one of the most explored tools applied to understand mirror symmetry in mathematical terms. While the homological mirror symmetry is based on homological algebra, the SYZ conjecture is a geometrical realization of mirror symmetry.

== Formulation ==
In string theory, mirror symmetry relates type IIA and type IIB theories. It predicts that the effective field theory of type IIA and type IIB should be the same if the two theories are compactified on mirror pair manifolds.

The SYZ conjecture uses this fact to realize mirror symmetry. It starts from considering BPS states of type IIA theories compactified on X, especially 0-branes that have moduli space X. It is known that all of the BPS states of type IIB theories compactified on Y are 3-branes. Therefore, mirror symmetry will map 0-branes of type IIA theories into a subset of 3-branes of type IIB theories.

By considering supersymmetric conditions, it has been shown that these 3-branes should be special Lagrangian submanifolds. On the other hand, T-duality does the same transformation in this case, thus "mirror symmetry is T-duality".

== Mathematical statement ==
The initial proposal of the SYZ conjecture by Strominger, Yau, and Zaslow, was not given as a precise mathematical statement. One part of the mathematical resolution of the SYZ conjecture is to, in some sense, correctly formulate the statement of the conjecture itself. There is no agreed upon precise statement of the conjecture within the mathematical literature, but there is a general statement that is expected to be close to the correct formulation of the conjecture, which is presented here. This statement emphasizes the topological picture of mirror symmetry, but does not precisely characterise the relationship between the complex and symplectic structures of the mirror pairs, or make reference to the associated Riemannian metrics involved.

SYZ conjecture: Every 6-dimensional Calabi–Yau manifold $X$ has a mirror 6-dimensional Calabi–Yau manifold $\hat{X}$ such that there are continuous surjections $f: X\to B$, $\hat{f}:\hat{X} \to B$ to a compact topological manifold $B$ of dimension 3, such that
1. There exists a dense open subset $B_{\text{reg}}\subset B$ on which the maps $f,\hat{f}$ are fibrations by nonsingular special Lagrangian 3-tori. Furthermore for every point $b\in B_{\text{reg}}$, the torus fibres $f^{-1}(b)$ and $\hat{f}^{-1}(b)$ should be dual to each other in some sense, analogous to duality of Abelian varieties.
2. For each $b\in B\backslash B_{\text{reg}}$, the fibres $f^{-1}(b)$ and $\hat f^{-1}(b)$ should be singular 3-dimensional special Lagrangian submanifolds of $X$ and $\hat{X}$ respectively.

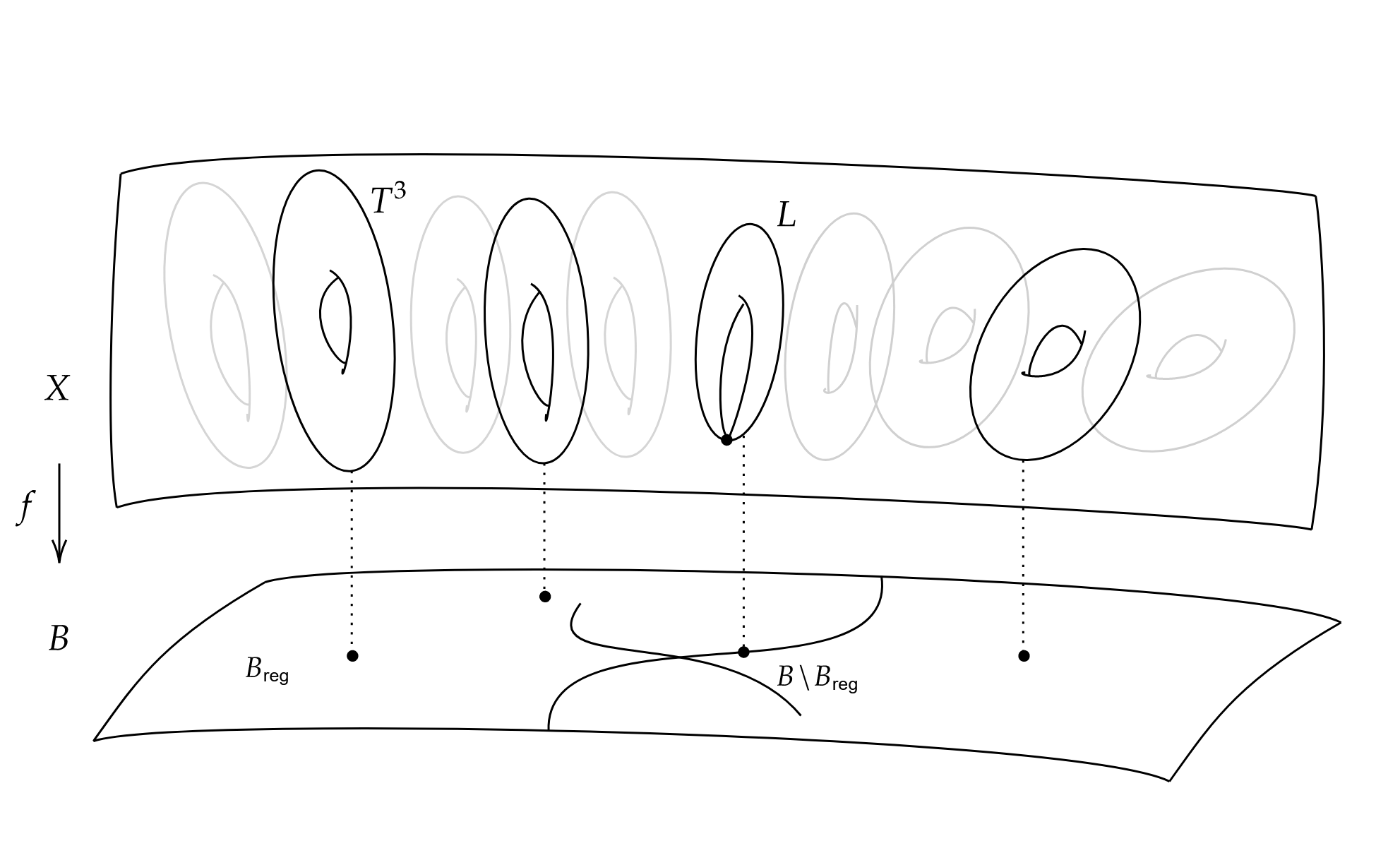
Diagram of a special Lagrangian torus fibration. The fibres of $f: X \to B$ over points in $B_{\text{reg}}$ are 3-tori, and over the singular set $B\backslash B_{\text{reg}}$ the fibre could be a possibly singular special Lagrangian submanifold $L$.

The situation in which $B_{\text{reg}} = B$ so that there is no singular locus is called the semi-flat limit of the SYZ conjecture, and is often used as a model situation to describe torus fibrations. The SYZ conjecture can be shown to hold in some simple cases of semi-flat limits, for example given by Abelian varieties and K3 surfaces which are fibred by elliptic curves.

It is expected that the correct formulation of the SYZ conjecture will differ somewhat from the statement above. For example the possible behaviour of the singular set $B\backslash B_{\text{reg}}$ is not well understood, and this set could be quite large in comparison to $B$. Mirror symmetry is also often phrased in terms of degenerating families of Calabi–Yau manifolds instead of for a single Calabi–Yau, and one might expect the SYZ conjecture to reformulated more precisely in this language.

== Relation to homological mirror symmetry conjecture ==
The SYZ mirror symmetry conjecture is one possible refinement of the original mirror symmetry conjecture relating Hodge numbers of mirror Calabi–Yau manifolds. The other is Kontsevich's homological mirror symmetry conjecture (HMS conjecture). These two conjectures encode the predictions of mirror symmetry in different ways: homological mirror symmetry in an algebraic way, and the SYZ conjecture in a geometric way.

There should be a relationship between these three interpretations of mirror symmetry, but it is not yet known whether they should be equivalent or one proposal is stronger than the other. Progress has been made toward showing under certain assumptions that homological mirror symmetry implies Hodge theoretic mirror symmetry.

Nevertheless, in simple settings there are clear ways of relating the SYZ and HMS conjectures. The key feature of HMS is that the conjecture relates objects (either submanifolds or sheaves) on mirror geometric spaces, so the required input to try to understand or prove the HMS conjecture includes a mirror pair of geometric spaces. The SYZ conjecture predicts how these mirror pairs should arise, and so whenever an SYZ mirror pair is found, it is a good candidate to try and prove the HMS conjecture on this pair.

To relate the SYZ and HMS conjectures, it is convenient to work in the semi-flat limit. The important geometric feature of a pair of Lagrangian torus fibrations $X,\hat X \to B$ which encodes mirror symmetry is the dual torus fibres of the fibration. Given a Lagrangian torus $T\subset X$, the dual torus is given by the Jacobian variety of $T$, denoted $\hat T = \mathrm{Jac}(T)$. This is again a torus of the same dimension, and the duality is encoded in the fact that $\mathrm{Jac}(\mathrm{Jac}(T)) = T$ so $T$ and $\hat T$ are indeed dual under this construction. The Jacobian variety $\hat T$ has the important interpretation as the moduli space of line bundles on $T$.

This duality and the interpretation of the dual torus as a moduli space of sheaves on the original torus is what allows one to interchange the data of submanifolds and subsheaves. There are two simple examples of this phenomenon:

- If $p\in X$ is a point which lies inside some fibre $p\in T\subset X$ of the special Lagrangian torus fibration, then since $T = \mathrm{Jac}(\hat T)$, the point $p$ corresponds to a line bundle supported on $\hat T \subset \hat X$. If one chooses a Lagrangian section $s: B \to X$ such that $s(B)=L$ is a Lagrangian submanifold of $X$, then precisely since $s$ chooses one point in each torus fibre of the SYZ fibration, this Lagrangian section is mirror dual to a choice of line bundle structure supported on each torus fibre of the mirror manifold $\hat X$, and consequently a line bundle on the total space of $\hat X$, the simplest example of a coherent sheaf appearing in the derived category of the mirror manifold. If the mirror torus fibrations are not in the semi-flat limit, then special care must be taken when crossing over singular set of the base $B$.
- Another example of a Lagrangian submanifold is the torus fibre itself, and one sees that if the entire torus is taken as the Lagrangian $T\subset X$, with the added data of a flat unitary line bundle over it, as is often necessary in homological mirror symmetry, then in the dual torus $\hat T \subset \hat X$ this corresponds to a single point which represents that line bundle over the torus. If one takes the skyscraper sheaf supported on that point in the dual torus, then we see torus fibres of the SYZ fibration get sent to skyscraper sheaves supported on points in the mirror torus fibre.

These two examples produce the most extreme kinds of coherent sheaf, locally free sheaves (of rank 1) and torsion sheaves supported on points. By more careful construction one can build up more complicated examples of coherent sheaves, analogous to building a coherent sheaf using the torsion filtration. As a simple example, a Lagrangian multisection (a union of k Lagrangian sections) should be mirror dual to a rank k vector bundle on the mirror manifold, but one must take care to account for instanton corrections by counting holomorphic discs which are bounded by the multisection, in the sense of Gromov-Witten theory. In this way enumerative geometry becomes important for understanding how mirror symmetry interchanges dual objects.

By combining the geometry of mirror fibrations in the SYZ conjecture with a detailed understanding of enumerative invariants and the structure of the singular set of the base $B$, it is possible to use the geometry of the fibration to build the isomorphism of categories from the Lagrangian submanifolds of $X$ to the coherent sheaves of $\hat X$, the map $\mathrm{Fuk}(X) \to \mathrm{D}^b \mathrm{Coh}(\hat X)$. By repeating this same discussion in reverse using the duality of the torus fibrations, one similarly can understand coherent sheaves on $X$ in terms of Lagrangian submanifolds of $\hat X$, and hope to get a complete understanding of how the HMS conjecture relates to the SYZ conjecture.
