= Homological mirror symmetry =

Mathematics concept

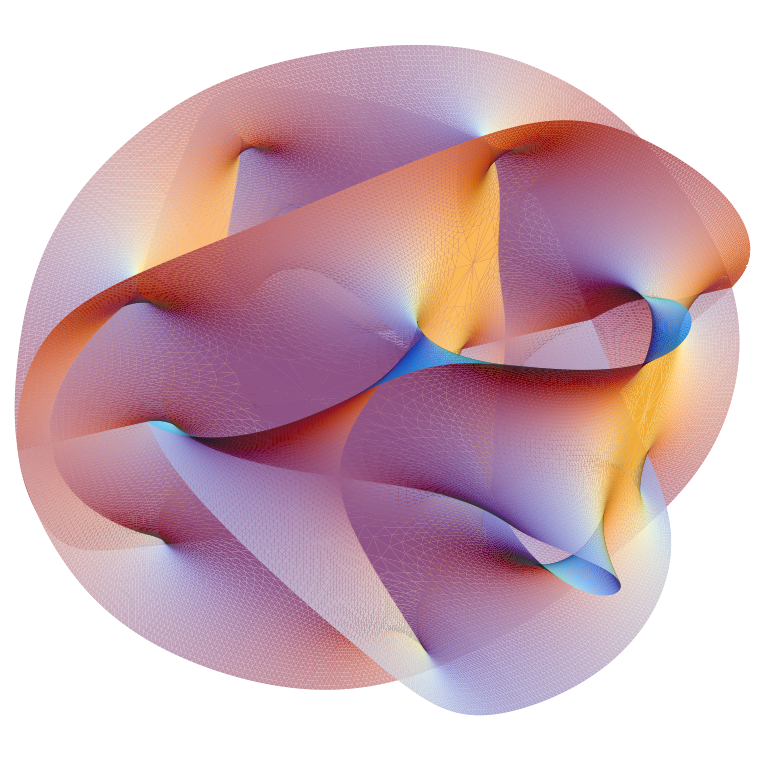
Visualization of a Calabi-Yau manifold, a central object in the theory of homological mirror symmetry

Homological mirror symmetry is a mathematical conjecture made by Maxim Kontsevich. It seeks a systematic mathematical explanation for a phenomenon called mirror symmetry first observed by physicists studying string theory.

== History ==
In an address to the 1994 International Congress of Mathematicians in Zürich, Kontsevich (1994) speculated that mirror symmetry for a pair of Calabi–Yau manifolds X and Y could be explained as an equivalence of a triangulated category constructed from the algebraic geometry of X (the derived category of coherent sheaves on X) and another triangulated category constructed from the symplectic geometry of Y (the derived Fukaya category).

Edward Witten originally described the topological twisting of the N=(2,2) supersymmetric field theory into what he called the A and B model topological string theories. These models concern maps from Riemann surfaces into a fixed target—usually a Calabi–Yau manifold. Most of the mathematical predictions of mirror symmetry are embedded in the physical equivalence of the A-model on Y with the B-model on its mirror X. When the Riemann surfaces have empty boundary, they represent the worldsheets of closed strings. To cover the case of open strings, one must introduce boundary conditions to preserve the supersymmetry. In the A-model, these boundary conditions come in the form of Lagrangian submanifolds of Y with some additional structure (often called a brane structure). In the B-model, the boundary conditions come in the form of holomorphic (or algebraic) submanifolds of X with holomorphic (or algebraic) vector bundles on them. These are the objects one uses to build the relevant categories. They are often called A and B branes respectively. Morphisms in the categories are given by the massless spectrum of open strings stretching between two branes.

The closed string A and B models only capture the so-called topological sector—a small portion of the full string theory. Similarly, the branes in these models are only topological approximations to the full dynamical objects that are D-branes. Even so, the mathematics resulting from this small piece of string theory has been both deep and difficult.

The School of Mathematics at the Institute for Advanced Study in Princeton devoted a whole year to Homological Mirror Symmetry during the 2016-17 academic year. Among the participants were Paul Seidel from MIT, Maxim Kontsevich from IHÉS, and Denis Auroux, from UC Berkeley.

== Examples ==
Only in a few examples have mathematicians been able to verify the conjecture. In his seminal address, Kontsevich commented that the conjecture could be proved in the case of elliptic curves using theta functions. Following this route, Alexander Polishchuk and Eric Zaslow provided a proof of a version of the conjecture for elliptic curves. Kenji Fukaya was able to establish elements of the conjecture for abelian varieties. Later, Kontsevich and Yan Soibelman provided a proof of the majority of the conjecture for nonsingular torus bundles over affine manifolds using ideas from the SYZ conjecture. In 2003, Paul Seidel proved the conjecture in the case of the quartic surface. In 2002 Hausel & Thaddeus (2002) explained SYZ conjecture in the context of Hitchin system and Langlands duality.

== Hodge diamond ==
The dimensions h^{p,q} of spaces of harmonic (p,q)-differential forms (equivalently, the cohomology, i.e., closed forms modulo exact forms) are conventionally arranged in a diamond shape called the Hodge diamond. These (p,q)-Betti numbers can be computed for complete intersections using a generating function described by Friedrich Hirzebruch. For a three-dimensional manifold, for example, the Hodge diamond has p and q ranging from 0 to 3:

			h^{3,3}
		h^{3,2}		h^{2,3}
	h^{3,1}		h^{2,2}		h^{1,3}
h^{3,0}		h^{2,1}		h^{1,2}		h^{0,3}
	h^{2,0}		h^{1,1}		h^{0,2}
		h^{1,0}		h^{0,1}
			h^{0,0}

Mirror symmetry translates the dimension number of the (p, q)-th differential form h^{p,q} for the original manifold into h^{n-p,q} of that for the counter pair manifold. Namely, for any Calabi–Yau manifold the Hodge diamond is unchanged by a rotation by π radians and the Hodge diamonds of mirror Calabi–Yau manifolds are related by a rotation by π/2 radians.

In the case of an elliptic curve, which is viewed as a 1-dimensional Calabi–Yau manifold, the Hodge diamond is especially simple: it is the following figure.

	1
1		1
	1

In the case of a K3 surface, which is viewed as 2-dimensional Calabi–Yau manifold, since the Betti numbers are {1, 0, 22, 0, 1}, their Hodge diamond is the following figure.

		1
	0		0
1		20		1
	0		0
		1

In the 3-dimensional case, usually called the Calabi–Yau manifold, a very interesting thing happens. There are sometimes mirror pairs, say M and W, that have symmetric Hodge diamonds with respect to each other along a diagonal line.

M's diamond:

			1
		0		0
	0		a		0
1		b		b		1
	0		a		0
		0		0
			1

W's diamond:

			1
		0		0
	0		b		0
1		a		a		1
	0		b		0
		0		0
			1

M and W correspond to A- and B-model in string theory. Mirror symmetry not only replaces the homological dimensions but also the symplectic structure and complex structure on the mirror pairs. That is the origin of homological mirror symmetry.

In 1990-1991, Candelas et al. 1991 had a major impact not only on enumerative algebraic geometry but on the whole mathematics and motivated Kontsevich (1994). The mirror pair of two quintic threefolds in this paper have the following Hodge diamonds.

			1
		0		0
	0		1		0
1		101		101		1
	0		1		0
		0		0
			1

			1
		0		0
	0		101		0
1		1		1		1
	0		101		0
		0		0
			1

== See also ==
- Mirror symmetry conjecture - more mathematically based article
- Topological quantum field theory
- Category theory
- Floer homology
- Fukaya category
- Derived category
- Quintic threefold
