= Paul S. Aspinwall =

British physicist and mathematician

Paul Stephen Aspinwall (born 26 January 1964 in England) is a British theoretical physicist and mathematician, who works on string theory (including dualities, mirror symmetry, D-branes, and Calabi–Yau manifolds) and also algebraic geometry.

Aspinwall received his early education at Bydales School, Marske-by-the-Sea and Prior Pursglove College, Guisborough. He then studied at the University of Oxford with a focus on theoretical elementary particle physics. He received his bachelor's degree in 1985 and his Ph.D. in 1988. He is now a professor of mathematics and physics at Duke University in Durham, North Carolina.

In 1998 he was an Invited Speaker with talk (String theory and duality) at the ICM in Berlin. In 1999 he was a Sloan Fellow.

== Selected publications ==
- as editor: Dirichlet branes and mirror symmetry, Clay School on Geometry and String Theory, Cambridge 2002, Clay Mathematics Monographs, American Mathematical Society 2009
- Aspinwall, Paul S.; Greene, Brian R.; Morrison, David R. (1994). "Calabi–Yau moduli space, mirror manifolds and spacetime topology change in string theory". Nuclear Physics B. 416 (2). Elsevier BV: 414–480. arXiv:hep-th/9309097. Bibcode:1994NuPhB.416..414A. doi:10.1016/0550-3213(94)90321-2. ISSN 0550-3213.
- Aspinwall, P. S.; Greene, B. R.; Morrison, D. R. (1995). "Spacetime Topology Change: The Physics of Calabi-Yau Moduli Space". In M. B. Halpern; G. Rivlis; A. Sevrin (eds.). Strings '93. Singapore: World Scientific. pp. 241–262. arXiv:hep-th/9311186.
- Aspinwall, Paul S. (2005). "D-branes on Calabi–Yau-manifolds". In Juan M. Maldacena (ed.). Progress in String Theory. World Scientific. pp. 1–152. arXiv:hep-th/0403166. doi:10.1142/9789812775108_0001. ISBN 978-981-256-406-1.
- Aspinwall, Paul S. (2000). "Compactification, Geometry and Duality: N=2". arXiv:hep-th/0001001.
- Aspinwall, Paul S. (1996). "K3 Surfaces and String Duality". arXiv:hep-th/9611137.
- Aspinwall, Paul S (1996). "Enhanced gauge symmetries and Calabi–Yau threefolds". Physics Letters B. 371 (3–4). Elsevier BV: 231–237. arXiv:hep-th/9511171. Bibcode:1996PhLB..371..231A. doi:10.1016/0370-2693(96)00003-2. ISSN 0370-2693.
- Aspinwall, Paul S. (1995). "Enhanced gauge symmetries and K3 surfaces". Physics Letters B. 357 (3). Elsevier BV: 329–334. arXiv:hep-th/9507012. Bibcode:1995PhLB..357..329A. doi:10.1016/0370-2693(95)00957-m. ISSN 0370-2693.
- Aspinwall, Paul S. (1996). "Some relationships between dualities in string theory". Nuclear Physics B - Proceedings Supplements. 46 (1–3). Elsevier BV: 30–38. arXiv:hep-th/9508154. Bibcode:1996NuPhS..46...30A. doi:10.1016/0920-5632(96)00004-7. ISSN 0920-5632.
- Aspinwall, Paul S.; Morrison, David R. (1993). "Topological field theory and rational curves". Communications in Mathematical Physics. 151 (2). Springer Science and Business Media LLC: 245–262. arXiv:hep-th/9110048. Bibcode:1993CMaPh.151..245A. doi:10.1007/bf02096768. ISSN 0010-3616.
- Aspinwall, Paul S; Louis, Jan (1996). "On the ubiquity of K3 fibrations in string duality". Physics Letters B. 369 (3–4). Elsevier BV: 233–242. arXiv:hep-th/9510234. Bibcode:1996PhLB..369..233A. doi:10.1016/0370-2693(95)01541-8. ISSN 0370-2693.
- Aspinwall, Paul S.; Morrison, David R. (1997). "Point-like instantons on K3 orbifolds". Nuclear Physics B. 503 (3). Elsevier BV: 533–564. arXiv:hep-th/9705104. Bibcode:1997NuPhB.503..533A. doi:10.1016/s0550-3213(97)00516-6. ISSN 0550-3213.
- Aspinwall, Paul S.; Greene, Brian R.; Morrison, David R. (1993). "Multiple mirror manifolds and topology change in string theory". Physics Letters B. 303 (3–4). Elsevier BV: 249–259. arXiv:hep-th/9301043. Bibcode:1993PhLB..303..249A. doi:10.1016/0370-2693(93)91428-p. ISSN 0370-2693.
- Aspinwall, Paul S.; Gross, Mark (1996). "The SO(32) heterotic string on a K3 surface". Physics Letters B. 387 (4). Elsevier BV: 735–742. arXiv:hep-th/9605131. Bibcode:1996PhLB..387..735A. doi:10.1016/0370-2693(96)01095-7. ISSN 0370-2693.
- Aspinwall, Paul S. (1997). "M-theory versus F-theory pictures of the heterotic string". Advances in Theoretical and Mathematical Physics. 1 (1). International Press of Boston: 127–147. arXiv:hep-th/9707014. doi:10.4310/atmp.1997.v1.n1.a4. ISSN 1095-0761.
- Aspinwall, P.S.; Lütken, C.A. (1991). "Quantum algebraic geometry of superstring compactifications". Nuclear Physics B. 355 (2). Elsevier BV: 482–510. Bibcode:1991NuPhB.355..482A. doi:10.1016/0550-3213(91)90123-f. ISSN 0550-3213.
- Aspinwall, Paul (1994). "The Moduli Space of N = 2 Superconformal Field Theories". arXiv:hep-th/9412115.
