= Ron Donagi =

American mathematician

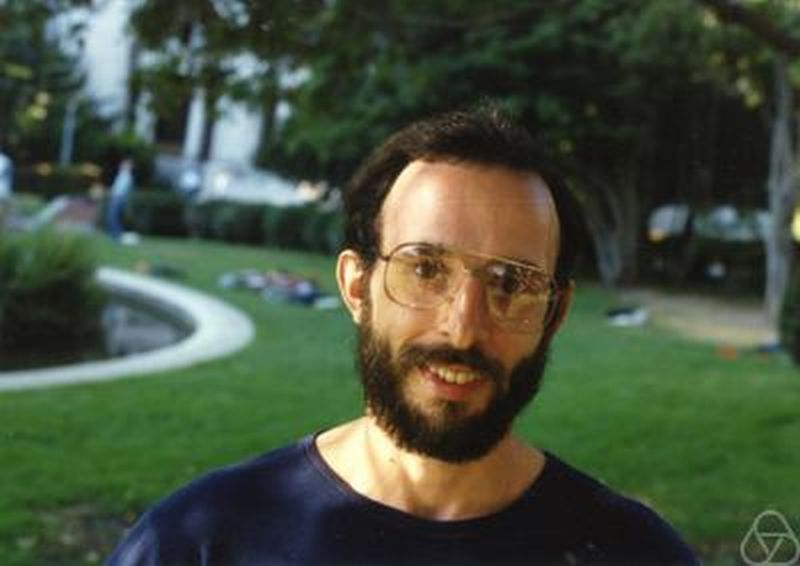
Ron Donagi, Berkeley 1990

Ron Yehuda Donagi (born March 9, 1956) is an American mathematician, working in algebraic geometry and string theory.

== Career ==
Donagi received a Ph.D. in 1977 under the supervision of Phillip Griffiths from Harvard University (On the geometry of Grassmannians). Currently, he is a professor at the University of Pennsylvania.

From 1981 to 1982, from 1996 to 1997 and in 2013 he was at the Institute for Advanced Study, where he worked with Edward Witten. In the 1980s Donagi applied algebraic geometry to string theory and related theories such as supersymmetric Yang-Mills theories in order to develop models for heterotic string theory from suitable compactifications. Among his achievements in classical algebraic geometry are his work on the Schottky problem and generalizing the Torelli theorem.

He is a fellow of the American Mathematical Society.

== Writings ==
- With Tony Pantev: Torus fibrations, gerbes, and duality, Mem. Amer. Math. Soc. 193 (2008), no. 901.
- Editor with Mauro Francaviglia: Integrable systems and quantum groups (CIME Lectures, Montecatini Terme, June 1993), Springer Verlag 1996.
- Publisher: Curves, Jacobians, and Abelian varieties, Proceedings of an AMS-IMS-SIAM Joint Summer Research Conference on the Schottky problem, AMS 1992.
- With Katrin Wendland (Eds.): From Hodge theory to integrability and TQFT: tt *-geometry (Workshop University of Augsburg 2007), AMS 2008.
- With Edward Witten: Supersymmetric Yang-Mills Systems and Integrable Systems, Nucl. Phys. B, 460, 1996, 299-344.
- With Josh Guffin, Sheldon Katz, Eric Sharpe, A mathematical theory of quantum sheaf cohomology, Asian J. Math. 18 (2014), no. 3, 387–417.
- With Guffin, Katz, Sharpe: Physical aspects of quantum sheaf cohomology for deformation of tangent bundles of toric varieties, Adv. Theor. Math. Phys. 17 (2013), no. 6, 1255–1301.
- With Vincent Bouchard, on SU(5) Heterotic standard model, Phys. Lett. B, 633, 2006, 783–791.
