= Charles M. Sommerfield =

Theoretical physicist

- Education: Brooklyn College (1957); Harvard (1961)
- Known for: Bogomol'nyi–Prasad–Sommerfield bound Bogomol'nyi–Prasad–Sommerfield state
- Scientific career
- Fields: Theoretical physics Particle physics
- Workplaces: Yale; Institute for Advanced Study
- Academic advisors: Julian Schwinger
- Notable students: Howard Georgi

Charles M. Sommerfield was a theoretical physicist and professor emeritus at Yale University. He is the namesake of the Bogomol'nyi–Prasad–Sommerfield bound.

== Biography ==
Sommerfield studied for his bachelor's at Brooklyn College and earned his Ph.D. from Julian Schwinger at Harvard University in 1957. He worked at Berkeley and Harvard for two years each before becoming professor at Yale in 1961. He was a fellow of Trumbull College. Additionally, he has held visiting positions at the Institute for Advanced Study and the University of Florida.

He is notable for his work on high-energy physics. He is one of the namesakes of the Bogomol'nyi–Prasad–Sommerfield bound and the Bogomol'nyi–Prasad–Sommerfield state, along with his graduate student M.K. Prasad. Another notable graduate student he supervised was Howard Georgi.

Sommerfield was elected a fellow of the American Physical Society in 1968.

== See also ==
- Bogomol'nyi–Prasad–Sommerfield state
