= Barannikov =

Barannikov (masculine, Russian: Баранников) or Barannikova (feminine, Russian: Баранникова) is a Russian surname. Notable people with the surname include:

- Aleksei Barannikov (skier) (born 1975), Russian skier
- Alekseĭ Petrovich Barannikov (1890–1952), Russian linguist
- Alexander Barannikov (1858–1883), Russian revolutionary
- Serguei Barannikov (born 1972), Russian mathematician
- Velikton Barannikov (1938–2007), Soviet boxer
- Viktor Barannikov (1940–1995), Russian politician
