= Lev Kontsevich =

Soviet Russian Koreanist (born 1930)

- Born: Lev Rafailovich Kontsevich; 3 September 1930 (age 95); Tambov, Russian SFSR, USSR
- Education: Moscow Institute of Oriental Studies
- Scientific career
- Fields: Korean studies, Oriental studies
- Workplaces: Institute of Oriental Studies of the Russian Academy of Sciences

Lev Rafailovich Kontsevich (Russian: Лев Рафаилович Концевич, Korean: 레프 라파일로비치 콘체비치, born 3 September 1930) is a Soviet-Russian orientalist and Candidate of Sciences, who created the Kontsevich system, the one of cyrillization system for the Korean language and currently the main system of transcribing and transliterating Korean words into the Cyrillic alphabet. He is also the father of mathematician Maxim Kontsevich.

== Biography ==
Kontsevich was born on 1930 in Tambov. He studied at the Moscow Institute of Oriental Studies and graduated from the Institute of Oriental Studies of the USSR Academy of Sciences, then worked there as a junior research fellow. From 1958 to 1974, he worked as head of the Department of Culture and Language and executive secretary of the scientific journal Peoples of Asia and Africa. During this time in 1965, he visited North Korea. In 1973, he defended his dissertation and received a PhD in Philology.

Following the dissolution of the Soviet Union in 1991, he served as a visiting professor in South Korea till 1995. From 1995 to 2003, he was a leading researcher at the International Center for Korean Studies at Moscow State University.

Currently, he is a leading researcher at the Department of Oriental Languages at the Institute of Oriental Studies of the Russian Academy of Sciences. Kontesevich is the author and editor of a large number of studies, articles and publications on oriental studies, as well as translations of Korean traditional literature. He is the author and editor of a large number of studies, articles and publications on oriental studies, as well as translations of Korean literature. He is best known for developing the Kontsevich system for transcribing Korean texts from Hangul to Cyrillic. The system is used by the Korean population living in post-Soviet states.

In 1999, he won the Korean Linguistics Achievement Award from the Dongsung Science Foundation in Seoul. In 2012, the South Korean Ministry of Culture, Sports and Tourism awarded Kontsevich the Order of Cultural Merit on Hangul Day, in recognition for his contributions to Korean studies. He is also the father of renowned mathematician Maxim Kontsevich.
