= Cyrillization of Korean =

The Cyrillization of Korean is the transcribing and transliterating the Korean language into the Cyrillic alphabet. The main cyrillization system in use is the Kontsevich system (Russian: Систе́ма Конце́вича, romanized: Sistema Kontsevicha, IPA: [sʲɪˈsʲtʲemə kɐnˈt͡sɛvʲɪt͡ɕə]). The Kontsevich system was created by the Soviet-Russian scholar Lev Kontsevich (Russian: Лев Конце́вич, IPA: [ˈlʲef kɐnˈtsɛvʲɪtɕ]) in the 1950s based on the earlier transliteration system designed by Aleksandr Kholodovich (Russian: Алекса́ндр Холодо́вич, IPA: [ɐlʲɪkˈsandr xəlɐˈdovʲɪtɕ]). As a consequence of the Cold War, a Latin-script variant of the Kontsevich system is used in the states of the former Warsaw Pact (for example, in Polish and Czech), while Serbian and Macedonian follow a Cyrillization system based on McCune–Reischauer romanization owing to the Socialist Federative Republic of Yugoslavia being a non-aligned state outside the Soviet bloc.

== Features ==
Cyrillization systems for Korean were developed domestically in both North Korea and South Korea; Kontsevich carried out work on the systemization of these rules. In contrast with some systems of Romanization of Korean, the transcription is based primarily on the pronunciation of a word, rather than on its spelling.

== Consonants ==
=== Initial ===
| Hangul | ㄱ | ㄴ | ㄷ | ㄹ | ㅁ | ㅂ | ㅅ | ㅈ | ㅊ | ㅋ | ㅌ | ㅍ | ㅎ | ㄲ | ㄸ | ㅃ | ㅆ | ㅉ | ㅇ |
| Cyrillic | к | н | т | р | м | п | с | ч | чх | кх | тх | пх | х | кк | тт | пп | сс | чч | – |
| McCune–Reischauer | k | n | t | r | m | p | s | ch | ch' | k' | t' | p' | h | kk | tt | pp | ss | tch | – |
| Revised Romanization | g | n | d | r | m | b | s | j | ch | k | t | p | h | kk | tt | pp | ss | jj | – |

=== Final ===
| Hangul | ㄱ | ㄴ | ㄷ | ㄹ | ㅁ | ㅂ | ㅅ | ㅈ | ㅊ | ㅋ | ㅌ | ㅍ | ㅎ | ㄲ | ㄸ | ㅃ | ㅆ | ㅉ | ㅇ |
| Cyrillic | к | н | т | ль | м | п | т | т | т | к | т | п | т | к | – | – | т | – | нъ |
| McCune–Reischauer | k | n | t | l | m | p | t | t | t | k | t | p | t | k | – | – | t | – | ng |
| Revised Romanization | k | n | t | l | m | p | t | t | t | k | t | p | t | k | – | – | t | – | ng |

=== Medial consonant rules ===
Some letters are transcribed differently in the middle of a word when following certain other letters.

| Next initial Previous ending | | ㄱ | ㄴ | ㄷ | ㄹ | ㅁ | ㅂ | ㅅ | ㅈ | ㅊ | ㅋ | ㅌ | ㅍ | ㅎ | ㅇ |
| Next initial Previous ending | | к | н | т | р | м | п | с | ч | чх | кх | тх | пх | х | – |
|---|---|---|---|---|---|---|---|---|---|---|---|---|---|---|---|
| ㄱ | к | кк | нн | кт | нн | нм | кп | кс | кч | кчх | ккх | ктх | кпх | кх | г |
| ㄴ | н | нг | нн | нд | лл | нм | нб | нс | ндж | нчх | нкх | нтх | нпх | нх | н |
| ㄹ | ль | льг | лл | льтт | лл | льм | льб | льсс | льчч | льчх | лькх | льтх | льпх | рх | р |
| ㅁ | м | мг | мн | мд | мн | мм | мб | мс | мдж | мчх | мкх | мтх | мпх | мх | м |
| ㅂ | п | пк | мн | пт | мн | мм | пп | пс | пч | пчх | пкх | птх | ппх | пх | б |
| ㅇ | нъ | нг | нн | нд | нн | нм | нб | нс | ндж | нчх | нкх | нтх | нпх | нх | нъ |

== Vowels ==
| Hangul | ㅏ | ㅑ | ㅓ | ㅕ | ㅗ | ㅛ | ㅜ | ㅠ | ㅡ | ㅣ | ㅐ | ㅒ | ㅔ | ㅖ | ㅚ | ㅟ | ㅢ | ㅘ | ㅝ | ㅙ | ㅞ |
| Cyrillic | а | я | о | ё | о | ё | у | ю | ы | и | э | йя | е | йе/ -е | ве | ви | ый/ -и | ва | во | вэ | ве |
| McCune–Reischauer | a | ya | ŏ | yŏ | o | yo | u | yu | ŭ | i | ae | yae | e/ -ë | ye | oe | wi | ŭi | wa | wŏ | wae | we |
| Revised Romanization | a | ya | eo | yeo | o | yo | u | yu | eu | i | ae | yae | e | ye | oe | wi | ui | wa | wo | wae | we |

== Examples ==
| English | Hangul (Hanja) | RR (RR transliteration in parentheses) | Kontsevich (Latin transliteration in parentheses) | Serbian-script McCune–Reischauer (Gaj's Latin alphabet in parentheses) |
|---|---|---|---|---|
| wall | 벽 (壁) | byeok (byeog) | пёк (pyok) | пјок (pjok) |
| on the wall | 벽에 | byeoge (byeog-e) | пёге (pyoge) | пјоге (pjoge) |
| outside (uninflected) | 밖 | bak (bakk) | пак (pak) | пак (pak) |
| outside | 밖에 | bakke (bakk-e) | пакке (pakke) | паге (page) |
| kitchen | 부엌 | bueok (bueok) | пуок (puok) | пуок (puok) |
| to the kitchen | 부엌에 | bueoke (bueok-e) | пуокхе (puokhe) | пуоке (puoke) |
| Wikipedia | 위키백과 | wikibaekgwa (wikibaeggwa) | викхибэкква (vikhibèkkva) | викибекква (vikibekkva) |
| Hangul | 한글 | hangeul or han-geul (han-geul) | хангыль (hangyl') | хан'гул (han'gul) |
| Hanja | 한자 (漢字) | hanja (han-ja) | ханчча (hanchcha) | ханђа (hanđa) |
| character, letter | 글자 (㐎字) | geulja (geul-ja) | кыльчча (kyl'chcha) | кулђа (kulđa) |
| easy | 쉬운 | swiun (swiun) | свиун (sviun) | свиун (sviun) |
| Four seasons are distinct. | 사계절(四季節)이 뚜렷하다. | Sagyejeori tturyeotada. (Sa-gye-jeol-i ttu-lyeos-ha-da.) | Сагеджори ттурётхада. (Sagedzhori tturyothada) | Сагјеђори ттурјотхада. (Sagjeđori tturjothada) |
| Just check the line color and width you want. | 원(願)하시는 선(線) 색(色)깔과 굵기에 체크하시면 됩니다. | Wonhasineun seon saekkkalgwa gulgie chekeuhasimyeon doemnida. (Won-ha-si-neun seon saeg-kkal-gwa gulg-gi-e che-keu-ha-si-myeon doeb-ni-da.) | Вонхасинын сон сэкккальгва кульккие чхекхыхасимён твемнида. (Vonhasinyn son sèkkal'gva kul'kkie chhekhyhasimyon tvemnida.) | Вонхасинун сон секкалгва кулгие ћ'ек'ухасимјон тоемнида. (Vonhasinun son sekkalgva kulgie ć'ek'uhasimjon toemnida.) |
| Republic of Korea | 대한민국 (大韓民國) | Daehan Minguk (Dae-han Min-gug) | Тэхан Мингук (Tèkhan Minguk) | Техан Мингук (Tehan Minguk) |
| Democratic People's Republic of Korea | 조선민주주의인민공화국 (朝鮮民主主義人民共和國) | Joseon Minjujuui Inmin Gonghwaguk (Jo-seon Min-ju-ju-ui In-min Gong-hwa-gug) | Чосон Минджуджуый Инмин Конхвагук (Choson Mindzhudzhuyy Inmin Konhvaguk) | Ћосон Минђуђууј Инмин Конгвагук (Ćoson Minđuđuuj Inmin Kongvaguk) |

== See also ==
- Romaja
- New Korean Orthography
- Hangul

== Notes ==
Korean personal names are written by family name first, followed by a space and then the given name. As a rule, syllables in given names are not separated.
