= Bogomol'nyi–Prasad–Sommerfield state =

State in supersymmetry

In theoretical physics, massive representations of an extended supersymmetry algebra called Bogomol'nyi–Prasad–Sommerfield (BPS) states (named after Evgeny Bogomolny, M.K. Prasad, and Charles M. Sommerfield) have mass equal to the supersymmetry central charge Z. Quantum mechanically, if the supersymmetry remains unbroken, exact equality to the modulus of Z exists. Their importance arises as the supermultiplets shorten for generic massive representations, with stability and mass formula exact.

== d = 4 N = 2 ==
The generators for the odd part of the superalgebra have relations:

$$\begin{align}
\{Q_\alpha^A , \bar{Q}_{\dot{\beta} B} \} & = 2 \sigma_{\alpha \dot{\beta}}^m P_m \delta^A_B\\
\{Q_\alpha^A , Q_\beta^B \} & = 2 \epsilon_{\alpha \beta} \epsilon^{A B} \bar{Z}\\
\{ \bar{Q}_{\dot{\alpha} A} , \bar{Q}_{\dot{\beta} B} \} & = -2 \epsilon_{\dot{\alpha} \dot{\beta}} \epsilon_{AB} Z\\
\end{align}$$

where: $\alpha \dot{\beta}$ are the Lorentz group indices, A and B are R-symmetry indices.

Take linear combinations of the above generators as follows:

$$\begin{align}
R_\alpha^A & = \xi^{-1} Q_\alpha^A + \xi \sigma_{\alpha \dot{\beta}}^0 \bar{Q}^{\dot{\beta} B}\\
T_\alpha^A & = \xi^{-1} Q_\alpha^A - \xi \sigma_{\alpha \dot{\beta}}^0 \bar{Q}^{\dot{\beta} B}\\
\end{align}$$

Consider a state ψ which has 4 momentum $(M,0,0,0)$. Applying the following operator to this state gives:

$$\begin{align}
(R_1^1 + (R_1^1)^\dagger )^2 \psi & = 4 ( M + Re(Z\xi^{2}) ) \psi\\
\end{align}$$

But because this is the square of a Hermitian operator, the right hand side coefficient must be positive for all $\xi$.

In particular the strongest result from this is

$$\begin{align}
M \geq |Z|\\
\end{align}$$

== Example applications ==
- Supersymmetric black hole entropies
- D-branes

== See also ==
- Bogomol'nyi–Prasad–Sommerfield bound
- Short supermultiplet
- Wall-crossing
