= BPS domain =

BPS
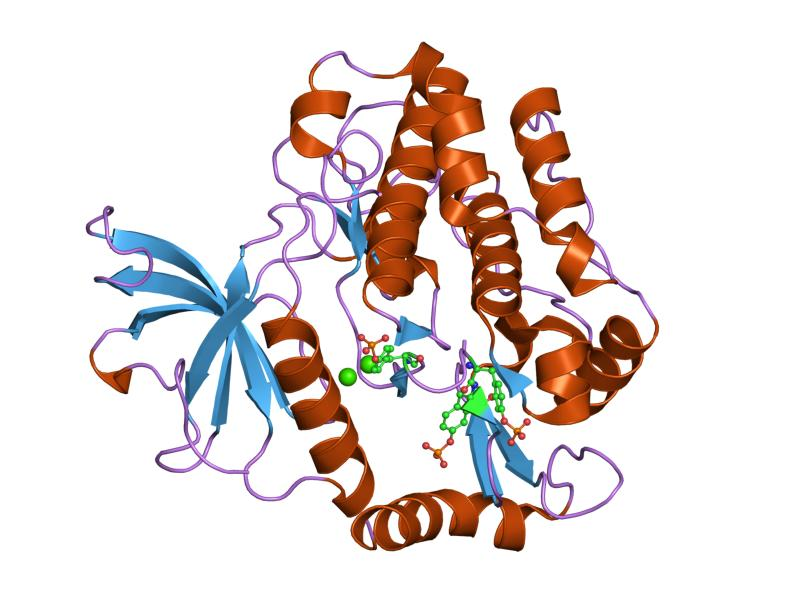
- crystal structure of the grb14 bps region in complex with the insulin receptor tyrosine kinase

Identifiers
- Symbol: BPS
- Pfam: PF08947
- InterPro: IPR015042
Available protein structures:
- Pfam: structures / ECOD
- PDB: RCSB PDB; PDBe; PDBj
- PDBsum: structure summary

In molecular biology, the BPS domain (Between PH and SH2) domain is a protein domain of approximately 45 amino acids found in the adaptor proteins Grb7/|Grb10/Grb14. It mediates inhibition of the tyrosine kinase domain of the insulin receptor by binding of the N-terminal portion of the BPS domain to the substrate peptide groove of the kinase, acting as a pseudosubstrate inhibitor. It is composed of two beta strands and a C-terminal helix.
