= Mirror symmetry (string theory) =

In physics and geometry: conjectured relation between pairs of Calabi–Yau manifolds

In algebraic geometry and theoretical physics, mirror symmetry is a relationship between geometric objects called Calabi–Yau manifolds. The term refers to a situation where two Calabi–Yau manifolds look very different geometrically but are nevertheless equivalent when employed as extra dimensions of string theory.

Early cases of mirror symmetry were discovered by physicists. Mathematicians became interested in this relationship around 1990 when Philip Candelas, Xenia de la Ossa, Paul Green, and Linda Parkes showed that it could be used as a tool in enumerative geometry, a branch of mathematics concerned with counting the number of solutions to geometric questions. Candelas and his collaborators showed that mirror symmetry could be used to count rational curves on a Calabi–Yau manifold, thus solving a longstanding problem. Although the original approach to mirror symmetry was based on physical ideas that were not understood in a mathematically precise way, some of its mathematical predictions have since been proven rigorously.

Today, mirror symmetry is a major research topic in pure mathematics, and mathematicians are working to develop a mathematical understanding of the relationship based on physicists' intuition. Mirror symmetry is also a fundamental tool for doing calculations in string theory, and it has been used to understand aspects of quantum field theory, the formalism that physicists use to describe elementary particles. Major approaches to mirror symmetry include the homological mirror symmetry program of Maxim Kontsevich, and the SYZ conjecture of Andrew Strominger, Shing-Tung Yau, and Eric Zaslow and its algebraic analog — the Gross-Siebert program of Mark Gross and Bernd Siebert.

== Overview ==
=== Strings and compactification ===
The fundamental objects of string theory are open and closed strings.

In physics, string theory is a theoretical framework in which the point-like particles of particle physics are replaced by one-dimensional objects called strings. These strings look like small segments or loops of ordinary string. String theory describes how strings propagate through space and interact with each other. On distance scales larger than the string scale, a string will look just like an ordinary particle, with its mass, charge, and other properties determined by the vibrational state of the string. Splitting and recombination of strings correspond to particle emission and absorption, giving rise to the interactions between particles.

There are notable differences between the world described by string theory and the everyday world. In everyday life, there are three familiar dimensions of space (up/down, left/right, and forward/backward), and there is one dimension of time (later/earlier). Thus, in the language of modern physics, one says that spacetime is four-dimensional. One of the peculiar features of string theory is that it requires extra dimensions of spacetime for its mathematical consistency. In superstring theory, the version of the theory that incorporates a theoretical idea called supersymmetry, there are six extra dimensions of spacetime in addition to the four that are familiar from everyday experience.

One of the goals of current research in string theory is to develop models in which the strings represent particles observed in high energy physics experiments. For such a model to be consistent with observations, its spacetime must be four-dimensional at the relevant distance scales, so one must look for ways to restrict the extra dimensions to smaller scales. In most realistic models of physics based on string theory, this is accomplished by a process called compactification, in which the extra dimensions are assumed to "close up" on themselves to form circles. In the limit where these curled up dimensions become very small, one obtains a theory in which spacetime has effectively a lower number of dimensions. A standard analogy for this is to consider a multidimensional object such as a garden hose. If the hose is viewed from a sufficient distance, it appears to have only one dimension, its length. However, as one approaches the hose, one discovers that it contains a second dimension, its circumference. Thus, an ant crawling on the surface of the hose would move in two dimensions.

=== Calabi–Yau manifolds ===
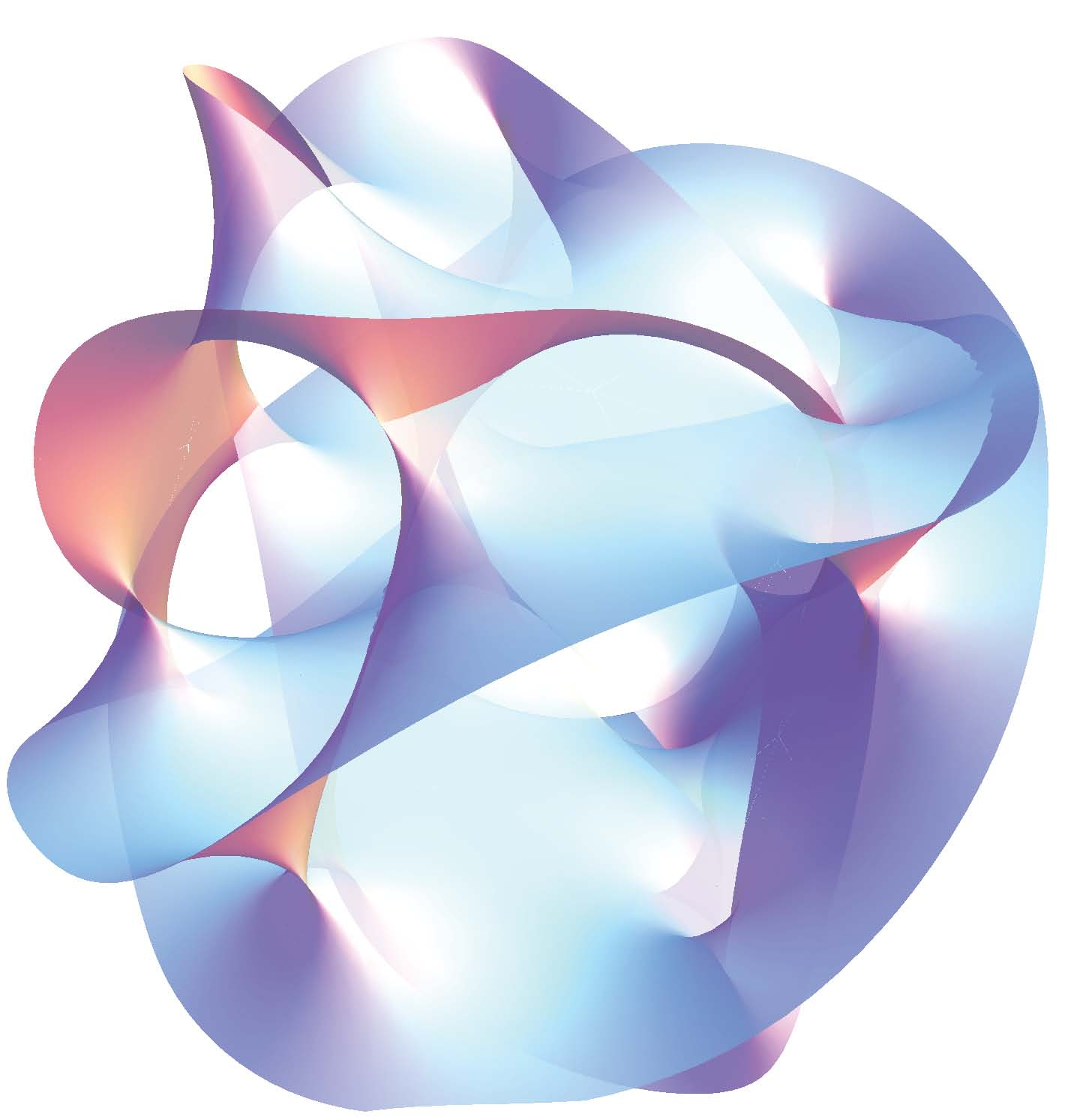
A cross section of a quintic Calabi–Yau manifold

Compactification can be used to construct models in which spacetime is effectively four-dimensional. However, not every way of compactifying the extra dimensions produces a model with the right properties to describe nature. In a viable model of particle physics, the compact extra dimensions must be shaped like a Calabi–Yau manifold. A Calabi–Yau manifold is a special space which is typically taken to be six-dimensional in applications to string theory. It is named after mathematicians Eugenio Calabi and Shing-Tung Yau.

After Calabi–Yau manifolds had entered physics as a way to compactify extra dimensions, many physicists began studying these manifolds. In the late 1980s, Lance Dixon, Wolfgang Lerche, Cumrun Vafa, and Nick Warner noticed that given such a compactification of string theory, it is not possible to reconstruct uniquely a corresponding Calabi–Yau manifold. Instead, two different versions of string theory called type IIA string theory and type IIB can be compactified on completely different Calabi–Yau manifolds giving rise to the same physics. (Note: The shape of a Calabi–Yau manifold is described mathematically using an array of numbers called Hodge numbers. The arrays corresponding to mirror Calabi–Yau manifolds are different in general, reflecting the different shapes of the manifolds, but they are related by a certain symmetry.) In this situation, the manifolds are called mirror manifolds, and the relationship between the two physical theories is called mirror symmetry.

The mirror symmetry relationship is a particular example of what physicists call a physical duality. In general, the term physical duality refers to a situation where two seemingly different physical theories turn out to be equivalent in a nontrivial way. If one theory can be transformed so it looks just like another theory, the two are said to be dual under that transformation. Put differently, the two theories are mathematically different descriptions of the same phenomena. Such dualities play an important role in modern physics, especially in string theory. (Note: Other dualities that arise in string theory are S-duality, T-duality, and the AdS/CFT correspondence.)

Regardless of whether Calabi–Yau compactifications of string theory provide a correct description of nature, the existence of the mirror duality between different string theories has significant mathematical consequences. The Calabi–Yau manifolds used in string theory are of interest in pure mathematics, and mirror symmetry allows mathematicians to solve problems in enumerative algebraic geometry, a branch of mathematics concerned with counting the numbers of solutions to geometric questions. A classical problem of enumerative geometry is to enumerate the rational curves on a Calabi–Yau manifold such as the one illustrated above. By applying mirror symmetry, mathematicians have translated this problem into an equivalent problem for the mirror Calabi–Yau, which turns out to be easier to solve.

In physics, mirror symmetry is justified on physical grounds. However, mathematicians generally require rigorous proofs that do not require an appeal to physical intuition. From a mathematical point of view, the version of mirror symmetry described above is still only a conjecture, but there is another version of mirror symmetry in the context of topological string theory, a simplified version of string theory introduced by Edward Witten, which has been rigorously proven by mathematicians. In the context of topological string theory, mirror symmetry states that two theories called the A-model and B-model are equivalent in the sense that there is a duality relating them. Today mirror symmetry is an active area of research in mathematics, and mathematicians are working to develop a more complete mathematical understanding of mirror symmetry based on physicists' intuition.

== History ==
The idea of mirror symmetry can be traced back to the mid-1980s when it was noticed that a string propagating on a circle of radius $R$ is physically equivalent to a string propagating on a circle of radius $1/R$ in appropriate units. This phenomenon is now known as T-duality and is understood to be closely related to mirror symmetry. In a paper from 1985, Philip Candelas, Gary Horowitz, Andrew Strominger, and Edward Witten showed that by compactifying string theory on a Calabi–Yau manifold, one obtains a theory roughly similar to the Standard Model of particle physics that also consistently incorporates an idea called supersymmetry. Following this development, many physicists began studying Calabi–Yau compactifications, hoping to construct realistic models of particle physics based on string theory. Cumrun Vafa and others noticed that given such a physical model, it is not possible to reconstruct uniquely a corresponding Calabi–Yau manifold. Instead, there are two Calabi–Yau manifolds that give rise to the same physics.

By studying the relationship between Calabi–Yau manifolds and certain conformal field theories called Gepner models, Brian Greene and Ronen Plesser found nontrivial examples of the mirror relationship. Further evidence for this relationship came from the work of Philip Candelas, Monika Lynker, and Rolf Schimmrigk, who surveyed a large number of Calabi–Yau manifolds by computer and found that they came in mirror pairs.

Mathematicians became interested in mirror symmetry around 1990 when physicists Philip Candelas, Xenia de la Ossa, Paul Green, and Linda Parkes showed that mirror symmetry could be used to solve problems in enumerative geometry that had resisted solution for decades or more. These results were presented to mathematicians at a conference at the Mathematical Sciences Research Institute (MSRI) in Berkeley, California in May 1991. During this conference, it was noticed that one of the numbers Candelas had computed for the counting of rational curves disagreed with the number obtained by Norwegian mathematicians Geir Ellingsrud and Stein Arild Strømme using ostensibly more rigorous techniques. Many mathematicians at the conference assumed that Candelas's work contained a mistake since it was not based on rigorous mathematical arguments. However, after examining their solution, Ellingsrud and Strømme discovered an error in their computer code and, upon fixing the code, they got an answer that agreed with the one obtained by Candelas and his collaborators.

In 1990, Edward Witten introduced topological string theory, a simplified version of string theory, and physicists showed that there is a version of mirror symmetry for topological string theory. This statement about topological string theory is usually taken as the definition of mirror symmetry in the mathematical literature. In an address at the International Congress of Mathematicians in 1994, mathematician Maxim Kontsevich presented a new mathematical conjecture based on the physical idea of mirror symmetry in topological string theory. Known as homological mirror symmetry, this conjecture formalizes mirror symmetry as an equivalence of two mathematical structures: the derived category of coherent sheaves on a Calabi–Yau manifold and the Fukaya category of its mirror.

Also around 1995, Kontsevich analyzed the results of Candelas, which gave a general formula for the problem of counting rational curves on a quintic threefold, and he reformulated these results as a precise mathematical conjecture. In 1996, Alexander Givental posted a paper that claimed to prove this conjecture of Kontsevich. Initially, many mathematicians found this paper hard to understand, so there were doubts about its correctness. Subsequently, Bong Lian, Kefeng Liu, and Shing-Tung Yau published an independent proof in a series of papers. Despite controversy over who had published the first proof, these papers are now collectively seen as providing a mathematical proof of the results originally obtained by physicists using mirror symmetry. In 2000, Kentaro Hori and Cumrun Vafa gave another physical proof of mirror symmetry based on T-duality.

Work on mirror symmetry continues today with major developments in the context of strings on surfaces with boundaries. In addition, mirror symmetry has been related to many active areas of mathematics research, such as the McKay correspondence, topological quantum field theory, and the theory of stability conditions. At the same time, basic questions continue to vex. For example, mathematicians still lack an understanding of how to construct examples of mirror Calabi–Yau pairs, though there has been progress in understanding this issue.

== Applications ==
=== Enumerative geometry ===
Circles of Apollonius: Eight colored circles are tangent to the three black circles.

Many of the important mathematical applications of mirror symmetry belong to the branch of mathematics called enumerative geometry. In enumerative geometry, one is interested in counting the number of solutions to geometric questions, typically using the techniques of algebraic geometry. One of the earliest problems of enumerative geometry was posed around the year 200 BCE by the ancient Greek mathematician Apollonius, who asked how many circles in the plane are tangent to three given circles. In general, the solution to the problem of Apollonius is that there are eight such circles.

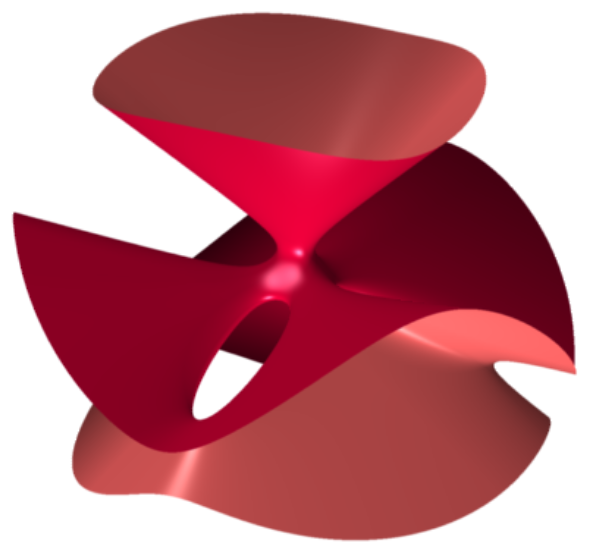
The Clebsch cubic

Enumerative problems in mathematics often concern a class of geometric objects called algebraic varieties which are defined by the vanishing of polynomials. For example, the Clebsch cubic (see the illustration) is defined using a certain polynomial of degree three in four variables. A celebrated result of nineteenth-century mathematicians Arthur Cayley and George Salmon states that there are exactly 27 straight lines that lie entirely on such a surface.

Generalizing this problem, one can ask how many lines can be drawn on a quintic Calabi–Yau manifold, such as the one illustrated above, which is defined by a polynomial of degree five. This problem was solved by the nineteenth-century German mathematician Hermann Schubert, who found that there are exactly 2,875 such lines. In 1986, geometer Sheldon Katz proved that the number of curves, such as circles, that are defined by polynomials of degree two and lie entirely in the quintic is 609,250.

By the year 1991, most of the classical problems of enumerative geometry had been solved and interest in enumerative geometry had begun to diminish. According to mathematician Mark Gross, "As the old problems had been solved, people went back to check Schubert's numbers with modern techniques, but that was getting pretty stale." The field was reinvigorated in May 1991 when physicists Philip Candelas, Xenia de la Ossa, Paul Green, and Linda Parkes showed that mirror symmetry could be used to count the number of degree three curves on a quintic Calabi–Yau. Candelas and his collaborators found that these six-dimensional Calabi–Yau manifolds can contain exactly 317,206,375 curves of degree three.

In addition to counting degree-three curves on a quintic three-fold, Candelas and his collaborators obtained a number of more general results for counting rational curves which went far beyond the results obtained by mathematicians. Although the methods used in this work were based on physical intuition, mathematicians have gone on to prove rigorously some of the predictions of mirror symmetry. In particular, the enumerative predictions of mirror symmetry have now been rigorously proven.

=== Theoretical physics ===
In addition to its applications in enumerative geometry, mirror symmetry is a fundamental tool for doing calculations in string theory. In the A-model of topological string theory, physically interesting quantities are expressed in terms of infinitely many numbers called Gromov–Witten invariants, which are extremely difficult to compute. In the B-model, the calculations can be reduced to classical integrals and are much easier. By applying mirror symmetry, theorists can translate difficult calculations in the A-model into equivalent but technically easier calculations in the B-model. These calculations are then used to determine the probabilities of various physical processes in string theory. Mirror symmetry can be combined with other dualities to translate calculations in one theory into equivalent calculations in a different theory. By outsourcing calculations to different theories in this way, theorists can calculate quantities that are impossible to calculate without the use of dualities.

Outside of string theory, mirror symmetry is used to understand aspects of quantum field theory, the formalism that physicists use to describe elementary particles. For example, gauge theories are a class of highly symmetric physical theories appearing in the standard model of particle physics and other parts of theoretical physics. Some gauge theories which are not part of the standard model, but which are nevertheless important for theoretical reasons, arise from strings propagating on a nearly singular background. For such theories, mirror symmetry is a useful computational tool. Indeed, mirror symmetry can be used to perform calculations in an important gauge theory in four spacetime dimensions that was studied by Nathan Seiberg and Edward Witten and is also familiar in mathematics in the context of Donaldson invariants. There is also a generalization of mirror symmetry called 3D mirror symmetry which relates pairs of quantum field theories in three spacetime dimensions.

== Approaches ==
=== Homological mirror symmetry ===
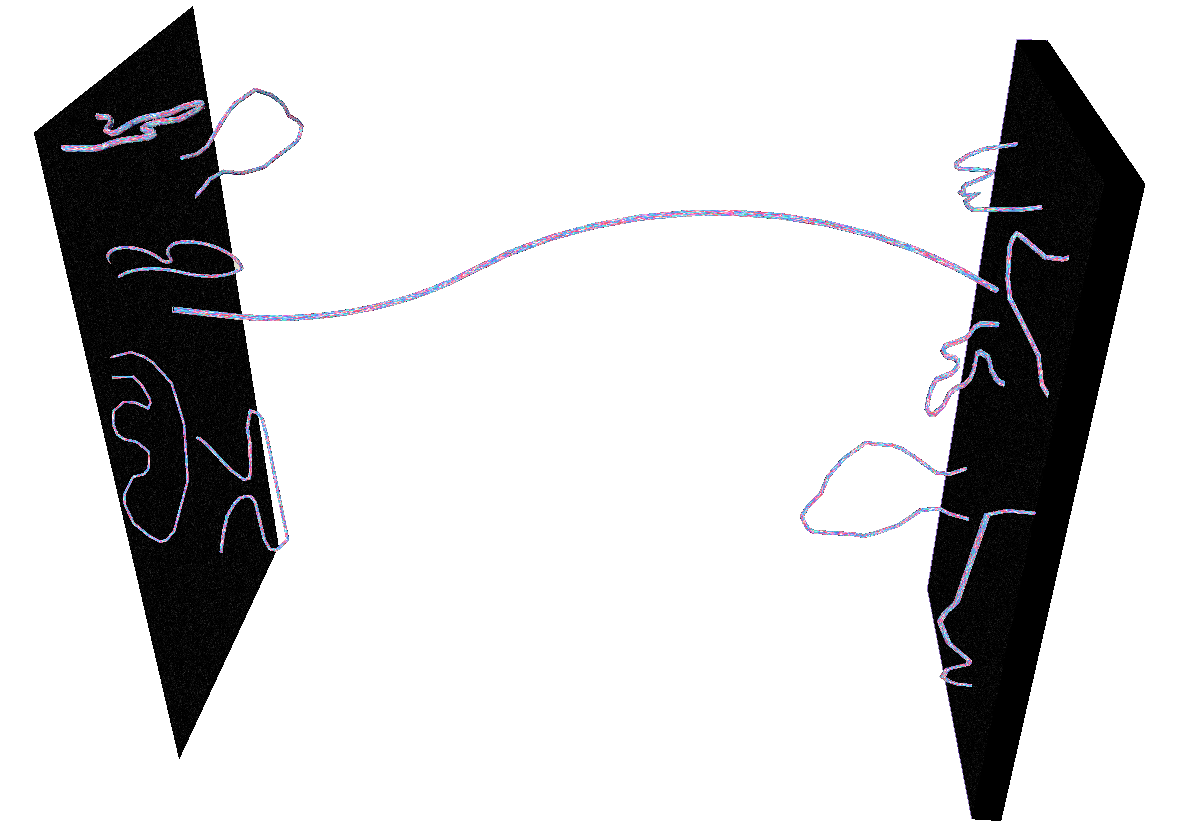
Open strings attached to a pair of D-branes

In string theory and related theories in physics, a brane is a physical object that generalizes the notion of a point particle to higher dimensions. For example, a point particle can be viewed as a brane of dimension zero, while a string can be viewed as a brane of dimension one. It is also possible to consider higher-dimensional branes. The word brane comes from the word "membrane" which refers to a two-dimensional brane.

In string theory, a string may be open (forming a segment with two endpoints) or closed (forming a closed loop). D-branes are an important class of branes that arise when one considers open strings. As an open string propagates through spacetime, its endpoints are required to lie on a D-brane. The letter "D" in D-brane refers to a condition that it satisfies, the Dirichlet boundary condition.

Mathematically, branes can be described using the notion of a category. This is a mathematical structure consisting of objects, and for any pair of objects, a set of morphisms between them. In most examples, the objects are mathematical structures (such as sets, vector spaces, or topological spaces) and the morphisms are functions between these structures. One can also consider categories where the objects are D-branes and the morphisms between two branes $\alpha$ and $\beta$ are states of open strings stretched between $\alpha$ and $\beta$.

In the B-model of topological string theory, the D-branes are complex submanifolds of a Calabi–Yau together with additional data that arise physically from having charges at the endpoints of strings. Intuitively, one can think of a submanifold as a surface embedded inside the Calabi–Yau, although submanifolds can also exist in dimensions different from two. In mathematical language, the category having these branes as its objects is known as the derived category of coherent sheaves on the Calabi–Yau. In the A-model, the D-branes can again be viewed as submanifolds of a Calabi–Yau manifold. Roughly speaking, they are what mathematicians call special Lagrangian submanifolds. This means among other things that they have half the dimension of the space in which they sit, and they are length-, area-, or volume-minimizing. The category having these branes as its objects is called the Fukaya category.

The derived category of coherent sheaves is constructed using tools from complex geometry, a branch of mathematics that describes geometric curves in algebraic terms and solves geometric problems using algebraic equations. On the other hand, the Fukaya category is constructed using symplectic geometry, a branch of mathematics that arose from studies of classical physics. Symplectic geometry studies spaces equipped with a symplectic form, a mathematical tool that can be used to compute area in two-dimensional examples.

The homological mirror symmetry conjecture of Maxim Kontsevich states that the derived category of coherent sheaves on one Calabi–Yau manifold is equivalent in a certain sense to the Fukaya category of its mirror. This equivalence provides a precise mathematical formulation of mirror symmetry in topological string theory. In addition, it provides an unexpected bridge between two branches of geometry, namely complex and symplectic geometry.

=== Strominger–Yau–Zaslow conjecture ===
A torus can be viewed as a union of infinitely many circles such as the red one in the picture. There is one such circle for each point on the pink circle.

Another approach to understanding mirror symmetry was suggested by Andrew Strominger, Shing-Tung Yau, and Eric Zaslow in 1996. According to their conjecture, now known as the SYZ conjecture, mirror symmetry can be understood by dividing a Calabi–Yau manifold into simpler pieces and then transforming them to get the mirror Calabi–Yau.

The simplest example of a Calabi–Yau manifold is a two-dimensional torus or donut shape. Consider a circle on this surface that goes once through the hole of the donut. An example is the red circle in the figure. There are infinitely many circles like it on a torus; in fact, the entire surface is a union of such circles.

One can choose an auxiliary circle $B$ (the pink circle in the figure) such that each of the infinitely many circles decomposing the torus passes through a point of $B$. This auxiliary circle is said to parametrize the circles of the decomposition, meaning there is a correspondence between them and points of $B$. The circle $B$ is more than just a list, however, because it also determines how these circles are arranged on the torus. This auxiliary space plays an important role in the SYZ conjecture.

The idea of dividing a torus into pieces parametrized by an auxiliary space can be generalized. Increasing the dimension from two to four real dimensions, the Calabi–Yau becomes a K3 surface. Just as the torus was decomposed into circles, a four-dimensional K3 surface can be decomposed into two-dimensional tori. In this case the space $B$ is an ordinary sphere. Each point on the sphere corresponds to one of the two-dimensional tori, except for twenty-four "bad" points corresponding to "pinched" or singular tori.

The Calabi–Yau manifolds of primary interest in string theory have six dimensions. One can divide such a manifold into 3-tori (three-dimensional objects that generalize the notion of a torus) parametrized by a 3-sphere $B$ (a three-dimensional generalization of a sphere). Each point of $B$ corresponds to a 3-torus, except for infinitely many "bad" points which form a grid-like pattern of segments on the Calabi–Yau and correspond to singular tori.

Once the Calabi–Yau manifold has been decomposed into simpler parts, mirror symmetry can be understood in an intuitive geometric way. As an example, consider the torus described above. Imagine that this torus represents the "spacetime" for a physical theory. The fundamental objects of this theory will be strings propagating through the spacetime according to the rules of quantum mechanics. One of the basic dualities of string theory is T-duality, which states that a string propagating around a circle of radius $R$ is equivalent to a string propagating around a circle of radius $1/R$ in the sense that all observable quantities in one description are identified with quantities in the dual description. For example, a string has momentum as it propagates around a circle, and it can also wind around the circle one or more times. The number of times the string winds around a circle is called the winding number. If a string has momentum $p$ and winding number $n$ in one description, it will have momentum $n$ and winding number $p$ in the dual description. By applying T-duality simultaneously to all of the circles that decompose the torus, the radii of these circles become inverted, and one is left with a new torus which is "fatter" or "skinnier" than the original. This torus is the mirror of the original Calabi–Yau.

T-duality can be extended from circles to the two-dimensional tori appearing in the decomposition of a K3 surface or to the three-dimensional tori appearing in the decomposition of a six-dimensional Calabi–Yau manifold. In general, the SYZ conjecture states that mirror symmetry is equivalent to the simultaneous application of T-duality to these tori. In each case, the space $B$ provides a kind of blueprint that describes how these tori are assembled into a Calabi–Yau manifold.

== See also ==
- Donaldson–Thomas theory
- Wall-crossing
