= Bernd Siebert =

German mathematician

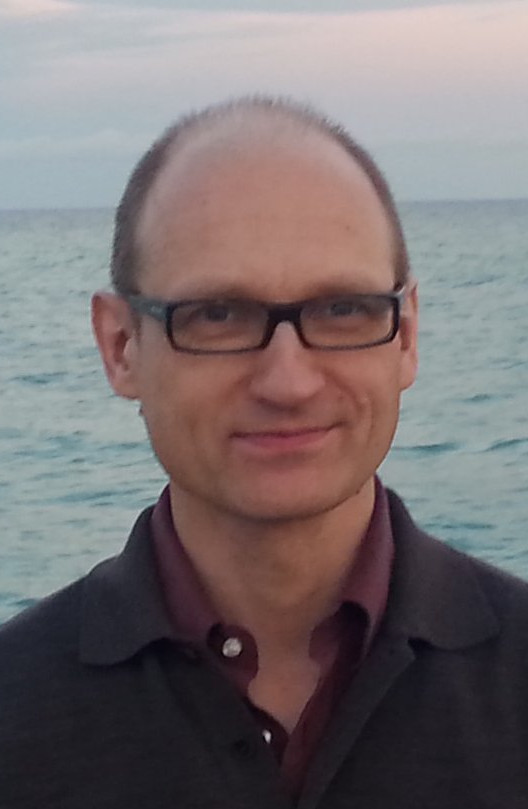
- Siebert in 2014
- Born: 5 March 1964 (age 62); Berlin-Wilmersdorf, West Berlin, West Germany
- Occupation: German mathematician
- Awards: Clay Research Award (2016)
- Website: web.ma.utexas.edu/users/siebert/

Bernd Siebert (born 5 March 1964 in Berlin-Wilmersdorf) is a German mathematician who researches in algebraic geometry.

== Life ==
Siebert studied mathematics starting 1984 at the University of Erlangen. In 1986, he changed to the University of Bonn and in 1987 to the University of Göttingen where he finished his Diplom in 1989 under the supervision of Hans Grauert with distinction. He became Grauert's PhD student and assistant in Göttingen. He received his PhD in 1992 (Faserzykelräume, geometrische Plattifikation und meromorphe Äquivalenzrelationen). A stay at the Courant Institute followed in 1993–94 after which we went to Bochum. In 1997–98 he spent some time at the MIT as a visiting scholar before completing his habilitation in Bochum in 1998 (Gromov–Witten invariants for general symplectic manifolds). As a DFG-Heisenberg Fellow, he went to the University of Paris VI/University of Paris VII from 2000 to 2002. From there, he was called to a professorship at the Albert-Ludwigs-Universität Freiburg in 2002. He moved on to the Universität Hamburg in 2008, and in 2011, he became the head of the Graduiertenkolleg Mathematics Inspired by String Theory and QFT. In 2018, Siebert joined the faculty of the University of Texas at Austin as a professor of mathematics and holds the Sid W. Richardson Foundation Regents Chair in Mathematics #4.

In his research, Bernd Siebert contributed substantially to the theory of Gromov–Witten invariants. Around 2002 by his insights in logarithmic geometry, he entered into an ongoing joint research program with Mark Gross. This generated a sequence of relevant papers that relate to mirror symmetry and tropical geometry.

In 2014, jointly with Mark Gross, he became an invited speaker at the International Congress of Mathematics in Seoul for the section complex geometry (Local mirror symmetry in the tropics). Both of them were awarded the Clay Research Award in 2016.

== Papers ==
- Gross, Mark; Siebert, Bernd (20 November 2012). "Logarithmic Gromov-Witten invariants". Journal of the American Mathematical Society. 26 (2). American Mathematical Society (AMS): 451–510. arXiv:1102.4322. doi:10.1090/s0894-0347-2012-00757-7. ISSN 0894-0347. S2CID 85559977.
- Gross, Mark; Siebert, Bernd (1 November 2011). "From real affine geometry to complex geometry". Annals of Mathematics. 174 (3): 1301–1428. arXiv:math/0703822. doi:10.4007/annals.2011.174.3.1. ISSN 0003-486X. S2CID 119659302.
- Gross, Mark; Pandharipande, Rahul; Siebert, Bernd (1 June 2010). "The tropical vertex". Duke Mathematical Journal. 153 (2). Duke University Press. arXiv:0902.0779. doi:10.1215/00127094-2010-025. ISSN 0012-7094. S2CID 17019428.
- Nishinou, Takeo; Siebert, Bernd (1 October 2006). "Toric degenerations of toric varieties and tropical curves". Duke Mathematical Journal. 135 (1). Duke University Press. arXiv:math/0409060. doi:10.1215/s0012-7094-06-13511-1. ISSN 0012-7094. S2CID 14934551.
- Siebert, Bernd; Tian, Gang (1 March 2005). "On the holomorphicity of genus two Lefschetz fibrations". Annals of Mathematics. 161 (2): 959–1020. arXiv:math/0305343. doi:10.4007/annals.2005.161.959. ISSN 0003-486X. S2CID 10474543.
- Siebert, Bernd (22 February 1999). "Algebraic and symplectic Gromov-Witten invariants coincide". Annales de l'Institut Fourier. 49 (6): 1743–1795. arXiv:math/9804108. doi:10.5802/aif.1737. ISSN 0373-0956. S2CID 15263677.
