= Nataša Šešum =

Mathematician

Nataša Šešum is a professor of mathematics at Rutgers University, specializing in partial differential equations and geometric flow.

== Education ==
Šešum earned her PhD in 2004 from the Massachusetts Institute of Technology under the supervision of Gang Tian. Her dissertation was Limiting Behavior of Ricci Flows.

== Awards and honors ==
Šešum was an invited speaker at the International Congress of Mathematicians in 2014. In 2015 she was elected as a fellow of the American Mathematical Society. She was named MSRI Simons Professor for 2015–2016. She was awarded the 2023 AMS Ruth Lyttle Satter Prize in Mathematics.
