= Bogomol'nyi–Prasad–Sommerfield bound =

Lower energy limit in string theory

In the classical bosonic sector of a supersymmetric field theory, the Bogomol'nyi–Prasad–Sommerfield (BPS) bound (named after Evgeny Bogomolny, M.K. Prasad, and Charles Sommerfield) provides a lower limit on the energy of static field configurations, depending on their topological charges or boundary conditions at spatial infinity. This bound manifests as a series of inequalities for solutions of the classical bosonic field equations. Saturating this bound, meaning the energy of the configuration equals the bound, leads to a simplified set of first-order partial differential equations known as the Bogomolny equations. Classical solutions that saturate the BPS bound are called "BPS states". These BPS states are not only important solutions within the classical bosonic theory but also play a crucial role in the full quantum supersymmetric theory, often corresponding to stable, non-perturbative states in both field theory and string theory. Their existence and properties are deeply connected to the underlying supersymmetry of the theory, even though the bound itself can be formulated within the bosonic sector alone.

In theoretical physics, specifically in theories with extended supersymmetry, the BPS bound is a lower limit on the mass of a physical state in terms of its charges. States that saturate this bound are known as BPS states, and they have special properties, such as being invariant under some fraction of the supersymmetry transformations. The acronym BPS stands for Bogomol'nyi, Prasad, and Sommerfield, who first derived the bound in the context of magnetic monopoles in Yang-Mills theory in 1975.

== Overview ==
Supersymmetry is a theoretical framework that relates bosons and fermions, particles with integer and half-integer spin, respectively. Extended supersymmetry involves multiple supersymmetry generators, denoted by $Q_\alpha^I$, where $\alpha$ is a spinor index and $I = 1, \dots, N$ labels the different supersymmetry generators. The supersymmetry algebra includes anticommutators of these generators, which typically involve the Hamiltonian (energy operator) $H$, momentum operators $P_i$, and central charges $Z^I$ and $Z^{IJ}$. Central charges are operators that commute with all other operators in the supersymmetry algebra and are typically topological charges.

The BPS bound arises from the positivity of the norm of states in the Hilbert space. Consider the following anticommutator from the supersymmetry algebra:

$\{Q_\alpha^I, (Q_\beta^J)^\dagger\} = \delta^{IJ} \sigma^\mu_{\alpha\beta} P_\mu + \delta_{\alpha\beta} Z^{IJ} + \dots$

where $\sigma^\mu$ are the Pauli matrices (or their higher-dimensional generalizations), $P_\mu$ is the four-momentum, and $Z^{IJ}$ are the central charges. Taking the expectation value of this anticommutator in a physical state $|\psi\rangle$, we obtain:

$\langle \psi | \{Q_\alpha^I, (Q_\beta^J)^\dagger\} | \psi \rangle = \langle \psi | Q_\alpha^I (Q_\beta^J)^\dagger | \psi \rangle + \langle \psi | (Q_\beta^J)^\dagger Q_\alpha^I | \psi \rangle \ge 0$

Since the norm of any state is non-negative, this leads to the inequality:

$M \ge |Z|$

where $M$ is the mass of the state (in the rest frame, where $P_\mu = (M, 0, 0, 0)$) and $Z$ is a linear combination of the central charges. This inequality is the BPS bound.

== BPS states ==
States that satisfy the BPS bound, i.e., $M = |Z|$, are called BPS states. They have the following important properties:

- Short multiplets: BPS states form shorter irreducible representations of the supersymmetry algebra compared to generic states. This is because some of the supersymmetry generators annihilate the BPS states, reducing the number of states in the multiplet.
- Stability: BPS states are often stable against quantum corrections. Their mass is protected from renormalization, meaning it does not change as one varies the parameters of the theory. This stability makes BPS states crucial for studying non-perturbative aspects of supersymmetric theories.
- Supersymmetry preservation: BPS states preserve a fraction of the supersymmetry. Specifically, if a state saturates the BPS bound, some linear combination of the supersymmetry generators must annihilate the state: $(Q_\alpha^I + \eta_{\alpha I} (Q_\beta^J)^\dagger )| \psi \rangle = 0$ for some spinor $\eta_{\alpha I}$. The number of independent supersymmetry generators that annihilate the state determines the fraction of supersymmetry preserved.

== Examples ==
BPS bounds and states appear in various contexts in theoretical physics:

- Magnetic Monopoles: The original BPS bound was derived for magnetic monopoles in Yang-Mills theory. The mass of the monopole is bounded by its magnetic charge.
- Solitons and D-branes: In string theory, BPS states include solitons like D-branes. The mass of a D-brane is determined by its tension, which is related to its charge under the Ramond-Ramond fields.
- Supersymmetric Gauge Theories: BPS states play a crucial role in understanding the dynamics of supersymmetric gauge theories, such as N=4 Super Yang-Mills theory. They provide insights into the non-perturbative behavior of these theories and are related to the concept of S-duality.
- Black Holes: In supergravity and string theory, extremal black holes can be BPS states. Their mass is related to their charge and angular momentum.

== Significance ==
The BPS bound and BPS states are powerful tools for studying supersymmetric theories. They provide a window into the non-perturbative regime of these theories and allow for exact calculations of certain quantities. BPS states have played a crucial role in the development of string theory, the AdS/CFT correspondence, and our understanding of black hole physics.

== Example ==
=== Monopoles and dyons ===
The concept of the BPS bound first arose in the study of magnetic monopoles in non-abelian gauge theories. Specifically, it was shown that the mass of a 't Hooft-Polyakov monopole and a Julia-Zee dyon is bounded from below by a quantity proportional to its topological charge. Solutions that saturate this bound are called BPS monopoles or BPS dyons, and they possess special properties and play a significant role in both classical and quantum field theory.

==== 't Hooft-Polyakov monopole ====
The 't Hooft-Polyakov monopole is a static, finite-energy solution in a non-abelian gauge theory, typically SU(2), spontaneously broken to U(1) by a scalar Higgs field in the adjoint representation. The Lagrangian for the bosonic sector is given by:

$\mathcal{L} = -\frac{1}{4} F_{\mu\nu}^a F^{a\mu\nu} + \frac{1}{2} (D_\mu \phi)^a (D^\mu \phi)^a - V(\phi)$

where $F_{\mu\nu}^a$ is the field strength tensor, $D_\mu$ is the covariant derivative, $\phi^a$ is the Higgs field in the adjoint representation, and $V(\phi)$ is the Higgs potential, often taken to be $V(\phi) = \frac{\lambda}{4} (|\phi|^2 - v^2)^2$, where $v$ is the vacuum expectation value of the Higgs field.

The energy of a static field configuration is given by:

$E = \int d^3x \left[ \frac{1}{2} B_i^a B_i^a + \frac{1}{2} (D_i \phi)^a (D_i \phi)^a + V(\phi) \right]$

where $B_i^a = \frac{1}{2} \epsilon_{ijk} F_{jk}^a$ is the magnetic field.

In the limit where the Higgs self-coupling $\lambda$ goes to zero (the BPS limit), it can be shown that the energy is bounded by the magnetic charge:

$E \ge |Q_M| v$

where $Q_M = \frac{1}{4\pi} \int dS_i B_i^a \hat{\phi}^a$ is the magnetic charge, with $\hat{\phi}^a = \phi^a/|\phi|$. This inequality is the BPS bound for the monopole.

The BPS bound is saturated when the following Bogomolny equations are satisfied:

$B_i^a = \pm D_i \phi^a$

Solutions to these first-order equations are the BPS monopoles, which have the minimal energy for a given magnetic charge. The choice of sign in the Bogomolny equation determines whether the monopole is a regular monopole or an antimonopole.

==== Julia–Zee dyon ====
The Julia–Zee dyon is a generalization of the 't Hooft-Polyakov monopole that also carries electric charge. This is achieved by adding a term proportional to $\theta F_{\mu\nu}^a \tilde{F}^{a\mu\nu}$ to the Lagrangian, where $\theta$ is the vacuum angle and $\tilde{F}^{a\mu\nu}$ is the dual field strength tensor. This term introduces a coupling between the electric and magnetic fields.

The energy of a static dyon configuration is bounded by:

$E \ge \sqrt{Q_M^2 v^2 + Q_E^2}$

where $Q_E$ is the electric charge. This is the BPS bound for the dyon. The bound is saturated when the following generalized Bogomolny equations are satisfied:

$B_i^a = \pm D_i \phi^a$ $E_i^a = \mp \frac{Q_E}{Q_M v} D_i \phi^a$

where $E_i^a = F_{0i}^a$ is the electric field. Solutions to these equations are the BPS dyons, which have the minimal energy for given electric and magnetic charges.

==== Significance ====
The BPS monopoles and dyons are important because they are stable, finite-energy solutions that saturate a classical energy bound. Their existence and properties are closely related to the topology of the gauge group and the Higgs field. Moreover, these classical solutions have quantum counterparts, and the BPS bound plays a crucial role in understanding the spectrum of the quantum theory. In supersymmetric extensions of the theory, BPS states correspond to short representations of the supersymmetry algebra and are protected from quantum corrections.

=== Extremal Reissner–Nordström black holes ===
The Reissner-Nordström metric describes the spacetime geometry around a spherically symmetric, electrically charged black hole. The metric is characterized by two parameters: the mass $M$ and the electric charge $Q$ of the black hole. The ADM mass, a concept from general relativity that defines the total mass-energy of an asymptotically flat spacetime, is simply $M$ for the Reissner-Nordström solution.

The event horizon(s) of the Reissner-Nordström black hole are located at the radial coordinates where the metric component $g_{tt}$ vanishes. This leads to the equation:

$r^2 - 2Mr + Q^2 = 0$

The solutions are given by:

$r_\pm = M \pm \sqrt{M^2 - Q^2}$

When $M > |Q|$, there are two horizons: an outer event horizon $r_+$ and an inner Cauchy horizon $r_-$. When $M < |Q|$, there are no horizons, and the singularity is naked, which is generally considered unphysical. The critical case, where $M = |Q|$, is known as the extremal Reissner-Nordström black hole, and in this case, the two horizons coincide:

$r_+ = r_- = M = |Q|$

In the context of supergravity theories (supersymmetric extensions of general relativity), extremal Reissner-Nordström black holes can be interpreted as BPS states. This connection arises from the fact that the extremality condition $M = |Q|$ can be viewed as a saturation of a classical inequality, analogous to the BPS bound in supersymmetric field theories.

==== Classical inequalities and energy conditions ====
In general relativity, various energy conditions are imposed on the stress-energy tensor $T_{\mu\nu}$ to ensure physically reasonable behavior of matter and energy. One such condition is the weak energy condition, which states that for any timelike vector $V^\mu$, the following inequality holds:

$T_{\mu\nu} V^\mu V^\nu \ge 0$

This essentially means that the energy density measured by any observer is non-negative. For the electromagnetic field, which is the source of the Reissner-Nordström black hole's charge, the weak energy condition translates to:

$\frac{1}{4\pi} \left( E^2 + B^2 \right) \geq 0$

where $E$ and $B$ are electric and magnetic field strengths.

For the Reissner-Nordström solution, the total energy, which is the ADM mass $M$, can be decomposed into contributions from the gravitational field and the electromagnetic field. It can be shown that the electromagnetic contribution is precisely equal to $|Q|$, the absolute value of the charge. The weak energy condition then implies that the gravitational contribution must be non-negative. This leads to the inequality:

$M \ge |Q|$

This inequality is strikingly similar to the BPS bound, with the ADM mass playing the role of the energy and the electric charge playing the role of the central charge. The extremal Reissner-Nordström black hole, with $M = |Q|$, saturates this inequality, making it a classical analog of a BPS state.

==== Supersymmetry and extremal black holes ====
In the context of $N=2$ supergravity, the extremal Reissner-Nordström black hole is not just an analog but a true BPS state. The supersymmetry algebra in this theory includes central charges that are proportional to the electric and magnetic charges of the black hole. The BPS bound then becomes:

$M \ge \sqrt{Q^2 + P^2}$

where $P$ is the magnetic charge (which is zero for the Reissner-Nordström solution we are considering). The extremal black hole, with $M = |Q|$, saturates this bound and preserves half of the supersymmetry. This means that some of the supersymmetry transformations leave the black hole solution invariant.

The fact that extremal black holes can be BPS states has profound implications. It suggests a deep connection between gravity, supersymmetry, and the quantum nature of spacetime. BPS black holes are stable against quantum corrections and provide valuable insights into the microscopic structure of black holes and the nature of quantum gravity.

== See also ==
- Supersymmetry
- Central charge
- Magnetic monopole
- D-brane
- Extremal black hole
