= Wall-crossing =

Discontinuous change of a quantity in algebraic geometry or string theory

In algebraic geometry and string theory, the phenomenon of wall-crossing describes the discontinuous change of a certain quantity, such as an integer geometric invariant, an index or a space of BPS state, across a codimension-one wall in a space of stability conditions, a so-called wall of marginal stability.
