= Eric Zaslow =

American mathematical physicist

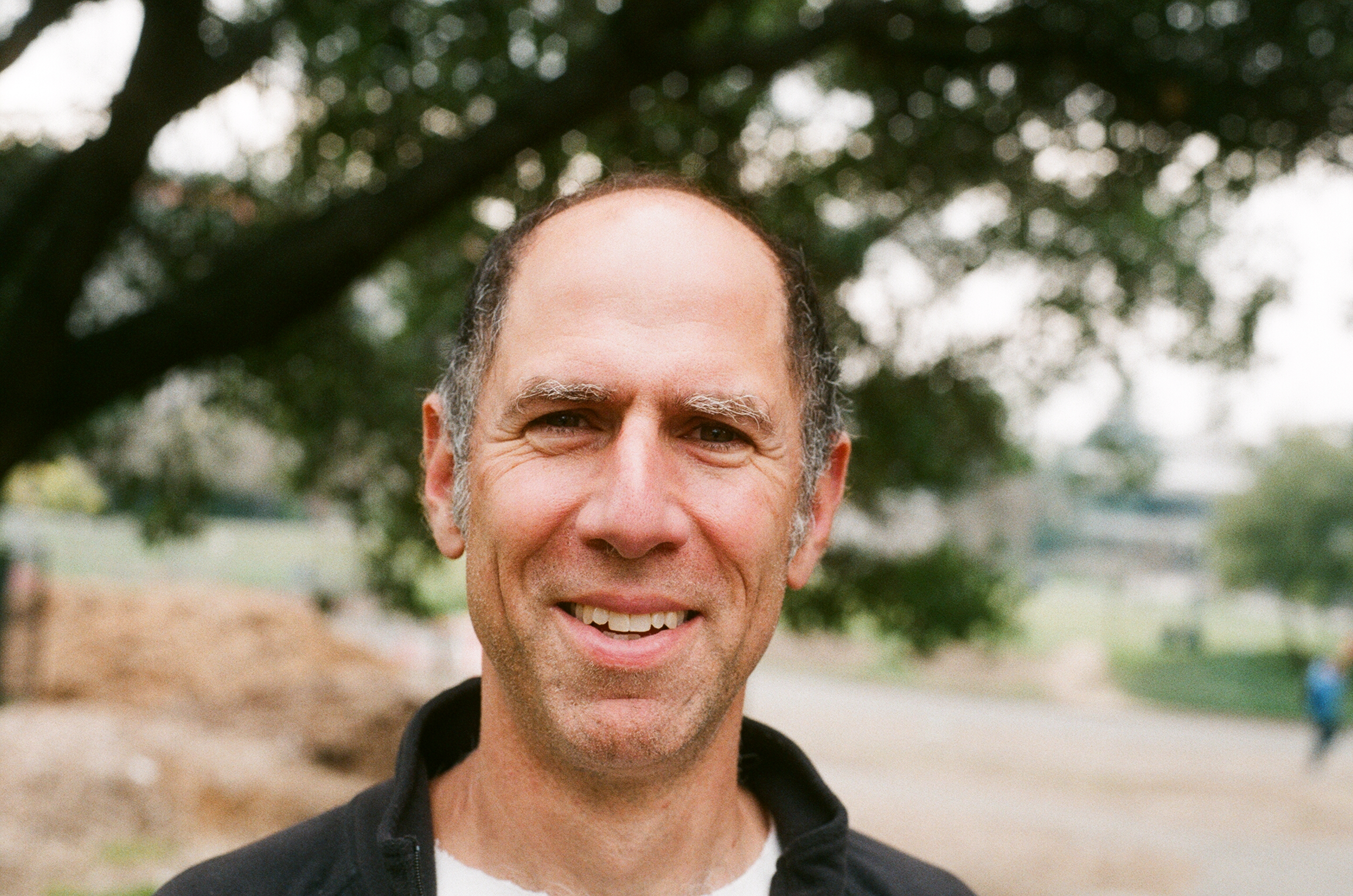
- Zaslow in 2017
- Education: Harvard University (PhD, 1995); Harvard University (MA, 1990); Dartmouth College (MA, 1989); Dartmouth College (BA, 1989)
- Scientific career
- Fields: Mathematics
- Institutions: Northwestern University
- Thesis: Kinks, twists, and folds : exploring the geometric musculature of quantum field theory (1995)
- Doctoral advisor: Cumrun Vafa
- Website: https://sites.math.northwestern.edu/~zaslow/

Eric Zaslow is an American mathematical physicist at Northwestern University.

== Biography ==
Zaslow attended Harvard University, earning his Ph.D. in physics in 1995, with thesis "Kinks, twists, and folds : exploring the geometric musculature of quantum field theory" written under the direction of Cumrun Vafa. His research focuses on mathematical questions arising from duality symmetries in theoretical physics such as mirror symmetry. With Andrew Strominger and Shing-Tung Yau, he formulated the SYZ conjecture.

He was named to the 2021 class of fellows of the American Mathematical Society "for contributions to mathematical physics and mirror symmetry".

Zaslow is also known for being internationally ranked in ultimate, with seven world or national championships and has written limericks about physics competitively.
