= Richard S. Hamilton =

American mathematician (1943–2024)

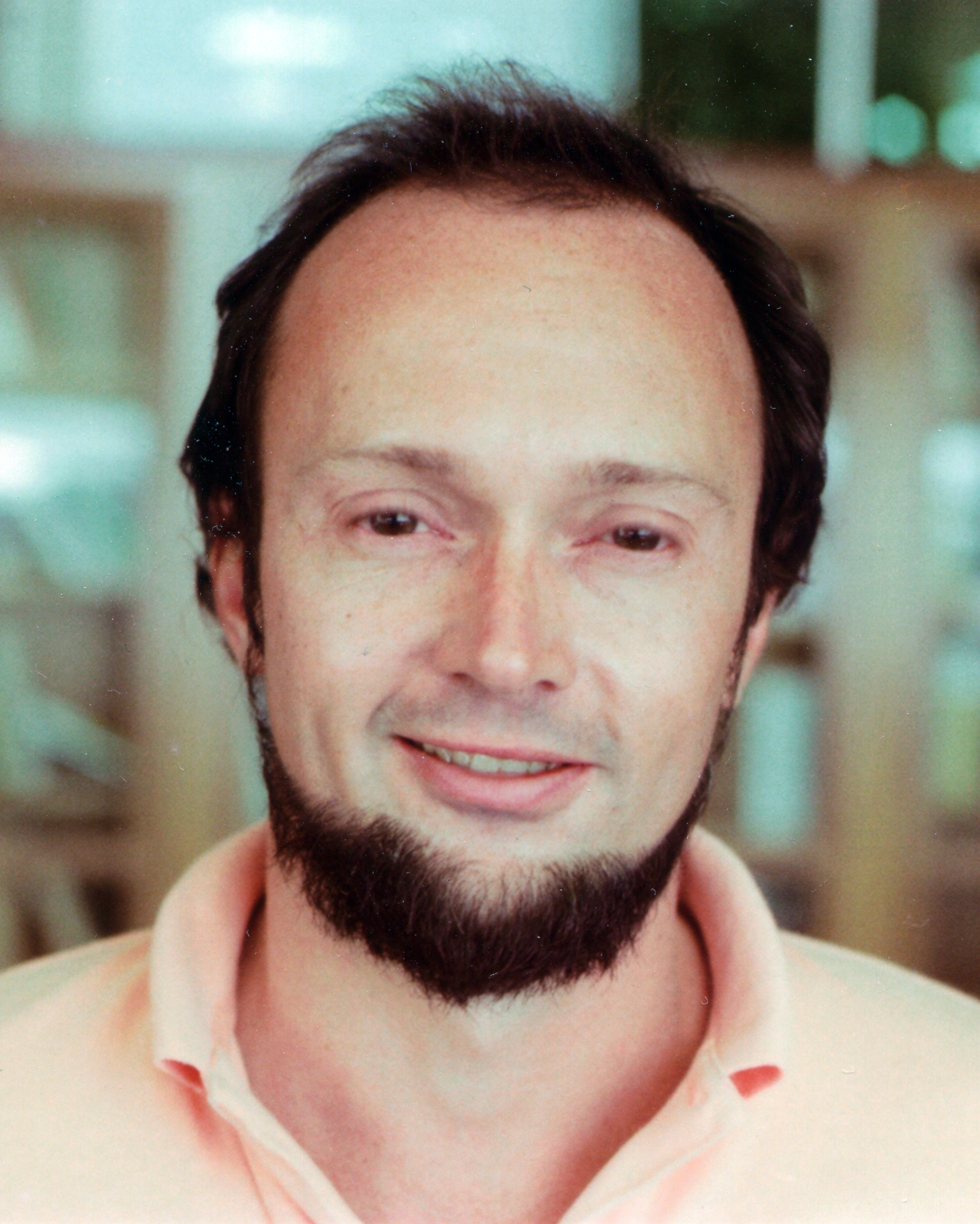
- Hamilton in 1982
- Born: Richard Streit Hamilton; January 10, 1943; Cincinnati, Ohio, U.S.
- Died: September 29, 2024 (aged 81); Manhattan, New York City, U.S.
- Education: Yale University (BA); Princeton University (PhD)
- Known for: Convergence theorems for Ricci flow Dirichlet problem for harmonic maps and harmonic map heat flow Earle–Hamilton fixed-point theorem Gage–Hamilton–Grayson theorem Li–Yau inequalities for Ricci flow and other geometric flows Maximum principle for parabolic systems Nash–Moser theorem Ricci flow with surgery in four dimensions for positive isotropic curvature
- Awards: Veblen Prize (1996); Clay Research Award (2003); Leroy P. Steele Prize (2009); Shaw Prize (2011); Basic Science Lifetime Award in Mathematics (2024)
- Scientific career
- Fields: Mathematics
- Workplaces: Cornell University; University of California, San Diego; Columbia University; University of Hawaiʻi at Mānoa
- Thesis: Variation of Structure on Riemann Surfaces (1966)
- Doctoral advisor: Robert Gunning
- Doctoral students: Martin Lo

Richard Streit Hamilton (January 10, 1943 – September 29, 2024) was an American mathematician who served as the Davies Professor of Mathematics at Columbia University.

Hamilton is known for contributions to geometric analysis and partial differential equations, and particularly for developing the theory of Ricci flow. Hamilton introduced the Ricci flow in 1982 and, over the next decades, he developed a network of results and ideas for using it to prove the Poincaré conjecture and geometrization conjecture from the field of geometric topology.

Hamilton's work on the Ricci flow was recognized with an Oswald Veblen Prize, a Clay Research Award, a Leroy P. Steele Prize for Seminal Contribution to Research and a Shaw Prize. Grigori Perelman built upon Hamilton's research program, proving the Poincaré and geometrization conjectures in 2003. Perelman was awarded a Millennium Prize for resolving the Poincaré conjecture but declined it, regarding his contribution as no greater than Hamilton's.

== Life ==
Hamilton was born in Cincinnati, Ohio, on January 10, 1943. He received his B.A. in 1963 from Yale University and PhD in 1966 from Princeton University. Robert Gunning supervised his thesis.

Hamilton's first permanent position was at Cornell University. There, he interacted with James Eells, who with Joseph Sampson had recently published a paper introducing harmonic map heat flow. Hamilton was inspired to formulate a version of Eells and Sampson's work dealing with deformation of Riemannian metrics. This developed into the Ricci flow. After publishing his first paper on the topic, Hamilton moved to University of California, San Diego in the mid-1980s, joining Richard Schoen and Shing-Tung Yau in the group working on geometric analysis. In 1998, Hamilton became the Davies Professor of Mathematics at Columbia University, where he remained for the rest of his career. In 2022, Hamilton additionally joined University of Hawaiʻi at Mānoa as an adjunct professor.

Hamilton's mathematical contributions are primarily in the field of differential geometry and more specifically geometric analysis. He is best known for having discovered the Ricci flow and developing a research program aimed at the proof of William Thurston's geometrization conjecture, which contains the well-known Poincaré conjecture as a special case. In 2003, Grigori Perelman introduced new ideas into Hamilton's research program and completed a proof of the geometrization conjecture. In March 2010, the Clay Mathematics Institute, having listed the Poincaré conjecture among their Millennium Prize Problems, awarded Perelman with one million USD for his 2003 proof of the conjecture. In July 2010, Perelman turned down the award and prize money, saying that he believed his contribution in proving the Poincaré conjecture was no greater than that of Hamilton.

In 1996, Hamilton was awarded the Oswald Veblen Prize in Geometry "in recognition of his recent and continuing work to uncover the geometric and analytic properties of singularities of the Ricci flow equation and related systems of differential equations." In 2003 he received the Clay Research Award for "his introduction of the Ricci flow equation and his development of it into one of the most powerful tools in geometry and topology". He was elected to the National Academy of Sciences in 1999 and the American Academy of Arts and Sciences in 2003. In 2009, he received the Leroy P. Steele Prize for Seminal Contribution to Research of the American Mathematical Society for his "profoundly original" breakthrough article Three-manifolds with positive Ricci curvature, in which he first introduced and analyzed the Ricci flow.^{[H82b]} In 2011, the million-dollar Shaw Prize was split equally between Hamilton and Demetrios Christodoulou "for their highly innovative works on nonlinear partial differential equations in Lorentzian and Riemannian geometry and their applications to general relativity and topology." In 2024, he and Andrew Wiles received the Basic Science Lifetime Award in Mathematics at the International Congress of Basic Science.

Hamilton died at a hospital in Manhattan, New York City on September 29, 2024, at the age of 81.

== Mathematical work ==
Hamilton was the author of forty-six research articles, the majority of which were in the field of geometric flows.

=== Harnack inequalities for heat equations ===
In 1986, Peter Li and Shing-Tung Yau discovered a new method for applying the maximum principle to control the solutions of the heat equation. Their results take the form of asserting the nonnegativity of certain combinations of partial derivatives of a positive solution of the heat equation. These inequalities, known as differential Harnack inequalities or Li–Yau inequalities, are useful since they can be integrated along paths to compare the values of the solution at any two spacetime points. In 1993, Hamilton showed that the computations of Li and Yau could be extended, showing that their differential Harnack inequality was a consequence of a stronger inequality which asserts the nonnegativity of a matrix-valued function.^{[H93a]} His result required the stronger assumption that the underlying closed Riemannian manifold has nonnegative sectional curvature and parallel Ricci tensor (such as the flat torus or the Fubini–Study metric on complex projective space). Such matrix inequalities are sometimes known as Li–Yau–Hamilton inequalities.

Hamilton also found that Li and Yau's calculations were directly transferable to derive Harnack inequalities for the scalar curvature along a positively-curved Ricci flow on a two-dimensional closed manifold.^{[H88]} With more effort, he was able to formulate an analogue of his matrix estimate in the case of the Riemann curvature tensor along a Ricci flow in general dimensions, provided that the curvature operator is nonnegative.^{[H93b]} As an important algebraic corollary, the values of the scalar curvature at two different spacetime points can be compared. This fact is used extensively in Hamilton and Perelman's further study of Ricci flow.

Hamilton later adapted his Li–Yau estimate for the Ricci flow to the setting of the mean curvature flow, which is slightly simpler since the geometry is governed by the second fundamental form, which has a simpler structure than the Riemann curvature tensor.^{[H95c]} Hamilton's theorem, which requires strict convexity, is naturally applicable to certain singularities of mean curvature flow due to the convexity estimates of Gerhard Huisken and Carlo Sinestrari.

=== Nash–Moser theorem ===
In 1956, John Nash resolved the problem of smoothly isometrically embedding Riemannian manifolds in Euclidean space. The core of his proof was a novel "small perturbation" result, showing that if a Riemannian metric could be isometrically embedded in a certain way, then any nearby Riemannian metric could be isometrically embedded as well. Such a result is highly reminiscent of an implicit function theorem, and many authors have attempted to put the logic of the proof into the setting of a general theorem. Such theorems are now known as Nash–Moser theorems.

In 1982, Hamilton published his formulation of Nash's reasoning, casting the theorem into the setting of tame Fréchet spaces; Nash's fundamental use of restricting the Fourier transform to regularize functions was abstracted by Hamilton to the setting of exponentially decreasing sequences in Banach spaces.^{[H82a]} His formulation has been widely quoted and used in the subsequent time. He used it himself to prove a general existence and uniqueness theorem for geometric evolution equations; the standard implicit function theorem does not often apply in such settings due to the degeneracies introduced by invariance under the action of the diffeomorphism group.^{[H82b]} In particular, the well-posedness of the Ricci flow follows from Hamilton's general result. Although Dennis DeTurck gave a simpler proof in the particular case of the Ricci flow, Hamilton's result has been used for some other geometric flows which are inaccessible to DeTurck's method.

=== Harmonic map heat flow ===
In 1964, James Eells and Joseph Sampson initiated the study of harmonic map heat flow, using a convergence theorem for the flow to show that any smooth map from a closed manifold to a closed manifold of nonpositive curvature can be deformed to a harmonic map. In 1975, Hamilton considered the corresponding boundary value problem for this flow, proving an analogous result to Eells and Sampson's for the Dirichlet condition and Neumann condition.^{[H75]} The analytic nature of the problem is more delicate in this setting, since Eells and Sampson's key application of the maximum principle to the parabolic Bochner formula cannot be trivially carried out, due to the fact that size of the gradient at the boundary is not automatically controlled by the boundary conditions.

By a limiting procedure, Richard Schoen and Shing-Tung Yau used Hamilton's theorem to prove that any finite-energy map from a complete Riemannian manifold to a closed Riemannian manifold of nonpositive curvature can be deformed into a finite-energy harmonic map. With the use of such maps, they were able to derive a number of purely geometric corollaries, such as restrictions on the topology of precompact open subsets with simply-connected boundary inside complete Riemannian manifolds of nonnegative Ricci curvature.

=== Mean curvature flow ===
In 1986, Hamilton and Michael Gage applied Hamilton's Nash–Moser theorem and well-posedness result for parabolic equations to prove the well-posedness for mean curvature flow; they considered the general case of a one-parameter family of immersions of a closed manifold into a smooth Riemannian manifold.^{[GH86]} Then, they specialized to the case of immersions of the circle into the Euclidean plane, which is the simplest context for curve shortening flow. Using the maximum principle as applied to the distance between two points on a curve, they proved that if the initial immersion is an embedding, then all future immersions in the mean curvature flow are embeddings as well. Furthermore, convexity of the curves is preserved into the future.

Gage and Hamilton's main result is that, given any smoothly embedded circle in the plane which is convex, the corresponding mean curvature flow exists for a finite amount of time, and as the time approaches its maximal value, the curves asymptotically become increasingly small and circular.^{[GH86]} They made use of previous results of Gage, as well as a few special results for curves, such as Bonnesen's inequality.

In 1987, Matthew Grayson proved a complementary result, showing that for any smoothly embedded circle in the plane, the corresponding mean curvature flow eventually becomes convex. In combination with Gage and Hamilton's result, one has essentially a complete description of the asymptotic behavior of the mean curvature flow of embedded circles in the plane. This result, sometimes known as the Gage–Hamilton–Grayson theorem, says that the curve shortening flow gives systematic and geometrically defined means of deforming an arbitrary embedded circle in the Euclidean plane into a round circle.

The modern understanding of the results of Gage–Hamilton and of Grayson usually treat both settings at once, without the need for showing that arbitrary curves become convex and separately studying the behavior of convex curves. Their results can also be extended to settings other than the mean curvature flow.

=== Ricci flow ===
Hamilton extended the maximum principle for parabolic partial differential equations to the setting of symmetric 2-tensors which satisfy a parabolic partial differential equation.^{[H82b]} He also put this into the general setting of a parameter-dependent section of a vector bundle over a closed manifold which satisfies a heat equation, giving both strong and weak formulations.^{[H86]}

Partly due to these foundational technical developments, Hamilton was able to give an essentially complete understanding of how Ricci flow deforms closed Riemannian manifolds which are three-dimensional with positive Ricci curvature^{[H82b]} or nonnegative Ricci curvature^{[H86]}, four-dimensional with positive or nonnegative curvature operator^{[H86]}, and two-dimensional of nonpositive Euler characteristic or of positive curvature^{[H88]}. In each case, after appropriate normalizations, the Ricci flow deforms the given Riemannian metric to one of constant curvature. This has immediate corollaries of high significance in differential geometry, such as the fact that any closed smooth 3-manifold which admits a Riemannian metric of positive curvature also admits a Riemannian metric of constant positive sectional curvature. Such results are notable in highly restricting the topology of such manifolds; the space forms of positive curvature are largely understood. There are other corollaries, such as the fact that the topological space of Riemannian metrics of positive Ricci curvature on a closed smooth 3-manifold is path-connected. Among other later developments, these convergence theorems of Hamilton were extended by Simon Brendle and Richard Schoen in 2009 to give a proof of the differentiable sphere theorem, which had been a major conjecture in Riemannian geometry since the 1960s.

In 1995, Hamilton extended Jeff Cheeger's compactness theory for Riemannian manifolds to give a compactness theorem for sequences of Ricci flows.^{[H95a]} Given a Ricci flow on a closed manifold with a finite-time singularity, Hamilton developed methods of rescaling around the singularity to produce a sequence of Ricci flows; the compactness theory ensures the existence of a limiting Ricci flow, which models the small-scale geometry of a Ricci flow around a singular point.^{[H95b]} Hamilton used his maximum principles to prove that, for any Ricci flow on a closed three-dimensional manifold, the smallest value of the sectional curvature is small compared to its largest value. This is known as the Hamilton–Ivey estimate; it is extremely significant as a curvature inequality which holds with no conditional assumptions beyond three-dimensionality. An important consequence is that, in three dimensions, a limiting Ricci flow as produced by the compactness theory automatically has nonnegative curvature.^{[H95b]} As such, Hamilton's Harnack inequality is applicable to the limiting Ricci flow. These methods were extended by Grigori Perelman, who due to his noncollapsing theorem was able to verify the preconditions of Hamilton's compactness theory in a number of new contexts.

In 1997, Hamilton was able to combine his developed methods to define Ricci flow with surgery for four-dimensional Riemannian manifolds of positive isotropic curvature.^{[H97]} For Ricci flows with initial data in this class, he was able to classify the possibilities for the small-scale geometry around points with large curvature, and hence to systematically modify the geometry so as to continue the Ricci flow past times where curvature accumulates indefinitely. As a consequence, he obtained a result which classifies the smooth four-dimensional manifolds which support Riemannian metrics of positive isotropic curvature. Shing-Tung Yau has described this article as the "most important event" in geometric analysis in the period after 1993, marking it as the point at which it became clear that it could be possible to prove Thurston's geometrization conjecture by Ricci flow methods. The essential outstanding issue was to carry out an analogous classification, for the small-scale geometry around high-curvature points on Ricci flows on three-dimensional manifolds, without any curvature restriction; the Hamilton–Ivey curvature estimate is the analogue to the condition of positive isotropic curvature. This was resolved by Grigori Perelman in his renowned canonical neighborhoods theorem. Building off of this result, Perelman modified the form of Hamilton's surgery procedure to define a Ricci flow with surgery given an arbitrary smooth Riemannian metric on a closed three-dimensional manifold. Using this as the core analytical tool, Perelman resolved the geometrization conjecture, which contains the well-known Poincaré conjecture as a special case.

=== Other work ===
In one of his earliest works, Hamilton proved the Earle–Hamilton fixed point theorem in collaboration with Clifford Earle.^{[EH70]} In unpublished lecture notes from the 1980s, Hamilton introduced the Yamabe flow and proved its long-time existence. In collaboration with Shiing-Shen Chern, Hamilton studied certain variational problems for Riemannian metrics in contact geometry. He also made contributions to the prescribed Ricci curvature problem.

== Major publications ==
EH70.	Earle, Clifford J.; Hamilton, Richard S. (1970). "A fixed point theorem for holomorphic mappings". In Chern, Shiing-Shen; Smale, Stephen (eds.). Global analysis. American Mathematical Society summer institute held at the University of California (Berkeley, CA) July 1–26, 1968. Proceedings of Symposia in Pure Mathematics. Vol. 16. Providence, RI: American Mathematical Society. pp. 61–65. doi:10.1090/pspum/016. ISBN 9780821814161. MR 0266009. Zbl 0205.14702.

H75.	Hamilton, Richard S. (1975). Harmonic Maps of Manifolds with Boundary. Lecture Notes in Mathematics. Vol. 471. Berlin–New York: Springer-Verlag. doi:10.1007/BFb0087227. ISBN 978-3-540-07185-3. MR 0482822. Zbl 0308.35003.

H82a.	Hamilton, Richard S. (1982). "The inverse function theorem of Nash and Moser". Bulletin of the American Mathematical Society. New Series. 7 (1): 65–222. doi:10.1090/s0273-0979-1982-15004-2. MR 0656198. Zbl 0499.58003.

H82b.	Hamilton, Richard S. (1982). "Three-manifolds with positive Ricci curvature". Journal of Differential Geometry. 17 (2): 255–306. Reprinted in Cao et al. (2003). doi:10.4310/jdg/1214436922. MR 0664497. Zbl 0504.53034. Hamilton, Richard S. (2003). "Three-orbifolds with positive Ricci curvature". In Cao, H. D.; Chow, B.; Chu, S. C.; Yau, S. T. (eds.). Collected papers on Ricci flow. Series in Geometry and Topology. Vol. 37. Somerville, MA: International Press. pp. 521–524. ISBN 1-57146-110-8. MR 2143256.

GH86.	Gage, M.; Hamilton, R. S. (1986). "The heat equation shrinking convex plane curves". Journal of Differential Geometry. 23 (1): 69–96. doi:10.4310/jdg/1214439902. MR 0840401. Zbl 0621.53001.

H86.	Hamilton, Richard S. (1986). "Four-manifolds with positive curvature operator". Journal of Differential Geometry. 24 (2): 153–179. Reprinted in Cao et al. (2003). doi:10.4310/jdg/1214440433. MR 0862046. Zbl 0628.53042.

H88.	Hamilton, Richard S. (1988). "The Ricci flow on surfaces". In Isenberg, James A. (ed.). Mathematics and general relativity: proceedings of a summer research conference held June 22−28, 1986. Contemporary Mathematics. Vol. 71. Providence, RI: American Mathematical Society. pp. 237–262. Reprinted in Cao et al. (2003). doi:10.1090/conm/071. ISBN 9780821850794. MR 0954419. Zbl 0663.53031.

H93a.	Hamilton, Richard S. (1993). "A matrix Harnack estimate for the heat equation". Communications in Analysis and Geometry. 1 (1): 113–126. doi:10.4310/CAG.1993.v1.n1.a6. MR 1230276. Zbl 0799.53048.

H93b.	Hamilton, Richard S. (1993). "The Harnack estimate for the Ricci flow". Journal of Differential Geometry. 37 (1): 225–243. Reprinted in Cao et al. (2003). doi:10.4310/jdg/1214453430. MR 1198607. Zbl 0804.53023.

H95a.	Hamilton, Richard S. (1995). "A compactness property for solutions of the Ricci flow". American Journal of Mathematics. 117 (3): 545–572. Reprinted in Cao et al. (2003). doi:10.2307/2375080. JSTOR 2375080. MR 1333936. Zbl 0840.53029.

H95b.	Hamilton, Richard S. (1995). "The formation of singularities in the Ricci flow". In Hsiung, C.-C.; Yau, S.-T. (eds.). Proceedings of the conference on geometry and topology held at Harvard University, April 23–25, 1993. Surveys in Differential Geometry. Vol. II. Cambridge, MA: International Press. pp. 7–136. Reprinted in Cao et al. (2003). doi:10.4310/SDG.1993.v2.n1.a2. MR 1375255. Zbl 0867.53030.

H95c.	Hamilton, Richard S. (1995). "Harnack estimate for the mean curvature flow". Journal of Differential Geometry. 41 (1): 215–226. doi:10.4310/jdg/1214456010. MR 1316556. Zbl 0827.53006.

H97.	Hamilton, Richard S. (1997). "Four-manifolds with positive isotropic curvature". Communications in Analysis and Geometry. 5 (1): 1–92. Reprinted in Cao et al. (2003). doi:10.4310/CAG.1997.v5.n1.a1. MR 1456308. Zbl 0892.53018.

H99.	Hamilton, Richard S. (1999). "Non-singular solutions of the Ricci flow on three-manifolds". Communications in Analysis and Geometry. 7 (4): 695–729. Reprinted in Cao et al. (2003). doi:10.4310/CAG.1999.v7.n4.a2. MR 1714939. Zbl 0939.53024.

The collection

- Cao, H. D.; Chow, B.; Chu, S. C.; Yau, S. T., eds. (2003). Collected papers on Ricci flow. Series in Geometry and Topology. Vol. 37. Somerville, MA: International Press. ISBN 1-57146-110-8. MR 2145154. Zbl 1108.53002.

contains twelve of Hamilton's articles on Ricci flow, in addition to ten related articles by other authors.
