= Joseph H. Sampson =

American mathematician (1926–2003)

- Born: 1926
- Died: 2003 (aged 76–77)
- Education: Princeton University
- Known for: Introduction of harmonic maps
- Scientific career
- Fields: Mathematics
- Thesis: The Dirichlet Problem in the Large (1951)
- Doctoral advisors: Salomon Bochner

Joseph Harold Sampson Jr. (1926–2003) was an American mathematician known for his work in mathematical analysis, geometry and topology, especially his work about harmonic maps in collaboration with James Eells. He obtained his Ph.D. in mathematics from Princeton University in 1951 under the supervision of Salomon Bochner.

== Mathematical work ==
In 1964, Sampson and James Eells introduced harmonic maps, which are mappings between Riemannian manifolds which solve a geometrically defined system of partial differential equations. They can also be defined via the calculus of variations. Generalizing Bochner's work on harmonic functions, Eells and Sampson derived the Bochner identity, and used it to prove the triviality of harmonic maps under certain curvature conditions.

Eells and Sampson established the existence of harmonic maps whenever the domain manifold is closed and the target has non-positive sectional curvature. Their proof analyzed the harmonic map heat flow, which is a geometrically defined heat equation. By establishing a priori estimates for the flow, they were able to prove its convergence under the indicated curvature assumption. The use of the Bochner identity in deriving estimates is where the assumption on sectional curvature plays a crucial role. As a result of Eells and Sampson's (subsequential) convergence theorem, they were able to prove the existence of harmonic maps in any homotopy class. As such, harmonic maps may be regarded as canonically defined representatives of topological spaces of mappings. This perspective has enabled the application of harmonic maps to many problems in geometry and topology.

Eells and Sampson's work is one of the most prominent papers in the field of differential geometry, and was a direct inspiration for Richard Hamilton's epochal work on the Ricci flow. In addition to Eells and Sampson's heat flow, their main results on existence of harmonic maps can also be derived via the calculus of variations, using the regularity theory developed in the 1980s by Richard Schoen and Karen Uhlenbeck.

Later in 1978, Sampson developed unique continuation, maximum principles, further rigidity theorems, and deformability results for harmonic maps. He also proved that a harmonic map of degree one between compact hyperbolic Riemann surfaces must be a diffeomorphism. The same result was obtained at the same time by Schoen and Shing-Tung Yau.

== Major publications ==
Over the course of forty years, Sampson published around twenty research articles.

- Eells, James Jr.; Sampson, J. H. (1964). "Harmonic mappings of Riemannian manifolds". American Journal of Mathematics. 86 (1): 109–160. doi:10.2307/2373037. JSTOR 2373037. MR 0164306. Zbl 0122.40102.
- Sampson, J. H. (1978). "Some properties and applications of harmonic mappings". Annales Scientifiques de l'École Normale Supérieure. Quatrième Série. 11 (2): 211–228. doi:10.24033/asens.1344. MR 0510549. Zbl 0392.31009.
