= Biharmonic map =

In the mathematical field of differential geometry, a biharmonic map is a map between Riemannian or pseudo-Riemannian manifolds which satisfies a certain fourth-order partial differential equation. A biharmonic submanifold refers to an embedding or immersion into a Riemannian or pseudo-Riemannian manifold which is a biharmonic map when the domain is equipped with its induced metric. The problem of understanding biharmonic maps was posed by James Eells and Luc Lemaire in 1983. The study of harmonic maps, of which the study of biharmonic maps is an outgrowth (any harmonic map is also a biharmonic map), had been (and remains) an active field of study for the previous twenty years. A simple case of biharmonic maps is given by biharmonic functions.

== Definition ==
Given Riemannian or pseudo-Riemannian manifolds (M, g) and (N, h), a map f from M to N which is differentiable at least four times is called a biharmonic map if
$$\Delta\Delta f+\sum_{i=1}^m R^h\big(\Delta f,df(e_i),df(e_i)\big)=0;$$
given any point p of M, each side of this equation is an element of the tangent space to N at f(p). In other words, the above equation is an equality of sections of the vector bundle f^{*}TN → M. In the equation, e_{1}, ..., e_{m} is an arbitrary g-orthonormal basis of the tangent space to M and R^{h} is the Riemann curvature tensor, following the convention R(u, v, w) = ∇_{u}∇_{v}w − ∇_{v}∇_{u}w − ∇_{[u, v]}w. The quantity ∆f is the "tension field" or "Laplacian" of f, as was introduced by Eells and Sampson in the study of harmonic maps.

In terms of the trace, interior product, and pullback operations, the biharmonic map equation can be written as
$$\Delta\Delta f+\operatorname{tr}_g\Big(f^\ast\big(\iota_{\Delta f}R^h\big)\Big)=0.$$
In terms of local coordinates x^{i} for M and local coordinates y^{α} for N, the biharmonic map equation is written as
$$g^{ij} \left(
\frac{\partial}{\partial x^i} \left(\frac{\partial(\Delta f)^\alpha}{\partial x^j}+\frac{\partial f^\beta}{\partial x^j}\Gamma_{\beta\gamma}^\alpha(\Delta f)^\gamma\right)
-
\Gamma_{ij}^k \left(\frac{\partial(\Delta f)^\alpha}{\partial x^k}+\frac{\partial f^\beta}{\partial x^k}\Gamma_{\beta\gamma}^\alpha(\Delta f)^\gamma\right)
+
\frac{\partial f^\delta}{\partial x^i} \Gamma_{\delta\epsilon}^\alpha\left(\frac{\partial(\Delta f)^\epsilon}{\partial x^j}+\frac{\partial f^\beta}{\partial x^j}\Gamma_{\beta\gamma}^\epsilon(\Delta f)^\gamma\right)
\right)
+ g^{ij} R_{\beta\gamma\delta}^\alpha (\Delta f)^\beta\frac{\partial f^\gamma}{\partial x^i}\frac{\partial f^\delta}{\partial x^j}
= 0,$$
in which the Einstein summation convention is used with the following definitions of the Christoffel symbols, Riemann curvature tensor, and tension field:
$$\begin{align}
\Gamma_{ij}^k &= \frac{1}{2}g^{kl}\left(\frac{\partial g_{jl}}{\partial x^i}+\frac{\partial g_{il}}{\partial x^j}-\frac{\partial g_{ij}}{\partial x^l}\right) \\
\Gamma_{\beta\gamma}^\alpha &= \frac{1}{2}h^{\alpha\delta} \left(\frac{\partial h_{\gamma\delta}}{\partial y^\beta}+\frac{\partial h_{\beta\delta}}{\partial y^\gamma} - \frac{\partial h_{\beta\gamma}}{\partial y^\delta}\right) \\
R_{\beta\gamma\delta}^\alpha &= \frac{\partial\Gamma_{\gamma\delta}^\alpha}{\partial y^\beta}-\frac{\partial\Gamma_{\beta\delta}^\alpha}{\partial y^\gamma}+\Gamma_{\beta\rho}^\alpha\Gamma_{\gamma\delta}^\rho-\Gamma_{\gamma\rho}^\alpha\Gamma_{\beta\delta}^\rho\\
\left(\Delta f\right)^\alpha &= g^{ij} \left(\frac{\partial^2f^\alpha}{\partial x^i\partial x^j}-\Gamma_{ij}^k\frac{\partial f^\alpha}{\partial x^k}+\frac{\partial f^\beta}{\partial x^i}\Gamma_{\beta\gamma}^\alpha\frac{\partial f^\gamma}{\partial x^j}\right).
\end{align}$$
It is clear from any of these presentations of the equation that any harmonic map is automatically biharmonic. For this reason, a proper biharmonic map refers to a biharmonic map which is not harmonic.

In the special setting where f is a (pseudo-)Riemannian immersion, meaning that it is an immersion and that g is equal to the induced metric f^{*}h, one says that one has a biharmonic submanifold instead of a biharmonic map. Since the mean curvature vector of f is equal to the laplacian of f : (M, f^{*}h) → (N, h), one knows that an immersion is minimal if and only if it is harmonic. In particular, any minimal immersion is automatically a biharmonic submanifold. A proper biharmonic submanifold refers to a biharmonic submanifold which is not minimal.

The motivation for the biharmonic map equation is from the bienergy functional
$$E_2(f) = \frac{1}{2} \, \int_M \left|\Delta f\right|_h^2 \, dv_g,$$
in the setting where M is closed and g and h are both Riemannian; dv_{g} denotes the volume measure on $M$ induced by g. Eells & Lemaire, in 1983, suggested the study of critical points of this functional. Guo Ying Jiang, in 1986, calculated its first variation formula, thereby finding the above biharmonic map equation as the corresponding Euler–Lagrange equation. Harmonic maps correspond to critical points for which the bioenergy functional takes on its minimal possible value of zero.

== Examples and classification ==
A number of examples of biharmonic maps, such as inverses of stereographic projections in the special case of four dimensions, and inversions of punctured Euclidean space, are known. There are many examples of biharmonic submanifolds, such as (for any k) the generalized Clifford torus
$$\left\{x\in\mathbb{R}^{n+2}:x_1^2+\cdots+x_{k+1}^2=x_{k+2}^2+\cdots+x_{n+2}^2 = \frac{1}{2}\right\},$$
as a submanifold of the (n + 1)-sphere. It is minimal if and only if n is even and equal to 2k.

The biharmonic curves in three-dimensional space forms can be studied via the Frenet equations. It follows easily that every constant-speed biharmonic curve in a three-dimensional space form of nonpositive curvature must be geodesic. Any constant-speed biharmonic curves in the round three-dimensional sphere S^{3} can be viewed as the solution of a certain constant-coefficient fourth-order linear ordinary differential equation for a R^{4}-valued function. As such the situation can be completely analyzed, with the result that any such curve is, up to an isometry of the sphere:

- a constant-speed parametrization of the intersection of S^{3} ⊂ R^{4} with the two-dimensional linear subspace R × R × {0} × {0}
- a constant-speed parametrization of the intersection of S^{3} ⊂ R^{4} with the two-dimensional affine subspace R × R × {d_{1}} × {d_{2}}, for any choice of (d_{1}, d_{2}) which is on the circle of radius 2^{−1/2} around the origin in R^{2}
- a constant-speed reparametrization of
  $$t\mapsto \Big(\frac{\cos at}{\sqrt{2}},\frac{\sin at}{\sqrt{2}},\frac{\cos bt}{\sqrt{2}},\frac{\sin bt}{\sqrt{2}}\Big)$$
  for any (a, b) on the circle of radius 2^{1/2} around the origin in R^{2}.

In particular, every constant-speed biharmonic curve in S^{3} has constant geodesic curvature.

As a consequence of the purely local study of the Gauss-Codazzi equations and the biharmonic map equation, any connected biharmonic surface in S^{3} must have constant mean curvature. If it is nonzero (so that the surface is not minimal) then the second fundamental form must have constant length equal to 2^{1/2}, as follows from the biharmonic map equation. Surfaces with such strong geometric conditions can be completely classified, with the result that any connected biharmonic surface in S^{3} must be either locally (up to isometry) part of the hypersphere
$$\left\{\Big((w,x,y,\frac{1}{\sqrt{2}}\Big):w^2+x^2+y^2=\frac{1}{2}\right\},$$
or minimal. In a similar way, any biharmonic hypersurface of Euclidean space which has constant mean curvature must be minimal.

Guo Ying Jiang showed that if g and h are Riemannian, and if M is closed and h has nonpositive sectional curvature, then a map from (M, g) to (N, h) is biharmonic if and only if it is harmonic. The proof is to show that, due to the sectional curvature assumption, the Laplacian of |∆f|^{2} is nonnegative, at which point the maximum principle applies. This result and proof can be compared to Eells & Sampson's vanishing theorem, which says that if additionally the Ricci curvature of g is nonnegative, then a map from (M, g) to (N, h) is harmonic if and only if it is totally geodesic. As a special case of Jiang's result, a closed submanifold of a Riemannian manifold of nonpositive sectional curvature is biharmonic if and only if it is minimal. Partly based on these results, it was conjectured by R. Caddeo, S. Montaldo and C. Oniciuc that every biharmonic submanifold of a Riemannian manifold of nonpositive sectional curvature must be minimal. This, however, is now known to be false. The special case of submanifolds of Euclidean space is an older conjecture of Bang-Yen Chen. Chen's conjecture has been proven in a number of geometrically special cases.

== See also ==
- Bi-Yang–Mills equations, non-linear generalization
