= Sigmundur =

Sigmundur is a given name. Notable people with the name include:

- Sigmundur Brestisson (961–1005), Faroese Viking chieftain, took Christianity to the Faroe Islands in 999
- Sigmundur Gudmundsson (born 1960), Icelandic-Swedish mathematician at Lund University
- Sigmundur Davíð Gunnlaugsson (born 1975), Icelandic politician, prime minister of Iceland (2013–2016)
- Sigmundur Már Herbertsson (born 1968), Icelandic basketball referee and former player
- Sigmundur Ernir Rúnarsson (born 1961), member of parliament of the Althing, the Icelandic parliament

== See also ==
- Sigmund
