= John C. Wood =

British mathematician (born 1949)

Professor John C. Wood (born 1949) is a British mathematician working at the University of Leeds. He is one of the leading experts on harmonic maps and harmonic morphisms in the field of differential geometry.

Wood is a coauthor of the monograph: Harmonic Morphisms Between Riemannian Manifolds. This was published in 2003 and is still the standard text on the subject.

Wood earned his PhD from the University of Warwick in 1974, under the supervision of James Eells. His doctoral students have included Sigmundur Gudmundsson and Stefano Montaldo.

== Plagiarism ==
Wood was at the centre of a plagiarism row with another of his former PhD students in 2011.

== Publications ==
- with Paul Baird: Harmonic Morphisms between Riemannian Manifolds, London Math. Society Monographs (N.S.), No. 29, Oxford University Press (2003)
- Profile at Zentralblatt MATH
