= Andreotti–Norguet formula =

The Andreotti–Norguet formula, first introduced by Aldo Andreotti and François Norguet (1964, 1966), is a higher–dimensional analogue of Cauchy integral formula for expressing the derivatives of a holomorphic function. Precisely, this formula express the value of the partial derivative of any multiindex order of a holomorphic function of several variables, in any interior point of a given bounded domain, as a hypersurface integral of the values of the function on the boundary of the domain itself. In this respect, it is analogous and generalizes the Bochner–Martinelli formula, reducing to it when the absolute value of the multiindex order of differentiation is 0. When considered for functions of n = 1 complex variables, it reduces to the ordinary Cauchy formula for the derivative of a holomorphic function: however, when n > 1, its integral kernel is not obtainable by simple differentiation of the Bochner–Martinelli kernel.

== Historical note ==
The Andreotti–Norguet formula was first published in the research announcement (Andreotti & Norguet 1964, p. 780): however, its full proof was only published later in the paper (Andreotti & Norguet 1966, pp. 207–208). Another, different proof of the formula was given by Martinelli (1975). In 1977 and 1978, Lev Aizenberg gave still another proof and a generalization of the formula based on the Cauchy–Fantappiè–Leray kernel instead on the Bochner–Martinelli kernel.

== The Andreotti–Norguet integral representation formula ==
=== Notation ===
The notation adopted in the following description of the integral representation formula is the one used by Kytmanov (1995, p. 9) and by Kytmanov & Myslivets (2010, p. 20): the notations used in the original works and in other references, though equivalent, are significantly different. Precisely, it is assumed that

- n > 1 is a fixed natural number,
- $\zeta, z \in \Complex^n$ are complex vectors,
- $\alpha = (\alpha_1, \dots, \alpha_n) \in \mathbb{N}^n$ is a multiindex whose absolute value is |α|,
- $D \subset \Complex^n$ is a bounded domain whose closure is D̅,
- A(D) is the function space of functions holomorphic on the interior of D and continuous on its boundary ∂D.
- the iterated Wirtinger derivatives of order α of a given complex valued function f ∈ A(D) are expressed using the following simplified notation:
  $$\partial^\alpha f = \frac{\partial^{|\alpha|} f}{\partial z_1^{\alpha_1} \cdots \partial z_n^{\alpha_n}}.$$

=== The Andreotti–Norguet kernel ===
Definition 1. For every multiindex α, the Andreotti–Norguet kernel ω_{α} (ζ, z) is the following differential form in ζ of bidegree (n, n − 1):
$$\omega_\alpha(\zeta,z) = \frac{(n-1)!\alpha_1!\cdots\alpha_n!}{(2\pi i)^n}
\sum_{j=1}^n \frac{(-1)^{j-1}(\bar\zeta_j-\overline z_j)^{\alpha_j+1} \, d\bar\zeta^{\alpha+I}[j] \land d\zeta}{\left(|z_1-\zeta_1|^{2(\alpha_1+1)} + \cdots + |z_n-\zeta_n|^{2(\alpha_n+1)}\right)^n},$$
where $I = (1, \dots, 1) \in \N^n$ and
$$d\bar\zeta^{\alpha+I}[j] =  d\bar\zeta_1^{\alpha_1+1} \land \cdots \land d\bar\zeta_{j-1}^{\alpha_{j+1}+1} \land d\bar\zeta_{j+1}^{\alpha_{j-1}+1} \land \cdots \land d\bar\zeta_n^{\alpha_n+1}$$

=== The integral formula ===
Theorem 1 (Andreotti and Norguet). For every function f ∈ A(D), every point z ∈ D and every multiindex α, the following integral representation formula holds
$$\partial^\alpha f(z) = \int_{\partial D} f(\zeta)\omega_\alpha(\zeta,z).$$

== See also ==
- Bergman–Weil formula
