= Sigmundur Gudmundsson =

Icelandic-Swedish mathematician (born 1960)

Sigmundur Gudmundsson (Icelandic pronunciation: [ˈsɪkmʏntʏr̥ ˈkvʏðmʏntsˌsɔːn]; born 1960) is an Icelandic-Swedish mathematician working at Lund University in the fields of differential geometry and global analysis. He is mainly interested in the geometric aspects of harmonic maps and their derivatives, such as harmonic morphisms and p-harmonic functions. His work is partially devoted to the existence theory of complex-valued harmonic morphisms and p-harmonic functions from Riemannian homogeneous spaces of various types, such as symmetric spaces and semisimple, solvable and nilpotent Lie groups.

Gudmundsson earned his Ph.D. from the University of Leeds in 1992, under the supervision of John C. Wood.

Gudmundsson is the founder of the website Nordic-Math-Job advertising vacant academic positions in the Nordic university departments of Mathematics and Statistics. This started off in 1997 as a one-man show, but is now supported by the mathematical societies in the Nordic countries and the National Committee for Mathematics of The Royal Swedish Academy of Sciences.

== Publications ==
- An Introduction to Gaussian Geometry, Lund University (2025).
- An Introduction to Riemannian Geometry, Lund University (2025).
- Research Papers
