= Bochner's theorem (Riemannian geometry) =

Isometry group of a compact Riemannian manifold with negative Ricci curvature is finite

In mathematics, Salomon Bochner proved in 1946 that any Killing vector field of a compact Riemannian manifold with negative Ricci curvature must be zero. Consequently the isometry group of the manifold must be finite.

== Discussion ==
The theorem is a corollary of Bochner's more fundamental result which says that on any connected Riemannian manifold of negative Ricci curvature, the length of a nonzero Killing vector field cannot have a local maximum. In particular, on a closed Riemannian manifold of negative Ricci curvature, every Killing vector field is identically zero. Since the isometry group of a complete Riemannian manifold is a Lie group whose Lie algebra is naturally identified with the vector space of Killing vector fields, it follows that the isometry group is zero-dimensional. Bochner's theorem then follows from the fact that the isometry group of a closed Riemannian manifold is compact.

Bochner's result on Killing vector fields is an application of the maximum principle as follows. As an application of the Ricci commutation identities, the formula

$$\Delta X=-\nabla(\operatorname{div}X)+\operatorname{div}(\mathcal{L}_Xg)-\operatorname{Ric}(X,\cdot)$$

holds for any vector field X on a pseudo-Riemannian manifold. As a consequence, there is

$$\frac{1}{2}\Delta\langle X,X\rangle=\langle\nabla X,\nabla X\rangle-\nabla_X\operatorname{div}X+\langle X,\operatorname{div}(\mathcal{L}_Xg)\rangle-\operatorname{Ric}(X,X).$$

In the case that X is a Killing vector field, this simplifies to

$$\frac{1}{2}\Delta\langle X,X\rangle=\langle\nabla X,\nabla X\rangle-\operatorname{Ric}(X,X).$$

In the case of a Riemannian metric, the left-hand side is nonpositive at any local maximum of the length of X. However, on a Riemannian metric of negative Ricci curvature, the right-hand side is strictly positive wherever X is nonzero. So if X has a local maximum, then it must be identically zero in a neighborhood. Since Killing vector fields on connected manifolds are uniquely determined from their value and derivative at a single point, it follows that X must be identically zero.
