= Ricci soliton =

Concept in differential geometry

In differential geometry, a complete Riemannian manifold $(M,g)$ is called a Ricci soliton if, and only if, there exists a smooth vector field $V$ such that

$$\operatorname{Ric}(g) = \lambda \, g - \frac{1}{2} \mathcal{L}_V g,$$

for some constant $\lambda \in \mathbb{R}$. Here $\operatorname{Ric}$ is the Ricci curvature tensor and $\mathcal{L}$ represents the Lie derivative. If there exists a function $f: M \rightarrow \mathbb{R}$ such that $V = \nabla f$ we call $(M,g)$ a gradient Ricci soliton and the soliton equation becomes

$$\operatorname{Ric}(g) + \nabla^2 f= \lambda \, g.$$

Note that when $V = 0$ or $f = 0$ the above equations reduce to the Einstein equation. For this reason Ricci solitons are a generalization of Einstein manifolds.

== Self-similar solutions to Ricci flow ==
A Ricci soliton $(M,g_0)$ yields a self-similar solution to the Ricci flow equation

$$\partial_t g_t = -2 \operatorname{Ric}(g_t).$$

In particular, letting

$$\sigma(t) := 1 - 2 \lambda t$$

and integrating the time-dependent vector field $X(t) := \frac{1}{\sigma(t)} V$ to give a family of diffeomorphisms $\Psi_t$, with $\Psi_0$ the identity, yields a Ricci flow solution $(M, g_t)$ by taking

$$g_t = \sigma(t) \Psi^\ast_t(g_0).$$

In this expression $\Psi^\ast_t(g_0)$ refers to the pullback of the metric $g_0$ by the diffeomorphism $\Psi_t$. Therefore, up to diffeomorphism and depending on the sign of $\lambda$, a Ricci soliton homothetically shrinks, remains steady or expands under Ricci flow.

== Examples of Ricci solitons ==
=== Shrinking ($\lambda > 0$) ===
- Gaussian shrinking soliton $(\mathbb{R}^n, g_{eucl}, f(x) = \frac{\lambda}{2}|x|^2)$
- Shrinking round sphere $S^n, n \geq 2$
- Shrinking round cylinder $S^{n-1} \times \R, n \geq 3$
- The four dimensional FIK shrinker (discovered by M. Feldman, T. Ilmanen, D. Knopf)
- The four dimensional BCCD shrinker (discovered by Richard Bamler, Charles Cifarelli, Ronan Conlon, and Alix Deruelle)
- Compact gradient Kähler-Ricci shrinkers
- Einstein manifolds of positive scalar curvature

=== Steady ($\lambda = 0$) ===
- The 2d cigar soliton (a.k.a. Witten's black hole) $\left(\mathbb{R}^2, g = \frac{dx^2 + dy^2}{1 + x^2 + y^2}, V = -2 ( x \frac{\partial}{\partial x} + y \frac{\partial}{\partial y}) \right)$
- The 3d rotationally symmetric Bryant soliton and its generalization to higher dimensions
- Ricci flat manifolds

=== Expanding ($\lambda < 0$) ===
- Expanding Kähler-Ricci solitons on the complex line bundles $O(-k), k>n$ over $\mathbb{C}P^n, n \geq 1$.
- Einstein manifolds of negative scalar curvature

== Singularity models in Ricci flow ==
Shrinking and steady Ricci solitons are fundamental objects in the study of Ricci flow as they appear as blow-up limits of singularities. In particular, it is known that all Type I singularities are modeled on non-collapsed gradient shrinking Ricci solitons. Type II singularities are expected to be modeled on steady Ricci solitons in general, however to date this has not been proven, even though all known examples are.

== Soliton Identities ==
Taking the trace of the Ricci soliton equation $Ric + \frac12 \mathcal{L}_V g = \lambda g$ gives

$S + \operatorname{div} V = \lambda n$,	1

where $S$ is the scalar curvature and $n = \operatorname{dim} M$. By taking the divergence of the Ricci soliton equation and invoking the contracted Bianchi identities and (1), it follows that

$$\Delta V + \operatorname{Ric} \circ V = 0 \quad \text{or equivalently, in components,} \quad \Delta V_i + \operatorname{Ric}_{ij} V^j = 0.$$

For gradient Ricci solitons $V = \nabla f$, similar arguments show

$$S + \Delta f = \lambda n \quad \text{and} \quad  \nabla ( S + | \nabla f|^2 - 2 \lambda f ) = 0.$$

In particular, if $M$ is connected, then there exists a constant $C$ such that

$$S + |\nabla f|^2 = 2 \lambda f + C.$$

Often, in the shrinking or expanding cases ($\lambda \ne 0$), $f$ is replaced by $f - \frac C{2 \lambda}$ to obtain a gradient Ricci soliton normalized such that $S + |\nabla f|^2 = 2 \lambda f$.
