= Bochner's tube theorem =

Theorem about holomorphic functions of several complex variables

In mathematics, Bochner's tube theorem (named for Salomon Bochner) shows that every function holomorphic on a tube domain in $\mathbb{C}^n$ can be extended to the convex hull of this domain.

Theorem Let $\omega \subset \mathbb{R}^n$ be a connected open set. Then every function $f(z)$ holomorphic on the tube domain $\Omega = \omega+i \mathbb{R}^n$ can be extended to a function holomorphic on the convex hull $\operatorname{ch}(\Omega)$.

A classic reference is Bochner & Martin (1948) (Theorem 9). See also Hounie (2009) and Noguchi (2020) for other proofs.

== Generalizations ==
The generalized version of this theorem was first proved by Kazlow (1979), also proved by Boivin and Dwilewicz (1998) under more less complicated hypothese.

Theorem Let $\omega$ be a connected submanifold of $\mathbb{R}^n$ of class-$C^2$. Then every continuous CR function on the tube domain $\Omega(\omega)$ can be continuously extended to a CR function on $\Omega(\text{ach}(\omega)).\ \left(\Omega(\omega) = \omega+i \mathbb{R}^n\subset\mathbb{C}^n\ \left(n\geq 2\right), \text{ach}(\omega):=\omega\cup \text{Int}\ \text{ch}(\omega)\right)$. By "Int ch(S)" we will mean the interior taken in the smallest dimensional space which contains "ch(S)".
