= Konstanze Rietsch =

Mathematician

Konstanze Rietsch is a pure mathematician who was educated in Austria and the US. She works in the UK as Professor of Geometry at King's College London.

== Research ==
Rietsch's research concerns the geometry of flag varieties and mirror symmetry in Lie theory.

== Education and career ==
Rietsch received a master's degree in 1993 from the University of Vienna in 1993 and completed a Ph.D. in 1998 at the Massachusetts Institute of Technology. Her doctoral dissertation, Total Positivity and Real Flag Varieties, was supervised by George Lusztig.

Following her doctorate, she visited the Institute for Advanced Study in Princeton, New Jersey, and became a postdoctoral research fellow in Newnham College, Cambridge. Next, she became a Violette and Samuel Glasstone Research Fellow at the Mathematical Institute, University of Oxford.

She moved to King's College in 2002.

== Recognition ==
Rietsch is an invited speaker at the 2026 International Congress of Mathematicians.
