= Bergman–Weil formula =

In mathematics, the Bergman–Weil formula is an integral representation for holomorphic functions of several variables generalizing the Cauchy integral formula. It was introduced by Bergmann (1936) and Weil (1935).

== Weil domains ==
A Weil domain (Weil 1935) is an analytic polyhedron with a domain U in C^{n} defined by inequalities f_{j}(z) < 1 for functions f_{j} that are holomorphic on some neighborhood of the closure of U, such that the faces of the Weil domain (where one of the functions is 1 and the others are less than 1) all have dimension 2n − 1, and the intersections of k faces have codimension at least k.

== See also ==
- Andreotti–Norguet formula
- Bochner–Martinelli formula
