= M. T. Cheng =

Chinese mathematician

M. T. Cheng or Cheng Minde (Chinese: 程民德; pinyin: Chéng Míndé; 24 January 1917 – 26 November 1998) was a Chinese mathematician. He was the main founder of Peking University Mathematical Research Institute, and longtime head of the Department of Mathematics of Peking University.

== Biography ==
Cheng was born 24 January 1917 in Suzhou, Jiangsu, China. His father Cheng Zhanlu (程瞻庐) was a notable novelist.

In 1935, Cheng became a student of the Department of Electrical Engineering of Zhejiang University in Hangzhou. Due to Su Buqing's advice, he later transferred into the Department of Mathematics. He graduated BS and MS (in autumn 1942).

From 1942 to 1943, Cheng took his internship as an electrical engineer in a factory in Chongqing, the war-time capital of China during the Second Sino-Japanese War.

From 1943 to 1946, Cheng was a lecturer at the Department of Mathematics of Zhejiang University. From 1946 to 1947, he lectured at the mathematical department of Peking University.

In 1947, Cheng went to the US to continue his study at Princeton University. His doctoral advisor was Salomon Bochner. Cheng earned his PhD in 1949, and did his postdoctoral research at Princeton till Jan 1950.

Cheng went back to China. From Jan 1951 to 1952, he was an associate professor and later professor at the Department of Mathematics of Tsinghua University. Since 1952, he was a professor at the Department of Mathematics of Peking University. From 1978 to 1988, he was the Director of the Mathematical Research Institute of Peking University.

Cheng was elected into Chinese Academy of Sciences as an academician in 1980. From 1982 to 1988, he was the President of Beijing Mathematical Society. From 1983 to 1988, he was a Vice-president of Chinese Mathematical Society.

Cheng was a pioneer of harmonic analysis and image processing and recognition in modern China. The famous digital innovator Wang Xuan was also one of his students.

Cheng died on 26 November 1998 in Beijing.

== Memory ==
- A Great Tree: Memorial Collections of Cheng Minde (Chinese: 一棵挺拔的大树：程民德先生纪念文集); Peking University Press; 1 November 2000; ISBN 7-301-01777-4.
