= He Xuhua =

Chinese mathematician

Xuhua He
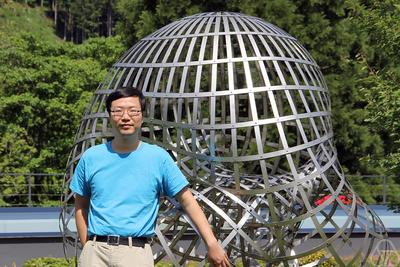
- He at Oberwolfach in 2017
- Born: 1979 (age 46–47); Chongqing, China
- Education: Peking University (BS); Massachusetts Institute of Technology (PhD)
- Known for: Affine Deligne–Lusztig varieties Hecke algebra cocenters Total positivity
- Awards: Chevalley Prize in Lie Theory (2022); Morningside Gold Medal (2013); Member of the Hong Kong Academy of Sciences (2026); Fellow of the American Mathematical Society (2025); New Cornerstone Investigator (2023); Xplorer Prize (2020); IMO Gold Medal (1996)
- Scientific career
- Fields: Mathematics
- Workplaces: University of Hong Kong
- Doctoral advisor: George Lusztig
- Website: hkumath.hku.hk/~xuhuahe

Xuhua He (Chinese: 何旭华; pinyin: Hé Xùhuá, born 1979) is a Chinese mathematician. He is a Chair Professor of Mathematics at the University of Hong Kong and has been the President of the Hong Kong Mathematical Society since 2024, serving consecutive terms for 2024–2026 and 2026–2028. His research lies at the intersection of algebraic groups, representation theory, and arithmetic geometry.

== Education and career ==
In 2001, He graduated with a bachelor's degree in mathematics from Peking University. In 2005, he earned his PhD from the Massachusetts Institute of Technology (MIT) with the thesis Some subvarieties of the De Concini-Procesi compactification under advisor George Lusztig. As a postdoc research fellow, He was at the Institute for Advanced Study for the academic year 2005–2006 and Simons Instructor at the State University of New York at Stony Brook from 2006 to 2008. At Hong Kong University of Science and Technology he was an assistant professor from 2008 to 2012 and an associate professor from 2012 to 2014. From 2014 to 2019 he was a professor at the University of Maryland. In 2019 he became the Choh-Ming Li Professor of Mathematics at the Chinese University of Hong Kong and joined the University of Hong Kong as a Chair Professor in 2023.

For the 2016–2017 academic year, He was a von Neumann Fellow at the Institute for Advanced Study. In 2017 he was a Simons Visiting Professor at the Université Sorbonne Paris Nord (Paris 13 University).

== Awards and honors ==
- 2026 – Member of the Hong Kong Academy of Sciences.
- 2025 – Fellow of the American Mathematical Society.
- 2023 – New Cornerstone Investigator.
- 2022 – Chevalley Prize in Lie Theory (American Mathematical Society).
- 2020 – Xplorer Prize in Mathematics and Physics.
- 2018 – Invited sectional speaker at the International Congress of Mathematicians (ICM) in Rio de Janeiro.
- 2015 – Invited speaker at the Current Developments in Mathematics (CDM) conference at Harvard University and MIT.
- 2013 – Morningside Gold Medal at the International Congress of Chinese Mathematicians.
- 1996 – Gold medal at the International Mathematical Olympiad.

== Selected publications ==
- A. J. de Jong, X. He and J. Starr, "Families of rationally simply connected varieties over surfaces and torsors for semisimple groups", Publications Mathématiques de l'IHÉS 114 (2011), 1–85.
- X. He and G. Lusztig, "A generalization of Steinberg's cross-section", Journal of the American Mathematical Society 25 (2012), 739–757.
- X. He, "Geometric and homological properties of affine Deligne–Lusztig varieties", Annals of Mathematics (2) 179 (2014), 367–404.
- X. He and S. Nie, "Minimal length elements of extended affine Weyl group", Compositio Mathematica 150 (2014), 1903–1927.
- X. He, "Cocenters of p-adic groups, I: Newton decomposition", Forum of Mathematics, Pi 6 (2018), e2.
- D. Ciubotaru and X. He, "Cocenters of p-adic groups, III: Elliptic cocenter and rigid cocenter", Peking Mathematical Journal 4 (2021), 159–186.
- U. Görtz, X. He and S. Nie, "Fully Hodge–Newton decomposable Shimura varieties", Peking Mathematical Journal 2 (2019), no. 2, 99–154.
- X. He and R. Zhou, "On the connected components of affine Deligne–Lusztig varieties", Duke Mathematical Journal 169 (2020), no. 14, 2697–2765.
- H. Bao and X. He, "Product structure and regularity theorem for totally nonnegative flag varieties", Inventiones Mathematicae 237 (2024), no. 1, 1–47.
- B. Dong, X. He, P. Jin, F. Schremmer, Q. Yu, "Machine learning assisted exploration for affine Deligne–Lusztig varieties", Peking Mathematical Journal 9 (2026), no. 1, 55–104.
