= Salomon Bochner =

Austrian mathematician (1899–1982)

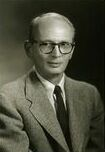
- circa 1970
- Born: 20 August 1899; Podgórze, Austria-Hungary
- Died: 2 May 1982 (aged 82); Houston, Texas
- Education: Friedrich Wilhelm University of Berlin
- Known for: Bochner's formula Bochner identity Bochner integral Bochner space Bochner's theorem Bochner's tube theorem Bochner–Martinelli formula Bochner–Minlos theorem Bochner–Riesz mean Bochner–Yano theorem Formal group law
- Awards: Steele Prize (1979)
- Scientific career
- Fields: Mathematics
- Workplaces: Ludwig-Maximilians-Universität München; Princeton University; Institute for Advanced Study; Rice University
- Doctoral advisor: Erhard Schmidt
- Doctoral students: Richard Askey; Eugenio Calabi; Jeff Cheeger; M. T. Cheng; Charles L. Dolph; Hillel Furstenberg; Robert Gunning; Israel Halperin; Sigurdur Helgason; Carl Herz; Gilbert Hunt; Samuel Karlin; Anthony Knapp; Paco Lagerstrom; Lynn Loomis; Harry Rauch; Joseph H. Sampson; Herbert Scarf; William A. Veech; Gerard Washnitzer; Bernard Russell Gelbaum

Salomon Bochner (20 August 1899 – 2 May 1982) was a Galician-born mathematician known for his work in analysis, probability theory and differential geometry.

In 1979, he was awarded the Steele Prize by the American Mathematical Society.

== Life ==
Salomon Bochner was born into a Jewish family in Podgórze, near Kraków, in Austria-Hungary (now Poland). Fearful of a Russian invasion of Galicia at the beginning of World War I in 1914, his family moved to Germany. Bochner was educated at a Berlin gymnasium and then at the Friedrich Wilhelm University of Berlin. There, he was a student of Erhard Schmidt, writing a dissertation involving what would later be called the Bergman kernel. Shortly after this, he left the academy to help his family during the escalating inflation.

After returning to mathematical research, he lectured at the Ludwig-Maximilians-Universität München from 1924 to 1933. His academic career in Germany ended after the Nazis came to power in 1933, and he left for a position at Princeton University. He was a visiting scholar at the Institute for Advanced Study from 1945 to 1948. He was appointed as Henry Burchard Fine Professor in 1959, retiring in 1968. Although he was seventy years old when he retired from Princeton, Bochner was appointed as Edgar Odell Lovett Professor of Mathematics at Rice University and went on to hold this chair until his death in 1982. He became Head of the Department at Rice in 1969 and held this position until 1976. He died in Houston, Texas. He was an Orthodox Jew.

== Mathematical work ==
In 1925, he started work in the area of almost periodic functions, simplifying the approach of Harald Bohr by use of compactness and approximate identity arguments. In 1933, he defined the Bochner integral, as it is now called, for vector-valued functions. Bochner's theorem on Fourier transforms appeared in a 1932 book. His techniques came into their own as Pontryagin duality and then the representation theory of locally compact groups developed in the following years.

Subsequently, he worked on multiple Fourier series, posing the question of the Bochner–Riesz means. This led to results on how the Fourier transform on Euclidean space behaves under rotations.

In differential geometry, Bochner's formula on curvature was published in 1946. Joint work with Kentaro Yano (1912–1993) led to the 1953 book Curvature and Betti Numbers. It had consequences for the Kodaira vanishing theory, representation theory, and spin manifolds. Bochner also worked on functions of several complex variables, resulting in the Bochner–Martinelli formula and the book Several Complex Variables (with W. T. Martin in 1948).

== Selected publications ==
- Bochner, S. (1932). Vorlesungen über Fouriersche Integrale. Leipzig: Akademische Verlagsgesellschaft m.b.H.
  - Bochner, S. (1948). Vorlesungen über Fouriersche Integrale. New York: Chelsea Pub. Co.
  - Bochner, S. (1959). Lectures on Fourier integrals; with an author's supplement on monotonic functions, Stieltjes integrals, and harmonic analysis. Translated from the original by Morris Tenenbaum and Harry Pollard. Princeton, N.J.: Princeton University Press.
- Bochner, S. (1938). Lectures on commutative algebra. Ann Arbor, Mich.: Planographed by Edwards Brothers, inc. Lectures given in 1937-1938, notes by J. W. Tukey, J. Giese, and V. Martin.
- Bochner, S.; Martin, William Ted (1948). Several complex variables. Princeton: Princeton Univ. Press.
- Bochner, S.; Chandrasekharan, K. (1949). Fourier transforms. Princeton: Princeton Univ. Press. 2016 reprint
- Yano, K.; Bochner, S. (1953). Curvature and Betti numbers. Princeton: Princeton University Press. ISBN 0691095833.
- Bochner, S. (1955). Harmonic Analysis and the Theory of Probability. University of California Press. 2013 reprint
- Bochner, S. (1966). Role of mathematics in the rise of science. Princeton, N.J.: Princeton University Press. 2014 reprint
- Bochner, S. (1969). Selected mathematical papers of Salomon Bochner. New York: W. A. Benjamin.
- Bochner, S. (1969). Eclosion and synthesis; perspectives on the history of knowledge. New York: W. A. Benjamin.
- Bochner, S. (1979). Einstein between centuries. Houston, Texas: William Marsh Rice University.
- Bochner, Salomon (1992), Gunning, Robert C. (ed.), Collected papers. Part 1, Providence, R.I.: American Mathematical Society, ISBN 978-0-8218-0174-1, MR 1151390
- Bochner, Salomon (1992), Gunning, Robert C. (ed.), Collected papers. Part 2, Providence, R.I.: American Mathematical Society, ISBN 978-0-8218-0175-8, MR 1151391
- Bochner, Salomon (1992), Gunning, Robert C. (ed.), Collected papers. Part 3, Providence, R.I.: American Mathematical Society, ISBN 978-0-8218-0176-5, MR 1151392
- Bochner, Salomon (1992), Gunning, Robert C. (ed.), Collected papers. Part 4, Providence, R.I.: American Mathematical Society, ISBN 978-0-8218-0177-2, MR 1151393

== See also ==
- Bochner almost periodic functions
- Bochner–Kodaira–Nakano identity
- Bochner Laplacian
- Bochner measurable function
