= George Lusztig =

Romanian–American mathematician

- Born: May 20, 1946 (age 80); Timișoara, Kingdom of Romania
- Citizenship: Romanian, British, American
- Education: University of Bucharest (BSc); Princeton University (PhD)
- Known for: Canonical basis Deligne–Lusztig theory Kazhdan–Lusztig polynomial
- Awards: ICM Speaker (1974, 1983, 1990); Berwick Prize (1977); Guggenheim Fellowship (1982); FRS (1983); Cole Prize (1985); Brouwer Medal (1999); Leroy P. Steele Prize (2008); Shaw Prize (2014); Wolf Prize in Mathematics (2022); Basic Science Lifetime Award (2025)
- Scientific career
- Fields: Mathematics
- Workplaces: University of Warwick; Massachusetts Institute of Technology
- Doctoral advisor: Michael Atiyah; William Browder
- Doctoral students: Corrado de Concini; Ian Grojnowski; Xuhua He; Konstanze Rietsch

George Lusztig (born Gheorghe Lusztig, May 20, 1946) is a Romanian-born Hungarian-American mathematician and Abdun Nur professor at the Massachusetts Institute of Technology (MIT). He was a Norbert Wiener professor in the Department of Mathematics from 1999 to 2009.

== Education and career ==
Born in Timișoara to a Hungarian-Jewish family, he did his undergraduate studies at the University of Bucharest, graduating in 1968. Later that year he left Romania for the United Kingdom, where he spent several months at the University of Warwick and Oxford University. In 1969 he moved to the United States, where he went to work for two years with Michael Atiyah at the Institute for Advanced Study in Princeton, New Jersey. He received his PhD in mathematics in 1971 after completing a doctoral dissertation, titled "Novikov's higher signature and families of elliptic operators", under the supervision of William Browder and Michael Atiyah.

Lusztig worked for almost seven years at the University of Warwick. His involvement at the university encompassed a Research Fellowship, (1971–72); lecturer in Mathematics, (1972–74); and Professor of Mathematics, (1974–78). In 1978, he accepted a chair at MIT.

== Contributions ==
He is known for his work on representation theory, in particular for the objects closely related to algebraic groups, such as finite reductive groups, Hecke algebras, $p$-adic groups, quantum groups, and Weyl groups. He essentially paved the way for modern representation theory. This has included fundamental new concepts, including the character sheaves, the Deligne–Lusztig varieties, and the Kazhdan–Lusztig polynomials.

== Awards and honors ==
In 1983, Lusztig was elected as a fellow of the Royal Society. In 1985, Lusztig won the Cole Prize (Algebra). He was elected to the National Academy of Sciences in 1992. He received the Brouwer Medal in 1999, the National Order of Faithful Service in 2003 and the Leroy P. Steele Prize for Lifetime Achievement in Mathematics in 2008. In 2012, he became a fellow of the American Mathematical Society and in 2014, he received the Shaw Prize in Mathematics. In 2022, he received the Wolf Prize in Mathematics. In 2024, he received the Gold Medal of the UVT (Western University of Timisoara). In 2025, he received the Basic Science Lifetime Award.
