= Basic Science Lifetime Award =

Science prize

The Basic Science Lifetime Award has been awarded yearly since 2023 to "extraordinary scientists whose work in basic science has been both outstanding and innovative and have, over the course of the past thirty years or more, brought about fundamental change in his or her discipline". There have been awards in Mathematics, Physics, Theoretical Computer and Information Sciences, and Information Science and Engineering. The prizes are awarded at the International Congress of Basic Science, held every year in Beijing in July.

== Award winners ==
- 2023 Math, David Mumford for his fundamental contributions to algebraic geometry.
- 2023 Theoretical Computer and Information Sciences, Adi Shamir for his profound contributions to modern cryptography and computational complexity.
- 2024 Math, Andrew Wiles for his monumental proof of Fermat's Last Theorem in 1995.
- 2024 Math, Richard S. Hamilton for his groundbreaking contributions to geometric analysis and partial differential equations.
- 2024 Theoretical Physics, Edward Witten for his pivotal contributions to string theory and quantum field theory.
- 2024 Theoretical Physics, Alexei Kitaev for his groundbreaking contributions to the fields of quantum computing and condensed matter physics.
- 2024 Theoretical Computer and Information Sciences, Andrew Yao for groundbreaking work that has deeply influenced theoretical computer science.
- 2024 Theoretical Computer and Information Sciences, Leslie Valiant for his groundbreaking work in theoretical computer science.
- 2025 Math, Shigefumi Mori for groundbreaking contributions to algebraic geometry that have reshaped the discipline and inspired generations of mathematicians
- 2025 Math, George Lusztig for profound and far-reaching contributions that have transformed the landscape of representation theory, algebraic geometry, and related fields.
- 2025 Physics, David Gross for groundbreaking contributions that have profoundly shaped our understanding of the fundamental forces of nature.
- 2025 Physics, Samuel C C Ting for groundbreaking discoveries that have profoundly advanced our understanding of the fundamental building blocks of the universe.
- 2025 Information Science and Engineering, Steven Chu for groundbreaking contributions that have transformed our understanding of energy, climate, and technology.
- 2025 Information Science and Engineering, Robert Tarjan for groundbreaking contributions to graph algorithms and data structures that have fundamentally reshaped the field of information science.
