= Stefano Montaldo =

Italian mathematician

Stefano Montaldo is an Italian mathematician and professor working at the University of Cagliari in the fields of differential geometry, global analysis, and biharmonic maps.

Montaldo earned his Ph.D. from the University of Leeds in 1996, under the supervision of John C. Wood.
