= Bochner identity =

Identity concerning harmonic maps between Riemannian manifolds

In mathematics — specifically, differential geometry — the Bochner identity is an identity concerning harmonic maps between Riemannian manifolds. The identity is named after the American mathematician Salomon Bochner.

== Statement of the result ==
Let M and N be Riemannian manifolds and let u : M → N be a harmonic map. Let du denote the derivative (pushforward) of u, ∇ the gradient, Δ the Laplace–Beltrami operator, Riem_{N} the Riemann curvature tensor on N and Ric_{M} the Ricci curvature tensor on M. Then

$$\frac12 \Delta \big( | \nabla u |^{2} \big) = \big| \nabla ( \mathrm{d} u ) \big|^{2} + \big\langle \mathrm{Ric}_{M} \nabla u, \nabla u \big\rangle - \big\langle \mathrm{Riem}_{N} (u) (\nabla u, \nabla u) \nabla u, \nabla u \big\rangle.$$

== See also ==
- Bochner's formula
