= Sigmundur Már Herbertsson =

Icelandic basketball referee (born 1968)

Personal information
- Born: 1 August 1968 (age 58) Iceland

Career information
- Playing career: 1987–199?
- Position: Basketball referee
- Officiating career: 1994–present

Career history
- 1987: Reynir Sandgerði
- 1989–1990: Njarðvík
- 1990–199?: Njarðvík-b
- 199?–199?: Víðir Garði

Career highlights
- As referee: 13× Icelandic Referee of the Year (2005–2011, 2013, 2015–2019, 2021)

Sigmundur Már Herbertsson (born 1 August 1968) is an Icelandic basketball referee and former player. He has been named the Icelandic Referee of the Year fourteen times. He was a FIBA referee from 2004 to 2018 and officiated a total of 233 international games during his career.

== Playing career ==
Sigmundur came up through the junior ranks of Njarðvík. He played for the senior team for a short while, including in the FIBA European Cup Winners' Cup. He also played for Víðir Garði, Reynir Sandgerði og Ungtemplarafélagið Hrönn during his career.

On 6 December 1990, he scored 32 points for Njarðvík-b in a 93–77 victory against Skallagrímur in the Icelandic Cup. On 12 March 1995, he scored 43 points, including 12 three pointers, for Víðir Garði in a 122–48 against Grótta.

== Officiating career ==
Sigmundur started officiating in 1994. He first officiated in the Icelandic top-tier Úrvalsdeild karla in 1995 when he was called in as a replacement referee for a game between Keflavík and Valur.

He became a FIBA referee in 2004. In 2015 he became the first Icelandic referee to officiated at EuroBasket.

On 12 October 2018, he was part of the oldest referee trio in Úrvalsdeild karla history when he officiated a game between Keflavík and KR along with Leifur Garðarsson and Rögnvaldur Már Hreiðarsson.

On 6 May 2021, he became the second Icelandic referee, after Rögnvaldur Már, to officiate 2,000 games in the Icelandic basketball tournament. On 18 November 2021, he broke Rögnaldur's all-time record when he officiated his 2,054 game in the Icelandic basketball tournament.

In January 2024, Sigmundur became the second referee to officiate 800 games in the Úrvalsdeild karla.

=== Awards ===
- Icelandic Basketball Referee of the Year (14)
  - 2005, 2006, 2007, 2008, 2009, 2010, 2011, 2013, 2015, 2016, 2017, 2018, 2019, 2021, 2022
