= Bochner's formula =

Formula in differential geometry

In mathematics, Bochner's formula is a statement relating harmonic functions on a Riemannian manifold $(M, g)$ to the Ricci curvature. The formula is named after the American mathematician Salomon Bochner.

== Formal statement ==
If $u \colon M \rightarrow \mathbb{R}$ is a smooth function, then

$$\tfrac12 \Delta|\nabla u|^2 = g(\nabla\Delta u,\nabla u) + |\nabla^2 u|^2 + \mbox{Ric}(\nabla u, \nabla u)$$,

where $\nabla u$ is the gradient of $u$ with respect to $g$, $\nabla^2 u$ is the Hessian of $u$ with respect to $g$ and $\mbox{Ric}$ is the Ricci curvature tensor. If $u$ is harmonic (i.e., $\Delta u = 0$, where $\Delta=\Delta_g$ is the Laplacian with respect to the metric $g$), Bochner's formula becomes

$$\tfrac12 \Delta|\nabla u| ^2 = |\nabla^2 u|^2 + \mbox{Ric}(\nabla u, \nabla u)$$.

Bochner used this formula to prove the Bochner vanishing theorem.

As a corollary, if $(M, g)$ is a Riemannian manifold without boundary and $u \colon M \rightarrow \mathbb{R}$ is a smooth, compactly supported function, then

$$\int_M (\Delta u)^2 \, d\mbox{vol} = \int_M \Big( |\nabla^2 u|^2 + \mbox{Ric}(\nabla u, \nabla u) \Big) \, d\mbox{vol}$$.

This immediately follows from the first identity, observing that the integral of the left-hand side vanishes (by the divergence theorem) and integrating by parts the first term on the right-hand side.

== Variations and generalizations ==
- Bochner identity
- Weitzenböck identity
