= Peter Štefan =

Slovak mathematician (1941–1978)

Peter Štefan (27 March 1941 in Bratislava, Slovak Republic – 18 June 1978 in Tryfan, Wales) was a Slovak mathematician who was known for his works on dynamical systems and mathematical entropy.

He attended school in Bratislava, and then Charles University in Prague. In 1968, he was involved in politics in Czechoslovakia, supporting the political movement that sought to humanize Communist rule during the Prague Spring. As he was visiting the University of Warwick, though, the Soviet Union and several Warsaw Pact allies invaded the country, installing a Soviet-controlled regime. Štefan feared that he would be in danger if he returned, and he decided to stay in Britain. He remained in Warwick, where he studied for a Ph.D. which was awarded in 1973. His thesis was on Accessibility and singular foliations, a topic which is important in control theory and in the mathematical theory of entropy.

He died while climbing Tryfan on 18 June 1978.
