= Clifford John Earle Jr. =

American mathematician

Clifford John Earle, Jr. (November 3, 1935 – June 12, 2017) was an American mathematician who specialized in complex variables and Teichmüller spaces.

== Biography ==
Earle was born in Racine, Wisconsin in 1935. He received his bachelor's degree from Swarthmore College in 1957, his master's degree from Harvard University in 1958, and his Ph.D. in 1962 under Lars Ahlfors with thesis Teichmüller Spaces of Groups of the Second Kind. From 1963 to 1965 he was at the Institute for Advanced Study. In 1965 he became an assistant professor and in 1969 a full professor at Cornell University. From 1976 to 1979 he was the chair of the mathematics department at Cornell.

Earle's research dealt with Teichmüller spaces (i.e. moduli spaces of Riemann surfaces) and the related theories of quasiconformal mappings (following Ahlfors and Lipman Bers) and Kleinian groups.

With James Eells in 1967 he mathematically described, for any compact Riemann surface X, the homotopy types of spaces of diffeomorphisms of X and thus a new characterization of the Teichmüller space of X. In 1969 Earle and Eells extended the 1967 result to non-orientable surfaces, and in 1970 Earle and Schatz extended the 1967 result to surfaces with boundary.

Earle was a Guggenheim Fellow for the academic year 1974/75. In 2012 he was elected a Fellow of the American Mathematical Society.

He was married in 1960 and had two children and two grandchildren. He died at a hospice in Ithaca, New York on June 12, 2017.

== Selected works ==
- Earle, Clifford J.; Eells, James (1969), "A fibre bundle description of Teichmüller theory", Journal of Differential Geometry, 3 (1–2): 19–43, doi:10.4310/jdg/1214428816
- Earle, Clifford J.; Schatz, A. (1970), "Teichmüller theory for surfaces with boundary", Journal of Differential Geometry, 4 (2): 169–185, doi:10.4310/jdg/1214429381
- Earle, Clifford J.; Eells, James (1967), "The diffeomorphism group of a compact Riemann surface", Bulletin of the American Mathematical Society, 73 (4): 557–559, doi:10.1090/S0002-9904-1967-11746-4, MR 0212840
- Earle, Clifford J. (1978), "Families of Riemann surfaces and Jacobi varieties", Annals of Mathematics, 107 (2): 255–286, doi:10.2307/1971144, JSTOR 1971144
- Douady, Adrien; Earle, Clifford J. (1986), "Conformally natural extension of homeomorphisms of the circle", Acta Mathematica, 157: 23–48, doi:10.1007/bf02392590
- with Irwin Kra, S. L. Krushkal´ Holomorphic motions and Teichmüller spaces, Transactions of the American Mathematical Society 343, 1994, pp. 927–948.
- with Kra On sections of some holomorphic families of closed Riemann surfaces, Acta Mathematica 137, 1976, 49-79
- On holomorphic families of pointed Riemann Surfaces, Bulletin of the American Mathematical Society, 79, 1973, pp. 163–166
- The Teichmüller space of an arbitrary Fuchsian group; Bulletin of the American Mathematical Society, 70, 1964, 669-701
- with Frederick P. Gardiner Geometric isomorphisms between infinite dimensional Teichmüller spaces, Transactions AMS, 348, 1996, pp. 1163–1190

== Sources ==
- Y. Jiang, S. Mitra (eds.): Quasiconformal Mappings, Riemann Surfaces, and Teichmüller Spaces, AMS Special Session held in honor of Clifford Earle Jr., Syracuse 2010, Contemporary Mathematics, AMS 2012
