= Bochner–Martinelli formula =

Generalization of the Cauchy integral formula

In mathematics, the Bochner–Martinelli formula is a generalization of the Cauchy integral formula to functions of several complex variables, introduced by Enzo Martinelli (1938) and Salomon Bochner (1943).

== History ==
Formula (53) of the present paper and a proof of theorem 5 based on it have just been published by Enzo Martinelli (...). The present author may be permitted to state that these results have been presented by him in a Princeton graduate course in Winter 1940/1941 and were subsequently incorporated, in a Princeton doctorate thesis (June 1941) by Donald C. May, entitled: An integral formula for analytic functions of k variables with some applications.

— Salomon Bochner, (Bochner 1943, p. 652, footnote 1).

However this author's claim in loc. cit. footnote 1, that he might have been familiar with the general shape of the formula before Martinelli, was wholly unjustified and is hereby being retracted.

— Salomon Bochner, (Bochner 1947, p. 15, footnote *).

== Bochner–Martinelli kernel ==
For ζ, z in $\C^n$ the Bochner–Martinelli kernel ω(ζ,z) is a differential form in ζ of bidegree (n,n−1) defined by

$$\omega(\zeta,z) = \frac{(n-1)!}{(2\pi i)^n}\frac{1}{|z-\zeta|^{2n}}
\sum_{1\le j\le n}(\overline\zeta_j-\overline z_j) \, d\overline\zeta_1 \land d\zeta_1 \land \cdots \land  d\zeta_j \land \cdots \land d\overline\zeta_n \land d\zeta_n$$

(where the term dζ̅_{j} is omitted).

Suppose that f is a continuously differentiable function on the closure of a domain D in $\mathbb{C}$^{n} with piecewise smooth boundary ∂D. Then the Bochner–Martinelli formula states that if z is in the domain D then

$$\displaystyle f(z) = \int_{\partial D}f(\zeta)\omega(\zeta, z) - \int_D\overline\partial f(\zeta)\land\omega(\zeta,z).$$

In particular if f is holomorphic the second term vanishes, so

$$\displaystyle f(z) = \int_{\partial D}f(\zeta)\omega(\zeta, z).$$

== See also ==
- Bergman–Weil formula
