= James Eells =

American mathematician (1926–2007)

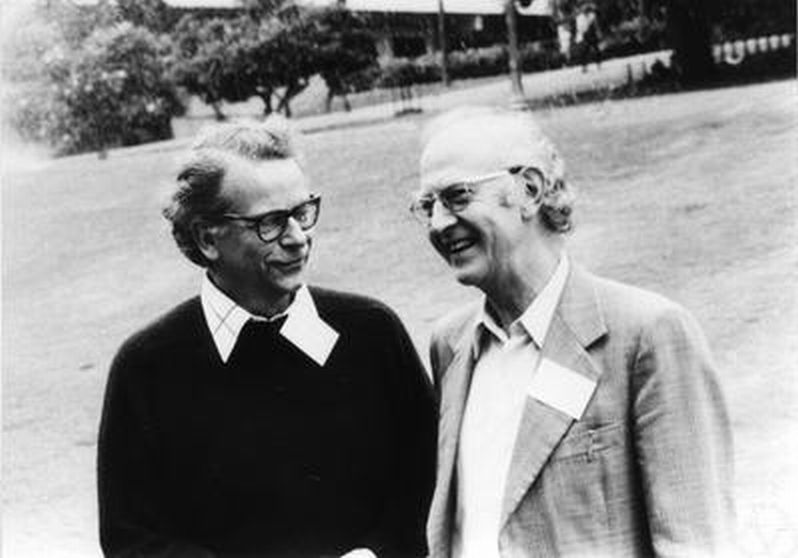
- James Eells (left) and Nicolaas Kuiper (right) at the 1979 Chern Symposium in Berkeley, California
- Born: October 25, 1926; Cleveland, Ohio
- Died: February 14, 2007 (aged 80); Cambridge, UK
- Known for: Harmonic maps
- Spouse: Anna Eells
- Scientific career
- Fields: Mathematics
- Thesis: Geometric Aspects of Integration Theory (1954)
- Doctoral advisor: Hassler Whitney
- Doctoral students: John C. Wood

James Eells (October 25, 1926 – February 14, 2007) was an American mathematician, who specialized in mathematical analysis.

== Biography ==
Eells was born on 25 October 1926, in Cleveland, Ohio. Eells studied mathematics at Bowdoin College in Maine and earned his undergraduate degree in 1947. After graduation he spent one year teaching mathematics at Robert College in Istanbul and starting in 1948 was for two years an instructor at Amherst College in Amherst, Massachusetts. Next he undertook graduate study at Harvard University, where in 1954 he received his Ph.D. under Hassler Whitney with thesis Geometric Aspects of Integration Theory.

In the academic year 1955–1956 he was at the Institute for Advanced Study (and subsequently in 1962–1963, 1972–1973, 1977, and 1982). He taught at Columbia University for several years. In 1964 he became a full professor at Cornell University. In 1963 and in 1966–1967 he was at the University of Cambridge, and after a visit to the new mathematics department developed by Erik Christopher Zeeman at the University of Warwick Eells became a professor of mathematical analysis there in 1969. Eells organized many of the University of Warwick Symposia in mathematics.

In 1986 he became the first director of the mathematics section of the Abdus Salam International Centre for Theoretical Physics in Trieste; for six years he served as director in addition to his appointment at the University of Warwick. In 1992 he retired and lived in Cambridge.

Eells did research on global analysis, especially, harmonic maps on Riemannian manifolds, which are important in the theory of minimal surfaces and theoretical physics. His doctoral students included John C. Wood.

In 1970 he was an invited speaker at the International Mathematical Congress in Nice (On Fredholm manifolds with K. D. Elworthy).

He was co-editor of the collected works of Hassler Whitney. Eells's doctoral students include Luc Lemaire, Peter Štefan (1941–1978), Giorgio Valli (1960–1999) and Pierre de la Harpe. Eells was married since 1950 and had a son and three daughters.

== Publications ==
- Eells, James (1955). "Geometric aspects of currents and distributions". Proceedings of the National Academy of Sciences of the United States of America. 41 (7): 493–496. Bibcode:1955PNAS...41..493E. doi:10.1073/pnas.41.7.493. PMC 528123. PMID 16589704.
- Eells, James (1959). "On submanifolds of certain function spaces". Proceedings of the National Academy of Sciences of the United States of America. 45 (10): 1520–1522. Bibcode:1959PNAS...45.1520E. doi:10.1073/pnas.45.10.1520. PMC 222748. PMID 16590536.
- Earle, Clifford J.; Eells, James (1967). "The diffeomorphism group of a compact Riemann surface". Bulletin of the American Mathematical Society. 73 (4): 557–559. doi:10.1090/S0002-9904-1967-11746-4. MR 0212840.
- with J. H. Sampson: Eells, James; Sampson, J. H. (1964). "Harmonic Mappings of Riemannian Manifolds". American Journal of Mathematics. 86 (1): 109–160. doi:10.2307/2373037. JSTOR 2373037.
- Eells Jr, James (1966). "A setting for global analysis". Bulletin of the American Mathematical Society. 72 (5): 751–807. doi:10.1090/S0002-9904-1966-11558-6. MR 0203742.
- Singularities of smooth maps, London, Nelson 1967
- with Luc Lemaire: Eells, J.; Lemaire, L. (1978). "A report on harmonic maps". Bulletin of the London Mathematical Society. 10: 1–68. doi:10.1112/blms/10.1.1.; re-published with a follow-up report in the books Harmonic Maps, 1992, and Two Reports on Harmonic Maps, 1994, by publisher World Scientific
- with Luc Lemaire: Selected topics in harmonic maps, AMS 1983
- with Andrea Ratto: Harmonic maps and minimal immersions with symmetries – methods of ordinary differential equations applied to elliptic variational problems, Princeton University Press 1993
- with B. Fuglede: Harmonic maps between Riemannian polyhedra, Cambridge University Press 2001

== See also ==
- Eells–Kuiper manifold
