= Harmonic map =

Concept in mathematics

In the mathematical field of differential geometry, a smooth map between Riemannian manifolds is called harmonic if its coordinate representatives satisfy a certain nonlinear partial differential equation. This partial differential equation for a mapping also arises as the Euler–Lagrange equation of a functional called the Dirichlet energy. As such, the theory of harmonic maps contains both the theory of unit-speed geodesics in Riemannian geometry and the theory of harmonic functions.

Informally, the Dirichlet energy of a mapping f from a Riemannian manifold M to a Riemannian manifold N can be thought of as the total amount that f stretches M in allocating each of its elements to a point of N. For instance, an unstretched rubber band and a smooth stone can both be naturally viewed as Riemannian manifolds. Any way of stretching the rubber band over the stone can be viewed as a mapping between these manifolds, and the total tension involved is represented by the Dirichlet energy. Harmonicity of such a mapping means that, given any hypothetical way of physically deforming the given stretch, the tension (when considered as a function of time) has first derivative equal to zero when the deformation begins.

The theory of harmonic maps was initiated in 1964 by James Eells and Joseph Sampson, who showed that in certain geometric contexts, arbitrary maps could be deformed into harmonic maps. Their work was the inspiration for Richard Hamilton's initial work on the Ricci flow. Harmonic maps and the associated harmonic map heat flow, in and of themselves, are among the most widely studied topics in the field of geometric analysis.

The discovery of the "bubbling" of sequences of harmonic maps, due to Jonathan Sacks and Karen Uhlenbeck, has been particularly influential, as their analysis has been adapted to many other geometric contexts. Notably, Uhlenbeck's parallel discovery of bubbling of Yang–Mills fields is important in Simon Donaldson's work on four-dimensional manifolds, and Mikhael Gromov's later discovery of bubbling of pseudoholomorphic curves is significant in applications to symplectic geometry and quantum cohomology. The techniques used by Richard Schoen and Uhlenbeck to study the regularity theory of harmonic maps have likewise been the inspiration for the development of many analytic methods in geometric analysis.

== Geometry of mappings between manifolds ==
Here the geometry of a smooth mapping between Riemannian manifolds is considered via local coordinates and, equivalently, via linear algebra. Such a mapping defines both a first fundamental form and second fundamental form. The Laplacian (also called tension field) is defined via the second fundamental form, and its vanishing is the condition for the map to be harmonic. The definitions extend without modification to the setting of pseudo-Riemannian manifolds.

=== Local coordinates ===
Let U be an open subset of ℝ^{n} and let V be an open subset of ℝ^{m}. For each i and j between 1 and n, let g_{ij} be a smooth real-valued function on U, such that for each p in U, one has that the n × n matrix [g_{ij}(p)] is symmetric and positive-definite. For each α and β between 1 and m, let h_{αβ} be a smooth real-valued function on V, such that for each q in V, one has that the m × m matrix [h_{αβ}(q)] is symmetric and positive-definite. Denote the inverse matrices by [g^{ij}(p)] and [h^{αβ}(q)].

For each i, j, k between 1 and n and each α, β, γ between 1 and m define the Christoffel symbols Γ(g)^{k}_{ij} : U → ℝ and Γ(h)^{γ}_{αβ} : V → ℝ by

$$\begin{align}
\Gamma(g)_{ij}^k&=\frac{1}{2}\sum_{\ell=1}^m g^{k\ell}\left(\frac{\partial g_{j\ell}}{\partial x^i}+\frac{\partial g_{i\ell}}{\partial x^j}-\frac{\partial g_{ij}}{\partial x^\ell}\right) \\
\Gamma(h)_{\alpha\beta}^\gamma &= \frac{1}{2}\sum_{\delta=1}^n h^{\gamma\delta}\left(\frac{\partial h_{\beta\delta}}{\partial y^\alpha}+\frac{\partial h_{\alpha\delta}}{\partial y^\beta}-\frac{\partial h_{\alpha\beta}}{\partial y^\delta}\right)
\end{align}$$

Given a smooth map f from U to V, its second fundamental form defines for each i and j between 1 and n and for each α between 1 and m the real-valued function ∇(df)^{α}_{ij} on U by

$$\nabla(df)_{ij}^\alpha=\frac{\partial^2f^\alpha}{\partial x^i\partial x^j}-\sum_{k=1}^m\Gamma(g)_{ij}^k\frac{\partial f^\alpha}{\partial x^k}+\sum_{\beta=1}^n\sum_{\gamma=1}^n\frac{\partial f^\beta}{\partial x^i}\frac{\partial f^\gamma}{\partial x^j}\Gamma(h)_{\beta\gamma}^\alpha\circ f.$$

Its laplacian defines for each α between 1 and n the real-valued function (∆f)^{α} on U by

$$(\Delta f)^\alpha=\sum_{i=1}^m\sum_{j=1}^mg^{ij}\nabla(df)_{ij}^\alpha.$$

=== Bundle formalism ===
Let (M, g) and (N, h) be Riemannian manifolds. Given a smooth map f from M to N, one can consider its differential df as a section of the vector bundle T^{*}M ⊗ f^{*}TN over M; this is to say that for each p in M, one has a linear map df_{p} between tangent spaces T_{p}M → T_{f(p)}N. The vector bundle T^{*}M ⊗ f^{*}TN has a connection induced from the Levi-Civita connections on M and N. So one may take the covariant derivative ∇(df), which is a section of the vector bundle T^{*}M ⊗ T^{*}M ⊗ f^{*}TN over M; this is to say that for each p in M, one has a bilinear map (∇(df))_{p} of tangent spaces T_{p}M × T_{p}M → T_{f(p)}N. This section is known as the hessian of f.

Using g, one may trace the hessian of f to arrive at the laplacian of f, which is a section of the bundle f^{*}TN over M; this says that the laplacian of f assigns to each p in M an element of the tangent space T_{f(p)}N. By the definition of the trace operator, the laplacian may be written as

$$(\Delta f)_p=\sum_{i=1}^m\big(\nabla(df)\big)_p(e_i,e_i)$$

where e_{1}, ..., e_{m} is any g_{p}-orthonormal basis of T_{p}M.

== Dirichlet energy and its variation formulas ==
From the perspective of local coordinates, as given above, the energy density of a mapping f is the real-valued function on U given by

$$\frac{1}{2}\sum_{i=1}^m\sum_{j=1}^m\sum_{\alpha=1}^n\sum_{\beta=1}^n g^{ij}\frac{\partial f^\alpha}{\partial x^i}\frac{\partial f^\beta}{\partial x^j} (h_{\alpha\beta}\circ f).$$

Alternatively, in the bundle formalism, the Riemannian metrics on M and N induce a bundle metric on T^{*}M ⊗ f^{*}TN, and so one may define the energy density as the smooth function 1/2 | df |^{2} on M. It is also possible to consider the energy density as being given by (half of) the g-trace of the first fundamental form. Regardless of the perspective taken, the energy density e(f) is a function on M which is smooth and nonnegative. If M is oriented and M is compact, the Dirichlet energy of f is defined as

$$E(f)=\int_M e(f)\,d\mu_g$$

where dμ_{g} is the volume form on M induced by g. Since any nonnegative measurable function has a well-defined Lebesgue integral, it is not necessary to place the restriction that M is compact; however, then the Dirichlet energy could be infinite.

The variation formulas for the Dirichlet energy compute the derivatives of the Dirichlet energy E(f) as the mapping f is deformed. To this end, consider a one-parameter family of maps f_{s} : M → N with f_{0} = f for which there exists a precompact open set K of M such that f_{s}|_{M − K} = f|_{M − K} for all s; one supposes that the parametrized family is smooth in the sense that the associated map (−ε, ε) × M → N given by (s, p) ↦ f_{s}(p) is smooth.

- The first variation formula says that

$$\int_M \frac{\partial}{\partial s}\Big|_{s=0}e(f_s)\,d\mu_g=-\int_M h\left(\frac{\partial}{\partial s}\Big|_{s=0}f_s,\Delta f\right)\,d\mu_g$$

There is also a version for manifolds with boundary.

- There is also a second variation formula.

Due to the first variation formula, the Laplacian of f can be thought of as the gradient of the Dirichlet energy; correspondingly, a harmonic map is a critical point of the Dirichlet energy. This can be done formally in the language of global analysis and Banach manifolds.

== Examples of harmonic maps ==
Let (M, g) and (N, h) be smooth Riemannian manifolds. The notation g_{stan} is used to refer to the standard Riemannian metric on Euclidean space.

- Every totally geodesic map (M, g) → (N, h) is harmonic; this follows directly from the above definitions. As special cases:
  - For any q in N, the constant map (M, g) → (N, h) valued at q is harmonic.
  - The identity map (M, g) → (M, g) is harmonic.
- If f : M → N is an immersion, then f : (M, f^{*}h) → (N, h) is harmonic if and only if f is minimal relative to h. As a special case:
  - If f : ℝ → (N, h) is a constant-speed immersion, then f : (ℝ, g_{stan}) → (N, h) is harmonic if and only if f solves the geodesic differential equation.

Recall that if M is one-dimensional, then minimality of f is equivalent to f being geodesic, although this does not imply that it is a constant-speed parametrization, and hence does not imply that f solves the geodesic differential equation.

- A smooth map f : (M, g) → (ℝ^{n}, g_{stan}) is harmonic if and only if each of its n component functions are harmonic as maps (M, g) → (ℝ, g_{stan}). This coincides with the notion of harmonicity provided by the Laplace-Beltrami operator.
- Every holomorphic map between Kähler manifolds is harmonic.
- Every harmonic morphism between Riemannian manifolds is harmonic.

== Harmonic map heat flow ==
=== Well-posedness ===
Let (M, g) and (N, h) be smooth Riemannian manifolds. A harmonic map heat flow on an interval (a, b) assigns to each t in (a, b) a twice-differentiable map f_{t} : M → N in such a way that, for each p in M, the map (a, b) → N given by t ↦ f_{t}(p) is differentiable, and its derivative at a given value of t is, as a vector in T_{f_{t}(p)}N, equal to (∆ f_{t})_{p}. This is usually abbreviated as:

$$\frac{\partial f}{\partial t}=\Delta f.$$

Eells and Sampson introduced the harmonic map heat flow and proved the following fundamental properties:

- Regularity. Any harmonic map heat flow is smooth as a map (a, b) × M → N given by (t, p) ↦ f_{t}(p).

Now suppose that M is a closed manifold and (N, h) is geodesically complete.

- Existence. Given a continuously differentiable map f from M to N, there exists a positive number T and a harmonic map heat flow f_{t} on the interval (0, T) such that f_{t} converges to f in the C^{1} topology as t decreases to 0.
- Uniqueness. If { f_{t} : 0 < t < T } and { f̅ _{t} : 0 < t < T̅ } are two harmonic map heat flows as in the existence theorem, then f_{t} = f̅ _{t} whenever 0 < t < min(T, T̅).

As a consequence of the uniqueness theorem, there exists a maximal harmonic map heat flow with initial data f, meaning that one has a harmonic map heat flow { f_{t} : 0 < t < T } as in the statement of the existence theorem, and it is uniquely defined under the extra criterion that T takes on its maximal possible value, which could be infinite.

=== Eells and Sampson's theorem ===
The primary result of Eells and Sampson's 1964 paper is the following:

Let (M, g) and (N, h) be smooth and closed Riemannian manifolds, and suppose that the sectional curvature of (N, h) is nonpositive. Then for any continuously differentiable map f from M to N, the maximal harmonic map heat flow { f_{t} : 0 < t < T } with initial data f has T = ∞, and as t increases to ∞, the maps f_{t} subsequentially converge in the C^{∞} topology to a harmonic map.

In particular, this shows that, under the assumptions on (M, g) and (N, h), every continuous map is homotopic to a harmonic map. The very existence of a harmonic map in each homotopy class, which is implicitly being asserted, is part of the result. This is proven by constructing a heat equation, and showing that for any map as initial condition, solution that exists for all time, and the solution uniformly subconverges to a harmonic map.

Eells and Sampson's result was adapted by Richard Hamilton to the setting of the Dirichlet boundary value problem, when M is instead compact with nonempty boundary.

Shortly after Eells and Sampson's work, Philip Hartman extended their methods to study uniqueness of harmonic maps within homotopy classes, additionally showing that the convergence in the Eells−Sampson theorem is strong, without the need to select a subsequence. That is, if two maps are initially close, the distance between the corresponding solutions to the heat equation is nonincreasing for all time, thus:

- the set of totally geodesic maps in each homotopy class is path-connected;
- all harmonic maps are energy-minimizing and totally geodesic.

notes that every map from a product $W \times M$ into $N$ is homotopic to a map, such that the map is totally geodesic when restricted to each $M$-fiber.

=== Singularities and weak solutions ===
For many years after Eells and Sampson's work, it was unclear to what extent the sectional curvature assumption on (N, h) was necessary. Following the work of Kung-Ching Chang, Wei-Yue Ding, and Rugang Ye in 1992, it is widely accepted that the maximal time of existence of a harmonic map heat flow cannot "usually" be expected to be infinite. Their results strongly suggest that there are harmonic map heat flows with "finite-time blowup" even when both (M, g) and (N, h) are taken to be the two-dimensional sphere with its standard metric. Since elliptic and parabolic partial differential equations are particularly smooth when the domain is two dimensions, the Chang−Ding−Ye result is considered to be indicative of the general character of the flow.

Modeled upon the fundamental works of Sacks and Uhlenbeck, Michael Struwe considered the case where no geometric assumption on (N, h) is made. In the case that M is two-dimensional, he established the unconditional existence and uniqueness for weak solutions of the harmonic map heat flow. Moreover, he found that his weak solutions are smooth away from finitely many spacetime points at which the energy density concentrates. On microscopic levels, the flow near these points is modeled by a bubble, i.e. a smooth harmonic map from the round 2-sphere into the target. Weiyue Ding and Gang Tian were able to prove the energy quantization at singular times, meaning that the Dirichlet energy of Struwe's weak solution, at a singular time, drops by exactly the sum of the total Dirichlet energies of the bubbles corresponding to singularities at that time.

Struwe was later able to adapt his methods to higher dimensions, in the case that the domain manifold is Euclidean space; he and Yun Mei Chen also considered higher-dimensional closed manifolds. Their results achieved less than in low dimensions, only being able to prove existence of weak solutions which are smooth on open dense subsets.

== The Bochner formula and rigidity ==
The main computational point in the proof of Eells and Sampson's theorem is an adaptation of the Bochner formula to the setting of a harmonic map heat flow { f_{t} : 0 < t < T }. This formula says

$$\Big(\frac{\partial}{\partial t}-\Delta^g\Big)e(f)=-\big|\nabla(df)\big|^2-\big\langle\operatorname{Ric}^g,f^\ast h\big\rangle_g+\operatorname{scal}^g\big(f^\ast\operatorname{Rm}^h\big).$$

This is also of interest in analyzing harmonic maps. Suppose f : M → N is harmonic; any harmonic map can be viewed as a constant-in-t solution of the harmonic map heat flow, and so one gets from the above formula that

$$\Delta^ge(f)=\big|\nabla(df)\big|^2+\big\langle\operatorname{Ric}^g,f^\ast h\big\rangle_g-\operatorname{scal}^g\big(f^\ast\operatorname{Rm}^h\big).$$

If the Ricci curvature of g is positive and the sectional curvature of h is nonpositive, then this implies that ∆e(f) is nonnegative. If M is closed, then multiplication by e(f) and a single integration by parts shows that e(f) must be constant, and hence zero; hence f must itself be constant. Richard Schoen and Shing-Tung Yau noted that this reasoning can be extended to noncompact M by making use of Yau's theorem asserting that nonnegative subharmonic functions which are L^{2}-bounded must be constant. In summary, according to these results, one has:

Let (M, g) and (N, h) be smooth and complete Riemannian manifolds, and let f be a harmonic map from M to N. Suppose that the Ricci curvature of g is positive and the sectional curvature of h is nonpositive.

- If M and N are both closed then f must be constant.
- If N is closed and f has finite Dirichlet energy, then it must be constant.

In combination with the Eells−Sampson theorem, this shows (for instance) that if (M, g) is a closed Riemannian manifold with positive Ricci curvature and (N, h) is a closed Riemannian manifold with nonpositive sectional curvature, then every continuous map from M to N is homotopic to a constant.

The general idea of deforming a general map to a harmonic map, and then showing that any such harmonic map must automatically be of a highly restricted class, has found many applications. For instance, Yum-Tong Siu found an important complex-analytic version of the Bochner formula, asserting that a harmonic map between Kähler manifolds must be holomorphic, provided that the target manifold has appropriately negative curvature. As an application, by making use of the Eells−Sampson existence theorem for harmonic maps, he was able to show that if (M, g) and (N, h) are smooth and closed Kähler manifolds, and if the curvature of (N, h) is appropriately negative, then M and N must be biholomorphic or anti-biholomorphic if they are homotopic to each other; the biholomorphism (or anti-biholomorphism) is precisely the harmonic map produced as the limit of the harmonic map heat flow with initial data given by the homotopy. By an alternative formulation of the same approach, Siu was able to prove a variant of the still-unsolved Hodge conjecture, albeit in the restricted context of negative curvature.

Kevin Corlette found a significant extension of Siu's Bochner formula, and used it to prove new rigidity theorems for lattices in certain Lie groups. Following this, Mikhael Gromov and Richard Schoen extended much of the theory of harmonic maps to allow (N, h) to be replaced by a metric space. By an extension of the Eells−Sampson theorem together with an extension of the Siu–Corlette Bochner formula, they were able to prove new rigidity theorems for lattices.

== Problems and applications ==
- Existence results on harmonic maps between manifolds has consequences for their curvature.
- Once existence is known, how can a harmonic map be constructed explicitly? (One fruitful method uses twistor theory.)
- In theoretical physics, a quantum field theory whose action is given by the Dirichlet energy is known as a sigma model. In such a theory, harmonic maps correspond to instantons.
- One of the original ideas in grid generation methods for computational fluid dynamics and computational physics was to use either conformal or harmonic mapping to generate regular grids.

A map $u: M \rightarrow N$ between Riemannian manifolds is totally geodesic if, whenever $\gamma : (a, b) \rightarrow M$ is a geodesic, the composition $u \circ \gamma$ is a geodesic.

== Harmonic maps between metric spaces ==
The energy integral can be formulated in a weaker setting for functions u : M → N between two metric spaces. The energy integrand is instead a function of the form

$$e_\epsilon(u)(x) = \frac{\int_M d^2(u(x),u(y))\,d\mu^\epsilon_x(y)}{\int_M d^2(x,y)\,d\mu^\epsilon_x(y)}$$

in which μ^{ε}_{x} is a family of measures attached to each point of M.

== See also ==
- Geometric flow
