= Glossary of symplectic geometry =

This is a glossary of properties and concepts in symplectic geometry in mathematics. The terms listed here cover the occurrences of symplectic geometry both in topology as well as in algebraic geometry (over the complex numbers for definiteness). The glossary also includes notions from Hamiltonian geometry, Poisson geometry and geometric quantization.

In addition, this glossary also includes some concepts (e.g., virtual fundamental class) in intersection theory that appear in symplectic geometry as they do not naturally fit into other lists such as the glossary of algebraic geometry.

== A ==
Arnold
Arnold conjecture.
AKSZ

== C ==
coisotropic
completely integrable system

== D ==
Darboux chart
deformation quantization
deformation quantization.
dilating
derived symplectic geometry
Derived algebraic geometry with symplectic structures.

== E ==
Noether
Emmy Noether's theorem

== F ==
Floer
Floer homology
Fukaya
1. Kenji Fukaya.
2. Fukaya category.

== H ==
Hamiltonian

== I ==
integrable system
integrable system

== K ==
Kontsevich formality theorem

== L ==
Lagrangian
3. Lagrangian fibration
4. Lagrangian intersection
Liouville form
The volume form $\omega^n / n!$ on a symplectic manifold $(M, \omega)$ of dimension 2n.

== M ==
Maslov index
(sort of an intersection number defined on Lagrangian Grassmannian.)
moment
Moser's trick

== N ==
Novikov
Novikov ring

== P ==
Poisson
1. Poisson algebra.
2. A Poisson manifold generalizes a symplectic manifold.
3. A Poisson–Lie group, a Poisson manifold that also has a structure of a Lie group.
4. The Poisson sigma-model, a particular two-dimensional Chern–Simons theory.

== Q ==
quantized
1. quantized algebra

== S ==
shifted symplectic structure
A generalization of symplectic structure, defined on derived Artin stacks and characterized by an integer degree; the concept of symplectic structure on smooth algebraic varieties is recovered when the degree is zero.
Spectral invariant
Spectral invariants.
Springer resolution
symplectic action
A Lie group action (or an action of an algebraic group) that preserves the symplectic form that is present.
symplectic reduction
symplectic variety
An algebraic variety with a symplectic form on the smooth locus. The basic example is the cotangent bundle of a smooth algebraic variety.
symplectomorphism
A symplectomorphism is a diffeomorphism preserving the symplectic forms.

== T ==
Thomas–Yau conjecture
see Thomas–Yau conjecture

== V ==
virtual fundamental class
A generalization of the fundamental class concept from manifolds to a wider notion of space in higher geometry, in particular to orbifolds.
