= List of geometers =

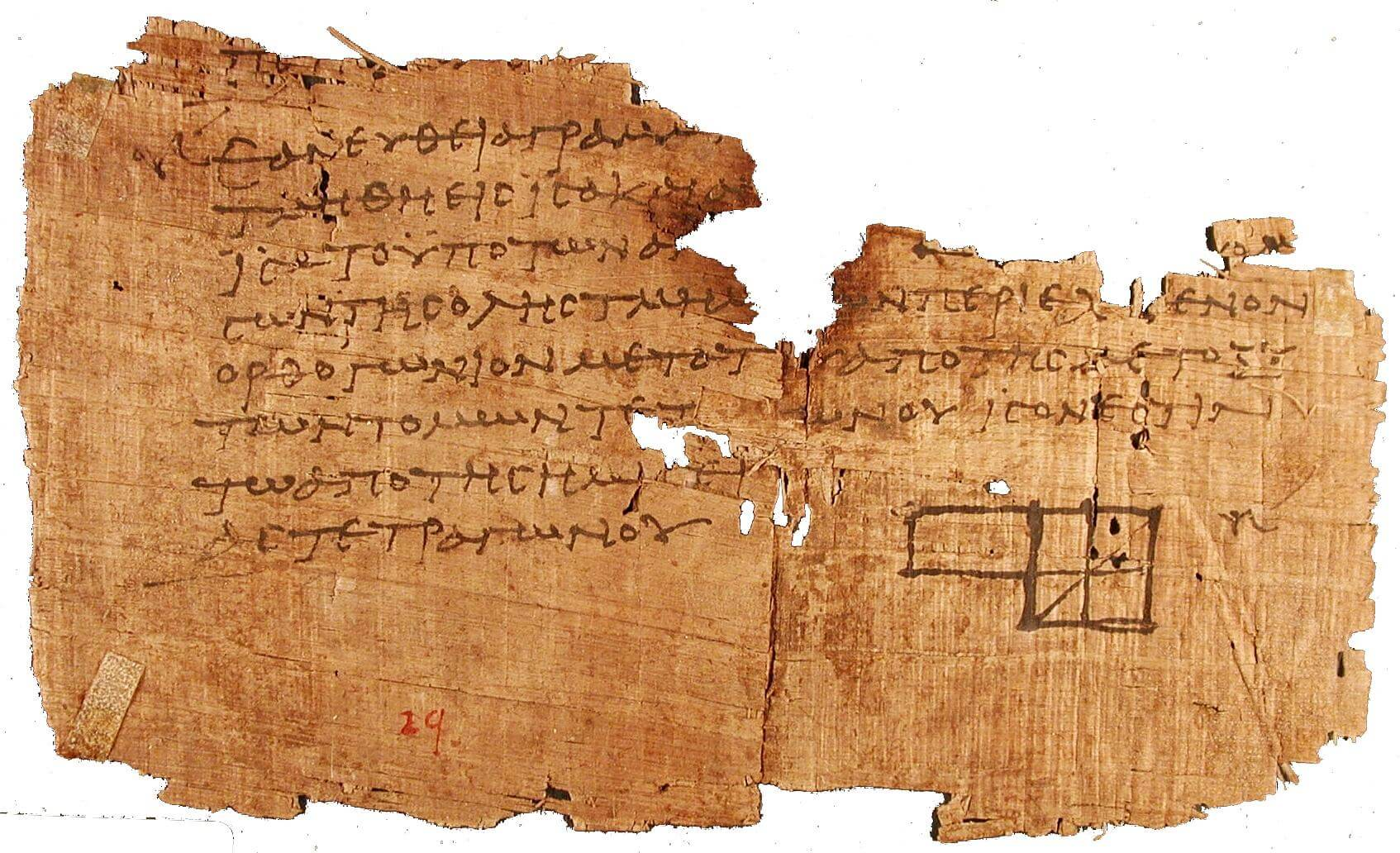
One of the oldest surviving fragments of Euclid's Elements, found at Oxyrhynchus and dated to c. 100 AD (P. Oxy. 29). The diagram accompanies Book II, Proposition 5.

A geometer or geometrician is a mathematician who specializes in geometry.

Some notable geometers and their main fields of work, chronologically listed, are:

== 1000 BC to 1 BC ==
- Baudhayana (fl. c. 800 BC) – Euclidean geometry
- Manava (c. 750 BC–690 BC) – Euclidean geometry
- Thales of Miletus (c. 624 BC – c. 546 BC) – Euclidean geometry
- Pythagoras (c. 570 BC – c. 495 BC) – Euclidean geometry, Pythagorean theorem
- Zeno of Elea (c. 490 BC – c. 430 BC) – Euclidean geometry
- Hippocrates of Chios (born c. 470 – 410 BC) – first systematically organized Stoicheia – Elements (geometry textbook)
- Mozi (c. 468 BC – c. 391 BC)
- Plato (427–347 BC)
- Theaetetus (c. 417 BC – 369 BC)
- Autolycus of Pitane (360–c. 290 BC) – astronomy, spherical geometry
- Euclid (fl. 300 BC) – Elements, Euclidean geometry (sometimes called the "father of geometry")
- Apollonius of Perga (c. 262 BC – c. 190 BC) – Euclidean geometry, conic sections
- Archimedes (c. 287 BC – c. 212 BC) – Euclidean geometry
- Eratosthenes (c. 276 BC – c. 195/194 BC) – Euclidean geometry
- Katyayana (c. 3rd century BC) – Euclidean geometry

== 1–1300 AD ==
- Hero of Alexandria (c. AD 10–70) – Euclidean geometry
- Pappus of Alexandria (c. AD 290–c. 350) – Euclidean geometry, projective geometry
- Hypatia of Alexandria (c. AD 370–c. 415) – Euclidean geometry
- Brahmagupta (597–668) – Euclidean geometry, cyclic quadrilaterals
- Vergilius of Salzburg (c.700–784) – Irish bishop of Aghaboe, Ossory and later Salzburg, Austria; antipodes, and astronomy
- Al-Abbās ibn Said al-Jawharī (c. 800–c. 860)
- Thabit ibn Qurra (826–901) – analytic geometry, non-Euclidean geometry, conic sections
- Abu'l-Wáfa (940–998) – spherical geometry, spherical triangles
- Ibn al-Haytham (965–c. 1040)
- Omar Khayyam (1048–1131) – algebraic geometry, conic sections
- Ibn Maḍāʾ (1116–1196)

== 1301–1800 AD ==
Leonardo da Vinci	Johannes Kepler	Girard Desargues
René Descartes	Blaise Pascal	Isaac Newton
Leonhard Euler	Carl Gauss	August Möbius
Nikolai Lobachevsky	John Playfair	Jakob Steiner

- Piero della Francesca (1415–1492)
- Leonardo da Vinci (1452–1519) – Euclidean geometry
- Jyesthadeva (c. 1500 – c. 1610) – Euclidean geometry, cyclic quadrilaterals
- Marin Getaldić (1568–1626)
- Jacques-François Le Poivre (1652–1710) – projective geometry
- Johannes Kepler (1571–1630) – (used geometric ideas in astronomical work)
- Edmund Gunter (1581–1686)
- Girard Desargues (1591–1661) – projective geometry; Desargues' theorem
- René Descartes (1596–1650) – invented the methodology of analytic geometry, also called Cartesian geometry after him
- Pierre de Fermat (1607–1665) – analytic geometry
- Blaise Pascal (1623–1662) – projective geometry
- Christiaan Huygens (1629–1695) – evolute
- Giordano Vitale (1633–1711)
- Philippe de La Hire (1640–1718) – projective geometry
- Isaac Newton (1642–1727) – 3rd-degree algebraic curve
- Giovanni Ceva (1647–1734) – Euclidean geometry
- Johann Jacob Heber (1666–1727) – surveyor and geometer
- Giovanni Gerolamo Saccheri (1667–1733) – non-Euclidean geometry
- Leonhard Euler (1707–1783)
- Tobias Mayer (1723–1762)
- Johann Heinrich Lambert (1728–1777) – non-Euclidean geometry
- Gaspard Monge (1746–1818) – descriptive geometry
- John Playfair (1748–1819) – Euclidean geometry
- Lazare Nicolas Marguerite Carnot (1753–1823) – projective geometry
- Joseph Diaz Gergonne (1771–1859) – projective geometry; Gergonne point
- Carl Friedrich Gauss (1777–1855) – Theorema Egregium
- Louis Poinsot (1777–1859)
- Siméon Denis Poisson (1781–1840)
- Jean-Victor Poncelet (1788–1867) – projective geometry
- Augustin-Louis Cauchy (1789–1857)
- August Ferdinand Möbius (1790–1868) – Euclidean geometry
- Nikolai Ivanovich Lobachevsky (1792–1856) – hyperbolic geometry, a non-Euclidean geometry
- Michel Chasles (1793–1880) – projective geometry
- Germinal Dandelin (1794–1847) – Dandelin spheres in conic sections
- Jakob Steiner (1796–1863) – champion of synthetic geometry methodology, projective geometry, Euclidean geometry

== 1801–1900 AD ==
Julius Plücker	Arthur Cayley	Bernhard Riemann
Richard Dedekind	Max Noether	Felix Klein
Hermann Minkowski	Henri Poincaré	Evgraf Fedorov

- Karl Wilhelm Feuerbach (1800–1834) – Euclidean geometry
- Julius Plücker (1801–1868)
- János Bolyai (1802–1860) – hyperbolic geometry, a non-Euclidean geometry
- Christian Heinrich von Nagel (1803–1882) – Euclidean geometry
- Johann Benedict Listing (1808–1882) – topology
- Hermann Günther Grassmann (1809–1877) – exterior algebra
- Ludwig Otto Hesse (1811–1874) – algebraic invariants and geometry
- Ludwig Schlafli (1814–1895) – Regular 4-polytope
- Pierre Ossian Bonnet (1819–1892) – differential geometry
- Arthur Cayley (1821–1895)
- Joseph Bertrand (1822–1900)
- Delfino Codazzi (1824–1873) – differential geometry
- Bernhard Riemann (1826–1866) – elliptic geometry (a non-Euclidean geometry) and Riemannian geometry
- Julius Wilhelm Richard Dedekind (1831–1916)
- Ludwig Burmester (1840–1927) – theory of linkages
- Edmund Hess (1843–1903)
- Albert Victor Bäcklund (1845–1922)
- Max Noether (1844–1921) – algebraic geometry
- Henri Brocard (1845–1922) – Brocard points
- William Kingdon Clifford (1845–1879) – geometric algebra
- Pieter Hendrik Schoute (1846–1923)
- Felix Klein (1849–1925)
- Sofia Vasilyevna Kovalevskaya (1850–1891)
- Evgraf Fedorov (1853–1919)
- Henri Poincaré (1854–1912)
- Luigi Bianchi (1856–1928) – differential geometry
- Alicia Boole Stott (1860–1940)
- Hermann Minkowski (1864–1909) – non-Euclidean geometry
- Henry Frederick Baker (1866–1956) – algebraic geometry
- Élie Cartan (1869–1951)
- Dmitri Egorov (1869–1931) – differential geometry
- Veniamin Kagan (1869–1953)
- Raoul Bricard (1870–1944) – descriptive geometry
- Ernst Steinitz (1871–1928) – Steinitz's theorem
- Marcel Grossmann (1878–1936)
- Oswald Veblen (1880–1960) – projective geometry, differential geometry
- Nathan Altshiller Court (1881–1968) – author of College Geometry
- Emmy Noether (1882–1935) – algebraic topology
- Harry Clinton Gossard (1884–1954)
- Arthur Rosenthal (1887–1959)
- Helmut Hasse (1898–1979) – algebraic geometry

== 1901–present ==
H. S. M. Coxeter	Ernst Witt	Benoit Mandelbrot
Branko Grünbaum	Michael Atiyah	J. H. Conway
William Thurston	Mikhail Gromov	George W. Hart
Shing-Tung Yau	Károly Bezdek	Grigori Perelman
Denis Auroux

- William Vallance Douglas Hodge (1903–1975)
- Patrick du Val (1903–1987)
- Beniamino Segre (1903–1977) – combinatorial geometry
- J. C. P. Miller (1906–1981)
- André Weil (1906–1998) – Algebraic geometry
- H. S. M. Coxeter (1907–2003) – theory of polytopes, non-Euclidean geometry, projective geometry
- J. A. Todd (1908–1994)
- Daniel Pedoe (1910–1998)
- Shiing-Shen Chern (1911–2004) – differential geometry
- Ernst Witt (1911–1991)
- Rafael Artzy (1912–2006)
- Aleksandr Danilovich Aleksandrov (1912–1999)
- László Fejes Tóth (1915–2005)
- Edwin Evariste Moise (1918–1998)
- Aleksei Pogorelov (1919–2002) – differential geometry
- Magnus Wenninger (1919–2017) – polyhedron models
- Jean-Louis Koszul (1921–2018)
- Isaak Yaglom (1921–1988)
- Eugenio Calabi (1923–2023)
- Benoit Mandelbrot (1924–2010) – fractal geometry
- Katsumi Nomizu (1924–2008) – affine differential geometry
- Michael S. Longuet-Higgins (1925–2016)
- John Leech (1926–1992)
- Alexander Grothendieck (1928–2014) – algebraic geometry
- Branko Grünbaum (1929–2018) – discrete geometry
- Michael Atiyah (1929–2019)
- Lev Semenovich Pontryagin (1908–1988)
- Geoffrey Colin Shephard (1927–2016)
- Norman W. Johnson (1930–2017)
- John Milnor (1931–)
- Roger Penrose (1931–)
- Yuri Manin (1937–2023) – algebraic geometry and diophantine geometry
- Vladimir Arnold (1937–2010) – algebraic geometry
- Ernest Vinberg (1937–2020)
- J. H. Conway (1937–2020) – sphere packing, recreational geometry
- Robin Hartshorne (1938–) – geometry, algebraic geometry
- Phillip Griffiths (1938–) – algebraic geometry, differential geometry
- Enrico Bombieri (1940–) – algebraic geometry
- Robert Williams (1942–)
- Peter McMullen (1942–)
- Richard S. Hamilton (1943–2024) – differential geometry, Ricci flow, Poincaré conjecture
- Mikhail Gromov (1943–)
- Rudy Rucker (1946–)
- William Thurston (1946–2012)
- Shing-Tung Yau (1949–)
- Michael Freedman (1951–)
- Egon Schulte (1955–) – polytopes
- George W. Hart (1955–) – sculptor
- Károly Bezdek (1955–) – discrete geometry, sphere packing, Euclidean geometry, non-Euclidean geometry
- Simon Donaldson (1957–)
- Kenji Fukaya (1959–) – symplectic geometry
- Yong-Geun Oh (1961–)
- Toshiyuki Kobayashi (1962–)
- Hiraku Nakajima (1962–) – representation theory and geometry
- Hwang Jun-Muk (1963–) – algebraic geometry, differential geometry
- Grigori Perelman (1966–) – Poincaré conjecture
- Maryam Mirzakhani (1977–2017)
- Denis Auroux (1977–)

== Geometers in art ==
God as architect of the world, 1220–1230, from Bible moralisée	Kepler's Platonic solid model of planetary spacing in the Solar System from Mysterium Cosmographicum (1596)	The Ancient of Days, 1794, by William Blake, with the compass as a symbol for divine order	Newton (1795), by William Blake; here, Newton is depicted critically as a "divine geometer".

== See also ==
- Mathematics and architecture
