= Zehnder =

Zehnder is a German-language surname, mostly Swiss in origin:

- Zehnder (surname)

It may also refer to the following:

- Conley–Zehnder theorem, a mathematical theorem named after Charles C. Conley and Eduard Zehnder
- Mach–Zehnder interferometer, a device used in physics
- Egon Zehnder, a global executive search firm based in Switzerland
- Zehnder Confair, American politician
- Zehnder's, a large restaurant in Frankenmuth, Michigan
- W.M. 'Tiny' Zehnder Field, an American airport
