= Eduard Zehnder =

Swiss mathematician (1940–2024)

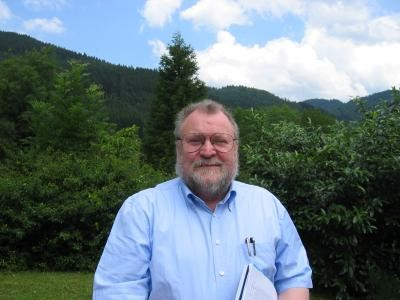
- Zehnder in 2005
- Born: 10 November 1940; Leuggern, Aargau, Switzerland
- Died: 22 November 2024 (aged 84); Greifensee, Zurich, Switzerland
- Education: ETH Zurich
- Known for: Conley–Zehnder theorem Hofer–Zehnder capacity
- Scientific career
- Fields: Mathematics
- Doctoral advisor: Res Jost
- Doctoral students: Andreas Floer

Eduard J. Zehnder (10 November 1940 – 22 November 2024) was a Swiss mathematician, considered one of the founders of symplectic topology.

== Biography ==
Zehnder studied mathematics and physics at ETH Zurich from 1960 to 1965, where he also did his Ph.D. in theoretical physics, defending his thesis on the three-body problem in 1971 under the direction of Res Jost. He was a visiting professor at Courant Institute of Mathematical Sciences (invited by Jürgen Moser), visiting member of Institute for Advanced Study in Princeton from 1972 to 1974. He passed his habilitation in mathematics in 1974 at the University of Erlangen-Nuremberg. He had appointments at the University of Bochum from 1976 to 1986; at the University of Aix-la-Chapelle during the academic year 1987–88, where he was director of the Mathematical Institute. From 1988, he had a chair at ETH Zurich, where he became emeritus in 2006. He was plenary speaker at the International Congress of Mathematicians (ICM) in 1986 at the University of California, Berkeley. In 2012 he became a fellow of the American Mathematical Society. In 2021 he was elected a member of the Academia Europaea.

Zehnder made fundamental contributions to the field of dynamical systems. In particular, in one of his groundbreaking works with Charles C. Conley, he established the celebrated Arnold conjecture for fixed points of Hamiltonian diffeomorphisms, and paved the way for the development of the new field of symplectic topology.

He directed the thesis of several mathematicians. His first student was Andreas Floer, who defended his thesis in 1984.

Zehnder died in Greifensee on 22 November 2024, at the age of 84.

== Major publications ==
Textbooks.

- Jürgen Moser and Eduard J. Zehnder. Notes on dynamical systems. Courant Lecture Notes in Mathematics, 12. New York University, Courant Institute of Mathematical Sciences, New York; American Mathematical Society, Providence, RI, 2005. viii+256 pp. ISBN 0-8218-3577-7
- Eduard Zehnder. Lectures on dynamical systems. Hamiltonian vector fields and symplectic capacities. EMS Textbooks in Mathematics. European Mathematical Society, Zürich, 2010. x+353 pp. ISBN 978-3-03719-081-4
- Helmut Hofer and Eduard Zehnder. Symplectic invariants and Hamiltonian dynamics. Reprint of the 1994 edition. Modern Birkhäuser Classics. Birkhäuser Verlag, Basel, 2011. xiv+341 pp. ISBN 978-3-0348-0103-4

Research articles.

- E. Zehnder. Generalized implicit function theorems with applications to some small divisor problems. I. Comm. Pure Appl. Math. 28 (1975), 91–140.
- H. Amann and E. Zehnder. Nontrivial solutions for a class of nonresonance problems and applications to nonlinear differential equations. Ann. Scuola Norm. Sup. Pisa Cl. Sci. (4) 7 (1980), no. 4, 539–603.
- C.C. Conley and E. Zehnder. The Birkhoff-Lewis fixed point theorem and a conjecture of V.I. Arnolʹd. Invent. Math. 73 (1983), no. 1, 33–49.
- Charles Conley and Eduard Zehnder. Morse-type index theory for flows and periodic solutions for Hamiltonian equations. Comm. Pure Appl. Math. 37 (1984), no. 2, 207–253.
- Dietmar Salamon and Eduard Zehnder. Morse theory for periodic solutions of Hamiltonian systems and the Maslov index. Comm. Pure Appl. Math. 45 (1992), no. 10, 1303–1360.
- H. Hofer, K. Wysocki, and E. Zehnder. The dynamics on three-dimensional strictly convex energy surfaces. Ann. of Math. (2) 148 (1998), no. 1, 197–289.
- F. Bourgeois, Y. Eliashberg, H. Hofer, K. Wysocki, and E. Zehnder. Compactness results in symplectic field theory. Geom. Topol. 7 (2003), 799–888.
