= Nancy Hingston =

American mathematician

- Education: Harvard University
- Known for: Generic existence of infinitely many closed geodesics Proof of the Conley conjecture
- Scientific career
- Fields: Mathematics
- Doctoral advisor: Raoul Bott

Nancy Burgess Hingston is a mathematician working in algebraic topology and differential geometry. She is a professor emerita of mathematics at The College of New Jersey.

== Early life and education ==
Nancy Hingston's father William Hingston was superintendent of the Central Bucks School District in Pennsylvania; her mother was a high school mathematics and computer science teacher. She graduated from the University of Pennsylvania with a double major in mathematics and physics. After a year studying physics as a graduate student, she switched to mathematics, and completed her PhD in 1981 from Harvard University under the supervision of Raoul Bott.

== Career ==
Before joining TCNJ, she taught at the University of Pennsylvania. She has also been a frequent visitor to the Institute for Advanced Study, and has been involved with the Program for Women and Mathematics at the Institute for Advanced Study since its founding in 1994.

== Contributions ==
Nancy Hingston made major contributions in Riemannian geometry and Hamiltonian dynamics, and more specifically in the study of closed geodesics and, more generally, periodic orbits of Hamiltonian systems. In her very first paper, she proved that a generic Riemannian metric on a closed manifold possesses infinitely many closed geodesics. In the 1990s, she proved that the growth rate of closed geodesics in Riemannian 2-spheres is at least the one of prime numbers. In the years 2000s, she proved the long-standing Conley conjecture from symplectic geometry: every Hamiltonian diffeomorphism of a standard symplectic torus of any even dimension possesses infinitely many periodic points (the result was subsequently extended by Viktor Ginzburg to more general symplectic manifolds).

== Recognition ==
Nancy Hingston was an invited speaker at the International Congress of Mathematicians in 2014.

She is a fellow of the American Mathematical Society, for "contributions to differential geometry and the study of closed geodesics."

== Personal ==
Her husband, Jovi Tenev, is a lawyer. She has three children.
