= Kai Cieliebak =

Kai Cieliebak (born March 26, 1966 in Hagen, Germany) is a german Mathematician. He is professor at the University of Augsburg.

== Life ==
Kai Cieliebak received his diploma in 1992 at the Ruhruniversität Bochum under the guidance of Helmut Hofer and subsequently found work at the University Bochum as Wissenschaftlicher Assistent. In 1993 he managed to get an assistant job at the ETH Zürich, where he got his Doctorate in 1996, again under the guidance of Helmut Hofer. He then began working for Harvard University in 1996. In 1997, Kai Cieliebak got a job at the Swiss Bank Corporation, where he worked until 1998, when he switched to IBM. He got an Assistant Professor post at the Stanford University in 1999. He swiched later to the Ludwig-Maximilians-Universität München for a professor job. In 2012 he switched to the University of Augsburg

He is coeditor of the Inventiones Mathematicae and member of the Academia Europaea and was invited to speak at the 2022 International Congress of Mathematicians in 2022.

== Works ==
- with Yakov Eliashberg, From Stein to Weinstein and Back: Symplectic Geometry of Affine Complex Manifolds (Colloquium Publications, Band 59), American Mathematical Society, 2013, ISBN 978-0-8218-8533-8
- with A. Floer, H. Hofer: Symplectic homology II: A General Construction. Math. Z. 218, No. 1, 103–122 (1995).
- with A. Gaio, I. Mundet I Riera, D. Salamon: The symplectic vortex equations and invariants of Hamiltonian group actions. J. Symplectic Geom. 1, No. 3, 543–645 (2002).
- with D. Salamon: Wall crossing for symplectic vortices and quantum cohomology. Math. Ann. 335, No. 1, 133–192 (2006).
- with U. Frauenfelder, G. Paternain: Symplectic topology of Mañé’s critical values. Geom. Topol. 14, No. 3, 1765–1870 (2010).
- with U. Frauenfelder, A. Oancea: Rabinowitz Floer homology and symplectic homology. Ann. Sci. Éc. Norm. Supér. (4) 43, No. 6, 957–1015 (2010).
- with Y. Eliashberg: The topology of rationally and polynomially convex domains. Invent. Math. 199, No. 1, 215–238 (2015).
- with K. Mohnke: Punctured holomorphic curves and Lagrangian embeddings. Invent. Math. 212, No. 1, 213–295 (2018).
- with Yakov Eliasberg, N. Mishachev: Introduction to the h-principle (Second edition), American Mathematical Society, 2013, ISBN 1470461056
