= Dmitri Olegovich Orlov =

Russian mathematician (born 1966)

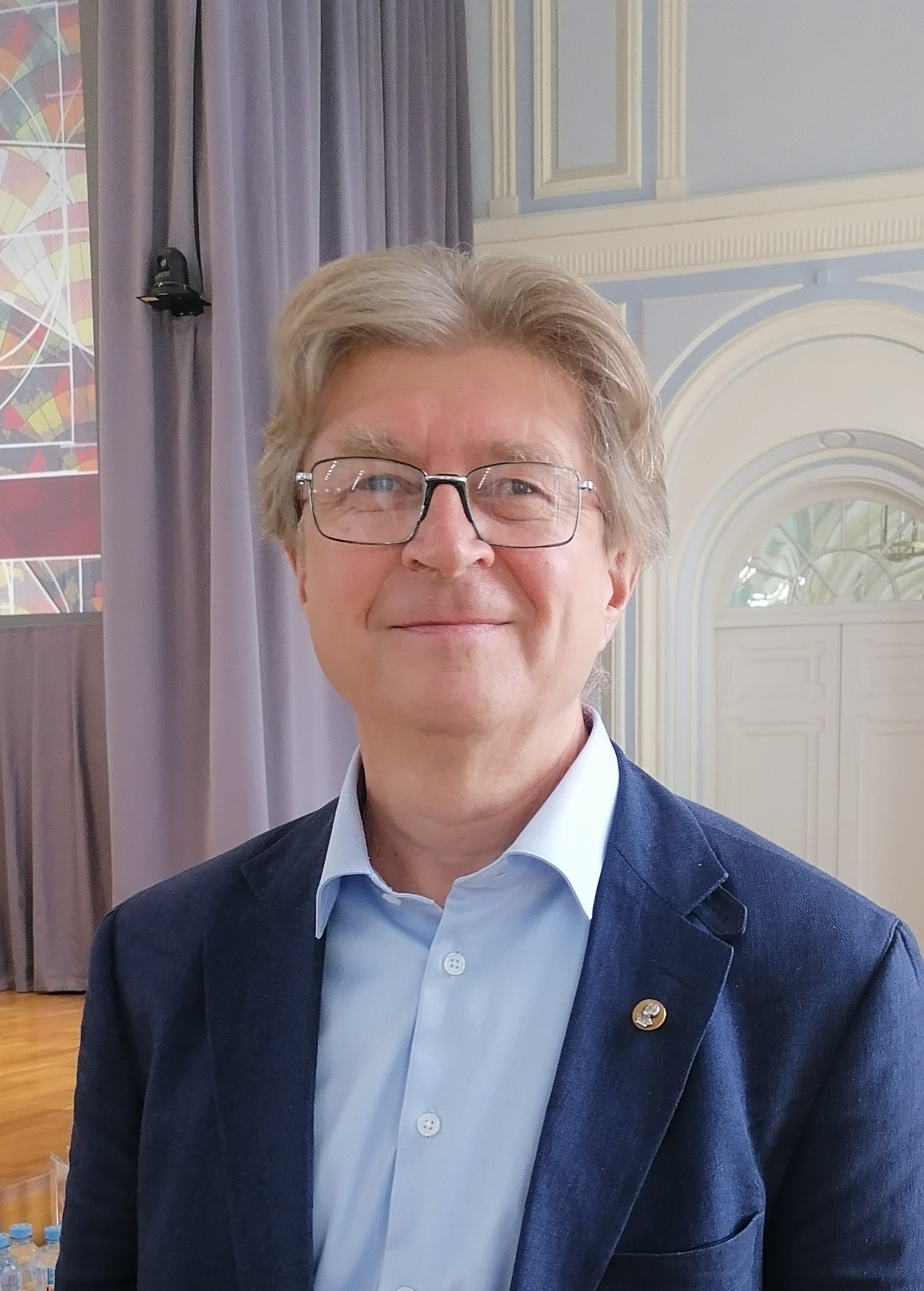
Image of Orlov

Dmitri Olegovich Orlov, (Дмитрий Олегович Орлов, born September 19, 1966, in Vladimir, Russia) is a Russian mathematician, specializing in algebraic geometry. He is known for the Bondal-Orlov reconstruction theorem (2001).

== Education and career ==
In 1988 Orlov graduated from the Faculty of Mechanics and Mathematics of Moscow State University. There he received his Candidate of Sciences degree (PhD) 1991 with thesis Производные категории когерентных пучков, моноидальные преобразования и многообразия Фано (Derived categories of coherent sheaves, monoidal transformations and Fano varieties) under Vasilii Alekseevich Iskovskikh (and Alexey Igorevich Bondal). At the Steklov Institute of Mathematics, Orlov was from April 1996 to April 2011 a researcher in the Algebra Department and is since April 2011 the head of the Algebraic Geometry Department. In 2002 Orlov received his Doctor of Sciences degree (habilitation) with thesis Производные категории когерентных пучков и эквивалентности между ними (Derived categories of coherent sheaves and equivalences between them). In 2002 he was, with A. Bondal, an Invited Speaker with talk Derived categories of coherent sheaves at the International Congress of Mathematicians in Beijing.

Orlov's research deals with homological algebra, (derived categories, triangulated categories), algebraic geometry (derived algebraic geometry, homological mirror symmetry, quasicoherent sheaves, and noncommutative geometry.

Orlov is one of the pioneers of the modern emerging categorical framework which unites the commutative and noncommutative algebraic geometry, via the study of enhanced triangulated categories of quasicoherent sheaves.

He was elected on December 20, 2011, a corresponding member and on 15 November 2019 a full member of the Russian Academy of Sciences.

== Selected publications ==
- Bondal, A.; Orlov, D. (1995). "Semi-orthogonal decomposition for algebraic varieties". arXiv:alg-geom/9506012.
- Bondal, A.; Orlov, D. (2001). "Reconstruction of a variety from the derived category and groups of autoequivalences". Compositio Mathematica. 125 (3): 327–344. arXiv:alg-geom/9712029. doi:10.1023/A:1002470302976.
- Bondal, Alexei; Orlov, Dmitri. "Derived categories of coherent sheaves". Proceedings of the International Congress of Mathematicians (Beijing 2002), Vol. II. pp. 47–56. arXiv:math/0206295.
- Orlov, D. O. (2003). "Quasi-coherent sheaves in commutative and non-commutative geometry". Izvestiya: Mathematics. 67 (3): 535–554. Bibcode:2003IzMat..67..535O. doi:10.1070/IM2003v067n03ABEH000437.
- Orlov, D. O. (2003). "Derived categories of coherent sheaves and equivalences between them". Russian Mathematical Surveys. 58 (3): 511–591. Bibcode:2003RuMaS..58..511O. doi:10.1070/RM2003v058n03ABEH000629.
- Kapustin, A. N.; Orlov, D. (2004). "Lectures on mirror symmetry, derived categories, and D-branes". Russian Mathematical Surveys. 59 (5): 907–940. arXiv:math/0308173. Bibcode:2004RuMaS..59..907K. doi:10.1070/RM2004v059n05ABEH000772.
- Orlov, D. O. (2005). "Derived categories of coherent sheaves and motives". Russian Mathematical Surveys. 60 (6): 1242–1244. arXiv:math/0512620. Bibcode:2005RuMaS..60.1242O. doi:10.1070/RM2005v060n06ABEH004292.
- Efimov, Alexander I.; Lunts, Valery A.; Orlov, Dmitri O. (1 October 2009). "Deformation theory of objects in homotopy and derived categories I: General theory". Advances in Mathematics. 222 (2): 359–401. arXiv:math/0702838. doi:10.1016/j.aim.2009.03.021.
- Efimov, Alexander I.; Lunts, Valery A.; Orlov, Dmitri O. (1 May 2010). "Deformation theory of objects in homotopy and derived categories II: Pro-representability of the deformation functor". Advances in Mathematics. 224 (1): 45–102. arXiv:math/0702839. doi:10.1016/j.aim.2009.11.004.
- Efimov, Alexander I.; Lunts, Valery A.; Orlov, Dmitri O. (20 March 2011). "Deformation theory of objects in homotopy and derived categories III: Abelian categories". Advances in Mathematics. 226 (5): 3857–3911. arXiv:math/0702840. doi:10.1016/j.aim.2010.11.003.
- Lunts, Valery A.; Orlov, Dmitri O. (2010). "Uniqueness of enhancement for triangulated categories". Journal of the American Mathematical Society. 23 (3): 853–908. arXiv:0908.4187. Bibcode:2010JAMS...23..853L. doi:10.1090/S0894-0347-10-00664-8.
- Orlov, Dmitri (2011). "Formal completions and idempotent completions of triangulated categories of singularities". Advances in Mathematics. 226 (1): 206–217. arXiv:0901.1859. doi:10.1016/j.aim.2010.06.016.
- Orlov, Dmitri (2012). "Landau-Ginzburg Models, D-branes, and Mirror Symmetry" (PDF). Matemática Contemporânea. 41 (6): 75–112. arXiv:1111.2962. doi:10.21711/231766362012/rmc416.
- Abouzaid, Mohammed; Auroux, Denis; Efimov, Alexander I.; Katzarkov, Ludmil; Orlov, Dmitri (2013). "Homological mirror symmetry for punctured spheres". Journal of the American Mathematical Society. 26 (4): 1051–1083. arXiv:1103.4322. doi:10.1090/S0894-0347-2013-00770-5.
- Orlov, D. O. (2018). "Derived noncommutative schemes, geometric realizations, and finite dimensional algebras". Russian Mathematical Surveys. 73 (5): 865–918. arXiv:1808.02287. Bibcode:2018RuMaS..73..865O. doi:10.1070/RM9844.
