= Poivre =

Poivre is the French word for pepper. It may also refer to:

Places

- Poivres, a commune in north-central France.
- Poivre Atoll, atoll of Seychelles
- Steak au poivre, a French dish of steak cooked with peppercorns

People

- Jacques-François Le Poivre (1652–1710), Belgian mathematician
- Pierre Poivre, French horticulturalist
- Patrick Poivre d'Arvor, French journalist and writer
