= Andreas Floer =

German mathematician

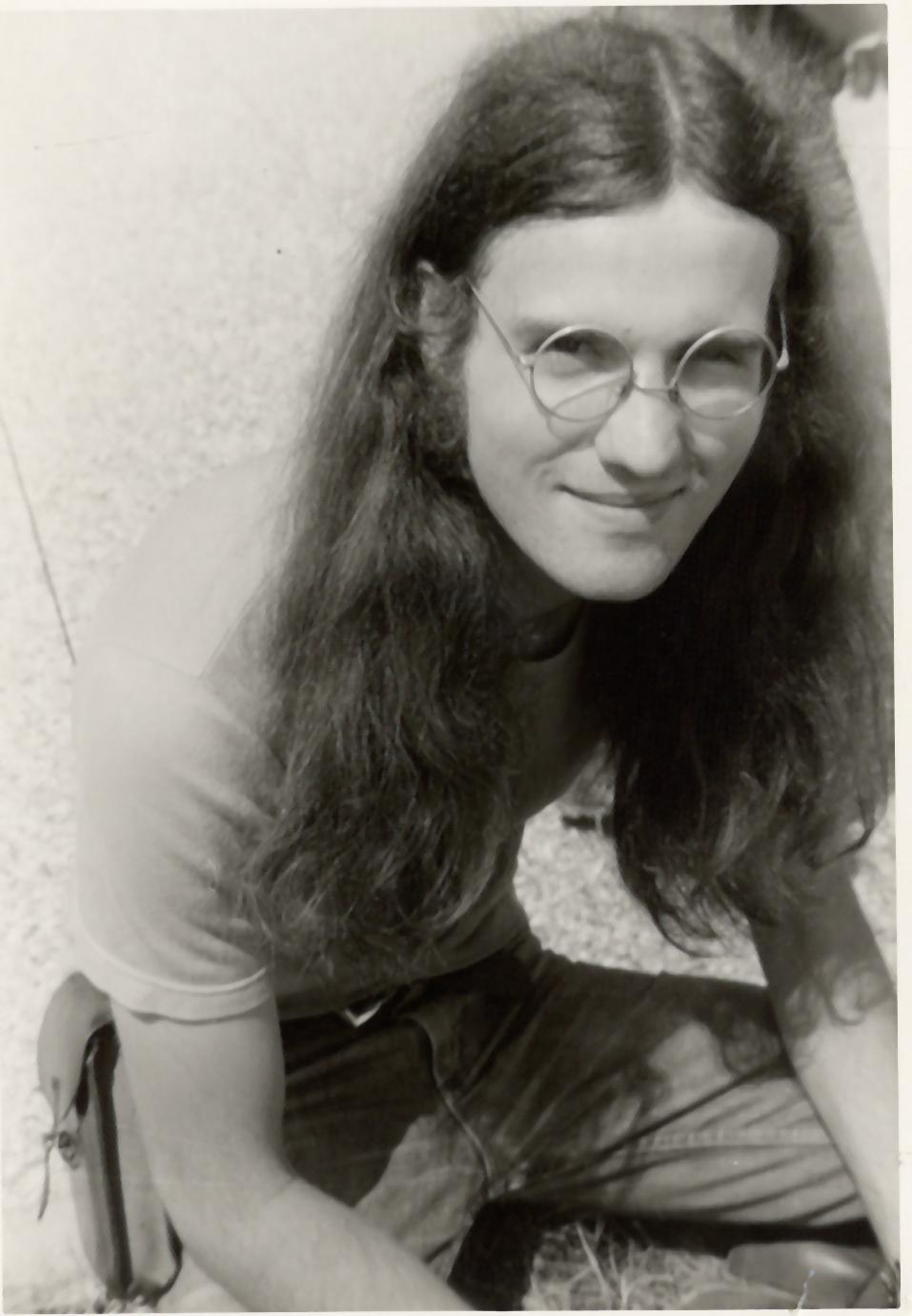
- Andreas Floer in 1975
- Born: August 23, 1956; Duisburg, West Germany
- Died: May 15, 1991 (aged 34)
- Education: Ruhr-Universität Bochum
- Known for: Floer homology Continuation map
- Awards: ICM Speaker (1990)
- Scientific career
- Fields: Mathematics
- Workplaces: Ruhr-Universität Bochum; University of California, Berkeley
- Doctoral advisor: Eduard Zehnder; Ralf Stöcker

Andreas Floer (German: [ˈfløːɐ]; 23 August 1956 – 15 May 1991) was a German mathematician who made seminal contributions to symplectic topology, and mathematical physics, in particular the invention of Floer homology. Floer's first pivotal contribution was a solution to a special case of Arnold's conjecture on fixed points of a symplectomorphism. Because of his work on Arnold's conjecture and his development of instanton homology, he achieved wide recognition and was invited as a plenary speaker for the International Congress of Mathematicians held in Kyoto in August 1990. He received a Sloan Fellowship in 1989.

== Life ==
He was an undergraduate student at the Ruhr-Universität Bochum and received a Diplom in mathematics in 1982. He then went to the University of California, Berkeley, living at Barrington Hall of the Berkeley Student Cooperative, and undertook Ph.D. work on monopoles on 3-manifolds, under the supervision of Clifford Taubes; but he did not complete it when interrupted by his obligatory alternative service in Germany. He received his Dr. rer. nat. at Bochum in 1984, under the supervision of Eduard Zehnder.

In 1988 he became an assistant professor at the University of California, Berkeley and was promoted to full professor of mathematics in 1990. From 1990 he was professor of mathematics at the Ruhr-Universität Bochum, until his suicide in 1991 as a result of depression.

== Quotes ==
"Andreas Floer's life was tragically interrupted, but his mathematical visions and striking contributions have provided powerful methods which are being applied to problems which seemed to be intractable only a few years ago."

Simon Donaldson wrote: "The concept of Floer homology is one of the most striking developments in differential geometry over the past 20 years. ... The ideas have led to great advances in the areas of low-dimensional topology and symplectic geometry and are intimately related to developments in Quantum Field Theory" and "the full richness of Floer's theory is only beginning to be explored".

"Since its introduction by Andreas Floer in the late nineteen eighties, Floer theory has had a tremendous influence on many branches of mathematics including geometry, topology and dynamical systems. The development of new Floer theoretic tools continues at a remarkable pace and underlies many of the recent breakthroughs in these diverse fields."

== See also ==
- Conley–Zehnder theorem

== Selected publications ==
- Floer, Andreas. An instanton-invariant for 3-manifolds. Comm. Math. Phys. 118 (1988), no. 2, 215–240. Project Euclid
- Floer, Andreas. Morse theory for Lagrangian intersections. J. Differential Geom. 28 (1988), no. 3, 513–547.
- Floer, Andreas. Cuplength estimates on Lagrangian intersections. Comm. Pure Appl. Math. 42 (1989), no. 4, 335–356.

== Posthumous publications ==
- Hofer, Helmut. Coherent orientation for periodic orbit problems in symplectic geometry (jointly with A. Floer) Math. Zeit. 212, 13–38, 1993.
- Hofer, Helmut. Symplectic homology I: Open sets in C^n (jointly with A. Floer) Math. Zeit. 215, 37–88, 1994.
- Hofer, Helmut. Applications of symplectic homology I (jointly with A. Floer and K. Wysocki) Math. Zeit. 217, 577–606, 1994.
- Hofer, Helmut. Symplectic homology II: A General Construction (jointly with K. Cieliebak and A. Floer) Math. Zeit. 218, 103–122, 1995.
- Hofer, Helmut. Transversality results in the elliptic Morse theory of the action functional (jointly with A. Floer and D. Salamon) Duke Mathematical Journal, Vol. 80 No. 1, 251–292, 1995. Download from H. Hofer's homepage at NYU
- Hofer, Helmut. Applications of symplectic homology II (jointly with K. Cieliebak, A. Floer and K. Wysocki) Math. Zeit. 223, 27–45, 1996.

== Notes ==
1. Hofer, Weinstein, and Zehnder, Andreas Floer: 1956-1991, Notices Amer. Math. Soc. 38 (8), 910-911
2. Simon Donaldson, Floer Homology Groups in Yang-Mills Theory, With the assistance of M. Furuta and D. Kotschick. Cambridge Tracts in Mathematics, 147. Cambridge University Press, Cambridge, 2002. viii+236 pp. ISBN 0-521-80803-0 (The above citation is from the front flap.)
3. Mathematics: frontiers and perspectives. Edited by V. Arnold, M. Atiyah, P. Lax and B. Mazur. American Mathematical Society, Providence, RI, 2000. xii+459 pp. ISBN 0-8218-2070-2 (Amazon search)
4. From the Press Release to the Workshop New Applications and Generalizations of Floer Theory of the Banff International Research Station (BIRS), May 2007 ()
