= Emmy Murphy =

American mathematician

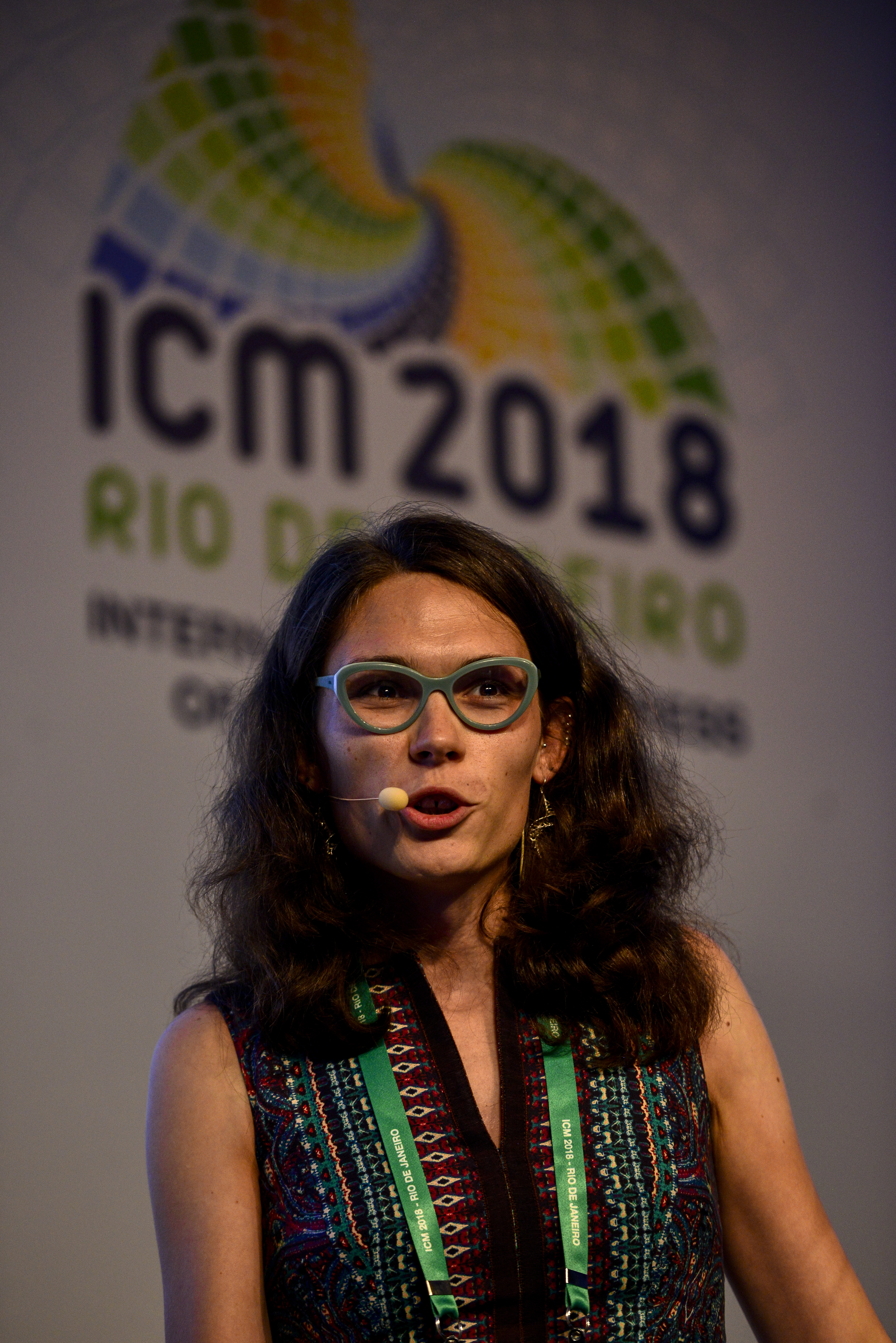
- Murphy at the ICM 2018
- Education: Stanford University
- Known for: symplectic topology, contact geometry and geometric topology
- Scientific career
- Fields: Mathematics
- Workplaces: University of Toronto; Princeton University; Northwestern University; Massachusetts Institute of Technology
- Thesis: Loose Legendrian Embeddings in High Dimensional Contact Manifolds (2012)
- Doctoral advisor: Yakov Eliashberg

Emmy Murphy is an American mathematician and a professor at the University of Toronto Mississauga. Murphy also maintains an office at the Bahen Centre for Information Technology on the St. George campus. Murphy works in the area of symplectic topology, contact geometry and geometric topology.

== Education ==
Murphy graduated from the University of Nevada, Reno in 2007, She completed her doctorate at Stanford University in 2012; her dissertation, Loose Legendrian Embeddings in High Dimensional Contact Manifolds, was supervised by Yakov Eliashberg.

== Career ==
She was a C. L. E. Moore instructor and assistant professor at the Massachusetts Institute of Technology before moving in 2016 to Northwestern University, where she became an associate professor of mathematics. She moved to Princeton University in 2021 as a full professor; and later moved to the University of Toronto in 2023.

Murphy is recognized for her contribution to symplectic and contact geometry. She won the New Horizons in Mathematics Prize in 2020 for "the introduction of notions of loose Legendrian submanifolds", and "overtwisted contact structures in higher dimensions", which is joint work with Matthew Strom Borman and Yakov Eliashberg.

Murphy was invited to the International Congress of Mathematicians in 2018 and she gave a talk related to some results on h-principle phenomena. Apart from using h-principle to study the flexibility of local geometric models, Murphy's work uses cut-and-paste/surgery techniques from smooth topology. She also works on exploring the interaction of symplectic/contact topology with geometric invariants, such as those coming from pseudo-holomorphic curves or constructible sheaves.

Murphy received the grants from National Science Foundation for the period 2019–2022 on the topic "Flexible Stein Manifolds and Fukaya Categories".

== Awards and honors ==
- 2025 Krieger–Nelson Prize.
- Fellow of the American Mathematical Society, in the 2025 class of fellows.
- Von Neumann Fellow, Institute for Advanced Study, 2019–2020.
- New Horizons in Mathematics prize awarded by the Breakthrough Prize Foundation 2020.
- Invited speaker at the 2018 International Congress of Mathematicians.
- Joan & Joseph Birman Research Prize 2017 by the Association for Women in Mathematics.
- AWM Birman Prize 2016 by Royal Academy of Science, Letters and Fine Arts of Belgium.
- Sloan Research Fellowship 2015.
