= Zehnder (surname) =

Zehnder is a German-language surname. Notable people of this surname include the following:

- Alexander Zehnder (born 1946), Swiss microbiologist
- Beat Zehnder (born 1966), Swiss Formula One engineer
- Bruno Zehnder (1945–1997), Swiss penguin photographer
- Cinzia Zehnder (born 1997), Swiss professional association footballer
- Eduard Zehnder, (1940–2024), Swiss mathematician
- Eugen Zehnder (1917–1991), highly decorated German soldier in World War II
- Gina Zehnder (born 1995), Swiss ice dancer
- Gladys Zender (born 1939), Peruvian model, Miss Universe 1957
- Jean-Claude Zehnder (born 1941), Swiss organist and musicologist
- Josef Zehnder (born 1944), Swiss ski jumper
- Kaspar Zehnder (born 1970), Swiss conductor and flautist
- Ludwig Zehnder (1854–1949), Swiss physicist
- Manuela Zehnder (born 1983), Swiss squash player
- Sepp Zehnder (born 1974), Swiss ski jumper
- Silas Zehnder (born 1999), German professional association footballer
- Lucia Näfen-Zehnder (born 1962), Swiss ski mountaineer, long-distance runner and politician

== See also ==
- Zehnder Confair (1906–1982), member of the Pennsylvania State Senate
