= Johann Jacob Heber =

German surveyor and geometrician

Johann Jacob Heber (1666–1727) was a surveyor and geometrician from the city of Lindau, Holy Roman Empire. He is the artist of the first map of the Principality of Liechtenstein on record, which he drew in 1721.

Heber was the son of Jacob Heber and Elisabetha Catharina. He married Elisabetha Barbara Hartenstein, daughter of Philipp Mathias Hartenstein and Eva Katharina Spacke, on 26 January 1797 at Thaleischweiler, Rheinland-Pfalz, Germany.
