= Charles C. Conley =

American mathematician

Charles Cameron Conley (26 September 1933 – 20 November 1984) was an American mathematician who worked on dynamical systems.

The Conley conjecture, Conley index theory, Conley's fundamental theorem of dynamical systems and the Conley–Zehnder theorem are named after him.

== Early life and education ==
Conley was born in Royal Oak, Michigan and graduated from Royal Oak High School in 1949. Starting in 1949, he attended Wayne State University in Detroit for one year before he joined the United States Air Force. After four and a half years in the Air Force, mostly stationed in England, he returned to Wayne State. At Wayne State, he earned a B.S. degree in 1957, where he with the Phi Beta Kappa Key, and an M.S. degree in 1958. He then moved to Boston, where he earned his Ph.D. at the Massachusetts Institute of Technology in 1962 under the supervision of Jürgen Moser.

== Career ==
After a postdoc at New York University's Courant Institute, he took up in 1963 an assistant professor at the University of Wisconsin–Madison, where he was promoted to full professor in 1968.

== Family ==
Charles Conley, who was also known by the nickname Charlie, met his wife, geneticist Catharine "Kit" Smith, in New York while he was a postdoc at the Courant Institute of Mathematical Sciences. The couple married on December 28, 1963. Together, they had three children:

1. Charles Henry Conley, born October 6, 1964
2. Catharine Anastasia Conley, born October 9, 1966
3. John Alan Conley, born October 7, 1968

== Works ==
- Isolated invariant sets and the Morse index. CBMS Regional Conference Series in Mathematics, 38. American Mathematical Society, Providence, Rhode Island, 1978. ISBN 0-8218-1688-8
