= Heinz Hopf Prize =

The Heinz Hopf Prize is awarded every two years at ETH Zurich. The prize honours outstanding scientific work in the field of pure mathematics. It is named after the German mathematician Heinz Hopf (1894–1971), Professor of Mathematics at ETH from 1931 to 1965. The prize is awarded on the occasion of the Heinz Hopf Lectures that are given at ETH by the laureate.

The prize was awarded for the first time in October 2009.

== Laureates ==
Year	Name	Institute	Lectures Title
2009	Robert MacPherson	Institute for Advanced Study, Princeton	How nature tiles space
2011	Michael Rapoport	University of Bonn	How geometry meets arithmetic
2013	Yakov Eliashberg; Helmut Hofer	Stanford University; Institute for Advanced Study, Princeton	From dynamical systems to geometry and back
2015	Claire Voisin	Institut de Mathématiques de Jussieu	Diagonals in algebraic geometry
2017	Richard Schoen	Stanford University	How curvature shapes space
2019	Ehud Hrushovski	University of Oxford	Logic and geometry: the model theory of finite fields and difference fields
2021	Jean-Pierre Demailly	Université Grenoble Alpes	Lectures cancelled
2023	Lai-Sang Young	Courant Institute	What happens when oscillators are disturbed?
2025	Vladimir Sveràk	University of Minnesota	

== See also ==
- List of mathematics awards
