= Eric Katz =

American mathematician

- Born: Cleveland, Ohio
- Education: Ohio State University (BS); Stanford University (PhD)
- Known for: Heron–Rota–Welsh conjecture
- Scientific career
- Fields: Mathematics
- Workplaces: Ohio State University; University of Waterloo
- Thesis: A Formalism for Relative Gromov-Witten Invariants (2004)
- Doctoral advisors: Yakov Eliashberg; Ravi Vakil
- Website: people.math.osu.edu/katz.60/

Eric Katz is a mathematician working in combinatorial algebraic geometry and arithmetic geometry. He is currently a professor in the Department of Mathematics at Ohio State University.

In joint work with Karim Adiprasito and June Huh, he resolved the Heron–Rota–Welsh conjecture on the log-concavity of the characteristic polynomial of matroids. With Joseph Rabinoff and David Zureick-Brown, he has given bounds on rational and torsion points on curves.

== Education ==
Katz went to Beachwood High School, in Beachwood, Ohio, a suburb of Cleveland. After earning a Bachelor of Science in Mathematics from Ohio State University in 1999, he pursued graduate studies at Stanford University, obtaining his Doctor of Philosophy in 2004 with a thesis written under the direction of Yakov Eliashberg and Ravi Vakil.
