= Ailsa Keating =

Mathematician

- Born: Ailsa Macgregor Keating
- Education: Clare College, Cambridge; Massachusetts Institute of Technology
- Awards: Berwick Prize
- Scientific career
- Fields: Mathematics
- Workplaces: Columbia University; Institute for Advanced Study; University of Cambridge
- Thesis: Symplectic properties of Milnor fibres (2014)
- Doctoral advisor: Paul Seidel
- Website: www.dpmms.cam.ac.uk/person/amk50

Ailsa Macgregor Keating is a mathematician specialising in symplectic geometry and homological mirror symmetry. She is a professor in the Department of Pure Mathematics and Mathematical Statistics at the University of Cambridge.

== Education and career ==
Keating grew up in Toulouse, France. She read mathematics in Clare College, Cambridge from 2005 to 2009, earning a master's degree through Part III of the Mathematical Tripos. She went on to graduate study at the Massachusetts Institute of Technology, completing her dissertation in 2014 with the dissertation Symplectic properties of Milnor fibres supervised by Paul Seidel.

She returned to Cambridge as a Junior Research Fellow in Trinity College in 2014, at the same time doing postdoctoral research as a Simons Foundation Junior Fellow at Columbia University and a member of the Institute for Advanced Study. She became a lecturer at Cambridge in 2017 and was promoted to professor in 2023.

== Recognition ==
Keating is the winner of the 2021 Berwick Prize of the London Mathematical Society, for her research using Dehn twists to study the symmetries of symplectic manifolds.
