= Arnold conjecture =

Mathematical conjecture

The Arnold conjecture, named after mathematician Vladimir Arnold, is a mathematical conjecture in the field of symplectic geometry, a branch of differential geometry.

== Strong Arnold conjecture ==
Let $(M, \omega)$ be a closed (compact without boundary) symplectic manifold. For any smooth function $H: M \to {\mathbb R}$, the symplectic form $\omega$ induces a Hamiltonian vector field $X_H$ on $M$ defined by the formula

$$\omega( X_H, \cdot) = dH.$$

The function $H$ is called a Hamiltonian function.

Suppose there is a smooth 1-parameter family of Hamiltonian functions $H_t \in C^\infty(M)$, $t \in [0,1]$. This family induces a 1-parameter family of Hamiltonian vector fields $X_{H_t}$ on $M$. The family of vector fields integrates to a 1-parameter family of diffeomorphisms $\varphi_t: M \to M$. Each individual $\varphi_t$ is a called a Hamiltonian diffeomorphism of $M$.

The strong Arnold conjecture states that the number of fixed points of a Hamiltonian diffeomorphism of $M$ is greater than or equal to the number of critical points of a smooth function on $M$.

== Weak Arnold conjecture ==
Let $(M, \omega)$ be a closed symplectic manifold. A Hamiltonian diffeomorphism $\varphi:M \to M$ is called nondegenerate if its graph intersects the diagonal of $M\times M$ transversely. For nondegenerate Hamiltonian diffeomorphisms, one variant of the Arnold conjecture says that the number of fixed points is at least equal to the minimal number of critical points of a Morse function on $M$, called the Morse number of $M$.

In view of the Morse inequality, the Morse number is greater than or equal to the sum of Betti numbers over a field ${\mathbb F}$, namely $\sum_{i=0}^{2n} \dim H_i (M; {\mathbb F})$. The weak Arnold conjecture says that

$$\# \{ \text{fixed points of } \varphi \} \geq \sum_{i=0}^{2n} \dim H_i (M; {\mathbb F})$$

for $\varphi : M \to M$ a nondegenerate Hamiltonian diffeomorphism.

Kenji Fukaya and Kaoru Ono proved the case $\mathbb F=\mathbb Q$ in 1999. Mohammed Abouzaid and Andrew J. Blumberg proved the case $\mathbb F=\mathbb F_p$ in 2021. Semon Rezchikov, Shaoyun Bai, and Guangbo Xu proved the case $\mathbb F=\mathbb Z$ in 2022.

== Arnold–Givental conjecture ==
The Arnold–Givental conjecture, named after Vladimir Arnold and Alexander Givental, gives a lower bound on the number of intersection points of two Lagrangian submanifolds L and $L'$ in terms of the Betti numbers of $L$, given that $L'$ intersects L transversally and $L'$ is Hamiltonian isotopic to L.

Let $(M, \omega)$ be a compact $2n$-dimensional symplectic manifold, let $L \subset M$ be a compact Lagrangian submanifold of $M$, and let $\tau : M \to M$ be an anti-symplectic involution, that is, a diffeomorphism $\tau : M \to M$ such that $\tau^* \omega = -\omega$ and $\tau^2 = \text{id}_M$, whose fixed point set is $L$.

Let $H_t\in C^\infty(M)$, $t \in [0,1]$ be a smooth family of Hamiltonian functions on $M$. This family generates a 1-parameter family of diffeomorphisms $\varphi_t: M \to M$ by flowing along the Hamiltonian vector field associated to $H_t$. The Arnold–Givental conjecture states that if $\varphi_1(L)$ intersects transversely with $L$, then

$\# (\varphi_1(L) \cap L) \geq \sum_{i=0}^n \dim H_i(L; \mathbb Z / 2 \mathbb Z)$.

=== Status ===
Shaoyun Bai, Egor Shelukhin, Yi Wang, and Guangbo Xu announced a proof of the Arnold–Givental conjecture in August 2026. Before that, it had been proved for several special cases.

- Alexander Givental proved it for $(M, L) = (\mathbb{CP}^n, \mathbb{RP}^n)$.
- Yong-Geun Oh proved it for real forms of compact Hermitian spaces with suitable assumptions on the Maslov indices.
- Lazzarini proved it for negative monotone case under suitable assumptions on the minimal Maslov number.
- Kenji Fukaya, Yong-Geun Oh, Hiroshi Ohta, and Kaoru Ono proved it for $(M, \omega)$ semi-positive.
- Urs Frauenfelder proved it in the case when $(M, \omega)$ is a certain symplectic reduction, using gauged Floer theory.

== See also ==
- Symplectomorphism#Arnold conjecture
- Floer homology
- Spectral invariants
- Conley–Zehnder theorem
