= Math 55 =

Undergraduate math course at Harvard University

Math 55 is a two-semester freshman undergraduate mathematics course at Harvard University founded by Lynn Loomis and Shlomo Sternberg. The official title of the course is Studies in Algebra and Group Theory (Math 55a) and Studies in Real and Complex Analysis (Math 55b). Previously, the official title was Honors Advanced Calculus and Linear Algebra. The course has gained a reputation for its difficulty and accelerated pace.

== Description ==
Formerly, students would begin the year in Math 25 (which was created in 1983 as a lower-level Math 55) and, after three weeks of point-set topology and special topics (for instance, in 1994, p-adic analysis was taught by Wilfried Schmid), students would take a quiz. As of 2012, students may choose to enroll in either Math 25 or Math 55 but are advised to "shop" both courses and have five weeks to decide on one.

Depending on the professor teaching the class, the diagnostic exam may still be given after three weeks to help students with their decision. In 1994, 89 students took the diagnostic exam: students scoring more than 50% on the quiz could enroll in Schmid's Math 55 (15 students), students scoring between 10 and 50% could enroll in Benedict Gross's Math 25: Theoretical Linear Algebra and Real Analysis (55 students), and students scoring less than 10% were advised to enroll in a course such as Math 21: Multivariable Calculus (19 students).

In the past, problem sets were expected to take from 24 to 60 hours per week to complete, although some claim that it is closer to 20 hours. In 2022, on average, students spend a total of 20 to 30 hours per week on the class, including homework. Taking many other challenging courses and extracurricular activities in the same semester is ill-advised.

Students typically typeset their homework in LaTeX and essentially write their own textbook for the class, which ends with a take-home final exam.

=== Historical retention rate ===
Richard Stallman estimated that, in 1970, Math 55 covered almost four years worth of department coursework in two semesters, and thus, it drew only the most diligent of undergraduates. Of the 75 students who enrolled in the 1970 offering, by course end, only 20 remained due to the advanced nature of the material and time-constraints under which students were given to work. David Harbater, a mathematics professor at the University of Pennsylvania and student of the 1974 Math 55 section at Harvard, recalled of his experience, "Seventy [students] started it, 20 finished it, and only 10 understood it." Scott D. Kominers, familiar with the stated attrition rates for the course, decided to keep an informal log of his journey through the 2005 section: "...we had 51 students the first day, 31 students the second day, 24 for the next four days, 23 for two more weeks, and then 21 for the rest of the first semester after the fifth Monday" (the beginning of the fifth week being the drop deadline for students to decide whether to remain in Math 55 or transfer to Math 25).

Numbers of students dropping are due in part to the tendency of undergraduates to "shop around" for appropriate courses at the start of each semester. Even those who passed Advanced Placement Calculus and were contestants in the USA Mathematical Olympiad might feel that Math 55 was too much to handle.

== Course content ==
In short, Math 55 gives a survey of the entire undergraduate curriculum of mathematics in just two semesters and might even include graduate-level topics. Through 2006, the instructor had broad latitude in choosing the content of the course. In the past, Math 55 assumed familiarity with calculus, including partial differentiation, and linear algebra. It offered a rigorous treatment of calculus, finite- and infinite-dimensional vector spaces, ordinary differential equations, Riemann integration in Euclidean spaces (with the Fourier transform in the exercises), tensors, calculus on manifolds, and exterior calculus. Depending on time and the discretion of the instructor, additional topics included the Sturm–Liouville theory, Fourier series, differential geometry, potential theory (with the calculus of residues in the problem set), and classical mechanics (along with the calculus of variations). In 1970, for example, students studied the differential geometry of Banach manifolds in the second semester of Math 55. In contrast, Math 25 Honors Multivariable Calculus and Linear Algebra was more narrowly focused, usually covering real analysis in several variables, the standard topics of linear algebra, tensors, differential forms, manifolds, and the generalized Stokes theorem. Although both were demanding courses that presented calculus from a rigorous point of view and emphasized theory and proof writing, Math 55 was generally faster-paced, more abstract, and demanded a higher level of mathematical sophistication.

Loomis and Sternberg's textbook Advanced Calculus, an abstract treatment of calculus in the setting of normed vector spaces and on differentiable manifolds, was based on the authors' Math 55 syllabus from the 1960s and served for many years as an assigned text. Instructors for Math 55 and Math 25 have also selected Rudin's Principles of Mathematical Analysis, Ahlfors' Complex Analysis, Spivak's Calculus on Manifolds, Axler's Linear Algebra Done Right, Halmos's Naive Set Theory and Finite-Dimensional Vector Spaces, Munkres' Topology, Artin's Algebra, and Serre's Linear Representations of Finite Groups as textbooks or references.

From 2007 onwards, the scope of the course (along with that of Math 25) was changed to more strictly cover the contents of four semester-long courses in two semesters: Math 25a (linear algebra and real analysis) and Math 122 (group theory and vector spaces) in Math 55a; and Math 25b (real analysis) and Math 113 (complex analysis) in Math 55b. The name was also changed to "Honors Abstract Algebra" (Math 55a) and "Honors Real and Complex Analysis" (Math 55b). Fluency in formulating and writing mathematical proofs is listed as a course prerequisite for Math 55, while such experience is considered "helpful" but not required for Math 25. In practice, students of Math 55 have usually had extensive experience in proof writing and abstract mathematics, with many being the past winners of prestigious national or international mathematical Olympiads (such as USAMO or IMO) or attendees of research programs (such as RSI). Typical students of Math 25 have also had previous exposure to proof writing through mathematical contests or university-level mathematics courses.

== Notable alumni ==
Many students who complete the course become professors in quantitative fields. Among those who took Math 55 were UC San Diego mathematician and former Harvard Dean Benedict Gross, Harvard mathematician Joe Harris, Columbia mathematical physicist Peter Woit, Harvard physicist Lisa Randall, Oxford geophysicist Raymond Pierrehumbert, Harvard economists Andrei Shleifer and Eric Maskin, UC Berkeley economist Brad DeLong, and Harvard historian of science Peter Galison. Other alumni of Math 55 include business magnate and computer programmer Bill Gates, computer programmer and free-software promoter Richard Stallman, and television writer and executive producer Al Jean.

== Demographics ==
A 2006 article in The Harvard Crimson reported that only 17 women completed the class between 1990 and 2006, and a 2017 article said that enrollment had been less than 7% female in the previous five years. Math 25 has more women: in 1994–95, Math 55 had no women, while Math 25 had about 10 women in the 55-person course. In 2006, the class was 45% Jewish (5 students), 18% Asian (2 students), 100% male (11 students).

== Instructors ==
- 1973–1974: John N. Mather
- 1981–1982: Andrew Gleason
- 1994–1995: Wilfried Schmid
- 1996–1997: Alexander Polishchuk
- 1997–1999: Pavel Etingof
- 1999–2000: Noam Elkies
- 2000–2001: Wilfried Schmid
- 2002–2003: Noam Elkies
- 2004–2005: Wilfried Schmid
- 2005–2006: Noam Elkies
- 2008–2010: Curtis T. McMullen
- 2010–2011: Noam Elkies
- 2011–2012: Yum-Tong Siu
- 2013–2015: Dennis Gaitsgory
- 2015–2016: Yum-Tong Siu
- 2016–2018: Noam Elkies
- 2018–2020: Joe Harris
- 2020–2022: Denis Auroux
- 2022–2024: Joe Harris
- 2024–2026: Denis Auroux

== See also ==
- Mathematics education in the United States
- William Lowell Putnam Mathematical Competition
- Part III of the Mathematical Tripos
