= Conley index theory =

Theorem in dynamical systems theory

In dynamical systems theory, Conley index theory, named after Charles Conley, analyzes topological structure of invariant sets of diffeomorphisms and of smooth flows. It is a far-reaching generalization of the Hopf index theorem that predicts existence of fixed points of a flow inside a planar region in terms of information about its behavior on the boundary. Conley's theory is related to Morse theory, which describes the topological structure of a closed manifold by means of a nondegenerate gradient vector field. It has an enormous range of applications to the study of dynamics, including existence of periodic orbits in Hamiltonian systems and travelling wave solutions for partial differential equations, structure of global attractors for reaction–diffusion equations and delay differential equations, proof of chaotic behavior in dynamical systems, and bifurcation theory. Conley index theory formed the basis for development of Floer homology.

== Short description ==
A key role in the theory is played by the notions of isolating neighborhood $N$ and isolated invariant set $S$. The Conley index $h(S)$ is the homotopy type of a space built from a certain pair $(N_1,N_2)$ of compact sets called an index pair for $S$. Charles Conley showed that index pairs exist and that the index of $S$ is independent of the choice of the index pair. In the special case of the negative gradient flow of a smooth function, the Conley index of a nondegenerate (Morse) critical point of index $N$ is the pointed homotopy type of the k-sphere S^{k}.

A deep theorem due to Conley asserts continuation invariance: Conley index is invariant under certain deformations of the dynamical system. Computation of the index can, therefore, be reduced to the case of the diffeomorphism or a vector field whose invariant sets are well understood.

If the index is nontrivial then the invariant set S is nonempty. This principle can be amplified to establish existence of fixed points and periodic orbits inside N.

== Construction ==
We build the Conley Index from the concept of an index pair.

Given an isolated invariant set $S$ in a flow $\phi$, an index pair for $S$ is a pair of compact sets $(N_1,N_2)$, with $N_2 \subset N_1$, satisfying

- $S = \text{Inv}(N_1\setminus N_2)$ and $N_1\setminus N_2$ is a neighborhood of $S$;
- For all $x \in N_2$ and $t>0$, $\phi([0,t],x) \subset N_1 \Rightarrow \phi([0,t],x) \subset N_2$;
- For all $x \in N_1$ and $t>0$, $\phi(t,x) \not \in N_1 \Rightarrow \exists t' \in [0,t]$ such that $\phi(t',x) \in N_2$.

Conley shows that every isolating invariant set admits an index pair. For an isolated invariant set $S$, we choose some index pair $(N_1,N_2)$ of $S$ and the we define, then, the homotopy Conley index of $S$ as

$$h(S,\phi) := [(N_1/N_2,[N_2])]$$,

the homotopy type of the quotient space $(N_1/N_2,[N_2])$, seen as a topological pointed space.

Analogously, the (co)homology Conley index of $S$ is the chain complex

$$CH_{\bullet}(S,\phi) = H_{\bullet}(N_1/N_2,[N_2])$$.

We remark that also Conley showed that the Conley index is independent of the choice of an index pair, so that the index is well defined.

== Properties ==
Some of the most important properties of the index are direct consequences of its definition, inheriting properties from homology and homotopy. Some of them include the following:

- If $h(S) \neq 0$, then $S \neq \empty$;
- If $S = \cup_{i=1}^n M_i$, where each $M_i$ is an isolated invariant set, then $CH_k(S) = \oplus_{i=1}^{n} CH_k(M_i)$;
- The Conley index is homotopy invariant.

Notice that a Morse set is an isolated invariant set, so that the Conley index is defined for it.

== See also ==
- Conley's fundamental theorem of dynamical systems
