= Spectral invariants =

In symplectic geometry, the spectral invariants are invariants defined for the group of Hamiltonian diffeomorphisms of a symplectic manifold, which is closed related to Floer theory and Hofer geometry.

== Arnold conjecture and Hamiltonian Floer homology ==
If (M, ω) is a symplectic manifold, then a smooth vector field Y on M is a Hamiltonian vector field if the contraction ω(Y, ·) is an exact 1-form (i.e., the differential of a Hamiltonian function H). A Hamiltonian diffeomorphism of a symplectic manifold (M, ω) is a diffeomorphism Φ of M which is the integral of a smooth path of Hamiltonian vector fields Y_{t}. Vladimir Arnold conjectured that the number of fixed points of a generic Hamiltonian diffeomorphism of a compact symplectic manifold (M, ω) should be bounded from below by some topological constant of M, which is analogous to the Morse inequality. This so-called Arnold conjecture triggered the invention of Hamiltonian Floer homology by Andreas Floer in the 1980s.

Floer's definition adopted Witten's point of view on Morse theory. He considered spaces of contractible loops of M and defined an action functional A_{H} associated to the family of Hamiltonian functions, so that the fixed points of the Hamiltonian diffeomorphism correspond to the critical points of the action functional. Constructing a chain complex similar to the Morse–Smale–Witten complex in Morse theory, Floer managed to define a homology group, which he also showed to be isomorphic to the ordinary homology groups of the manifold M.

The isomorphism between the Floer homology group HF(M) and the ordinary homology groups H(M) is canonical. Therefore, for any "good" Hamiltonian path H_{t}, a homology class α of M can be represented by a cycle in the Floer chain complex, formally a linear combination

$$\alpha_H = a_1x_1 + a_2 x_2 + \cdots$$

where a_{i} are coefficients in some ring and x_{i} are fixed points of the corresponding Hamiltonian diffeomorphism. Formally, the spectral invariants can be defined by the min-max value

$$c_H (\alpha) = \min \max \{ A_H (x_i)\ :\ a_i \neq 0   \}.$$

Here the maximum is taken over all the values of the action functional A_{H} on the fixed points appeared in the linear combination of α_{H}, and the minimum is taken over all Floer cycles that represent the class α.
