= Conley's fundamental theorem of dynamical systems =

Conley's fundamental theorem of dynamical systems or Conley's decomposition theorem states that every flow of a dynamical system with compact phase portrait admits a decomposition into a chain-recurrent part and a gradient-like flow part. Due to the concise yet complete description of many dynamical systems, Conley's theorem is also known as the fundamental theorem of dynamical systems. Conley's fundamental theorem has been extended to systems with non-compact phase portraits and also to hybrid dynamical systems.

== Complete Lyapunov functions ==
Conley's decomposition is characterized by a function known as complete Lyapunov function. Unlike traditional Lyapunov functions that are used to assert the stability of an equilibrium point (or a fixed point) and can be defined only on the basin of attraction of the corresponding attractor, complete Lyapunov functions must be defined on the whole phase-portrait.

In the particular case of an autonomous differential equation defined on a compact set X, a complete Lyapunov function V from X to R is a real-valued function on X satisfying:

- V is non-increasing along all solutions of the differential equation, and
- V is constant on the isolated invariant sets.

Conley's theorem states that a continuous complete Lyapunov function exists for any differential equation on a compact metric space. Similar result hold for discrete-time dynamical systems.

== See also ==
- Conley index theory
