= Fukaya category =

Category of a symplectic manifold

In symplectic topology, a Fukaya category of a symplectic manifold $(X, \omega)$ is a category $\mathcal F (X)$ whose objects are Lagrangian submanifolds of $X$, and morphisms are Lagrangian Floer chain groups: $\mathrm{Hom} (L_0, L_1) = CF (L_0,L_1)$. Its finer structure can be described as an A_{∞}-category.

They are named after Kenji Fukaya who introduced the $A_\infty$ language first in the context of Morse homology, and exist in a number of variants. As Fukaya categories are A_{∞}-categories, they have associated derived categories, which are the subject of the celebrated homological mirror symmetry conjecture of Maxim Kontsevich. This conjecture has now been computationally verified for a number of examples.

== Formal definition ==
Let $(X, \omega)$ be a symplectic manifold. For each pair of Lagrangian submanifolds $L_0, L_1 \subset X$ that intersect transversely, one defines the Floer cochain complex $CF^*(L_0, L_1)$ which is a module generated by intersection points $L_0 \cap L_1$. The Floer cochain complex is viewed as the set of morphisms from $L_0$ to $L_1$. The Fukaya category is an $A_\infty$ category, meaning that besides ordinary compositions, there are higher composition maps

$$\mu_d: CF^* (L_{d-1}, L_d) \otimes CF^* (L_{d-2}, L_{d-1})\otimes \cdots \otimes CF^*( L_1, L_2) \otimes CF^* (L_0, L_1) \to CF^* ( L_0, L_d).$$

It is defined as follows. Choose a compatible almost complex structure $J$ on the symplectic manifold $(X, \omega)$. For generators $p_{d-1, d} \in CF^*(L_{d-1},L_d), \ldots, p_{0, 1} \in CF^*(L_0,L_1)$ and $q_{0, d} \in CF^*(L_0,L_d)$ of the cochain complexes, the moduli space of $J$-holomorphic polygons with $d+ 1$ faces with each face mapped into $L_0, L_1, \ldots, L_d$ has a count

$$n(p_{d-1, d}, \ldots, p_{0, 1}; q_{0, d})$$

in the coefficient ring. Then define

$$\mu_d ( p_{d-1, d}, \ldots, p_{0, 1} ) = \sum_{q_{0, d} \in L_0 \cap L_d} n(p_{d-1, d}, \ldots, p_{0, 1}) \cdot q_{0, d} \in CF^*(L_0, L_d)$$

and extend $\mu_d$ in a multilinear way.

The sequence of higher compositions $\mu_1, \mu_2, \ldots,$ satisfy the $A_\infty$ relations because the boundaries of various moduli spaces of holomorphic polygons correspond to configurations of degenerate polygons.

This definition of Fukaya category for a general (compact) symplectic manifold has never been rigorously given. The main challenge is the transversality issue, which is essential in defining the counting of holomorphic disks.

== See also ==
- Homotopy associative algebra

== Bibliography ==
- Denis Auroux, A beginner's introduction to Fukaya categories.
- Paul Seidel, Fukaya categories and Picard-Lefschetz theory. Zurich lectures in Advanced Mathematics
- Fukaya, Kenji; Oh, Yong-Geun; Ohta, Hiroshi; Ono, Kaoru (2009), Lagrangian intersection Floer theory: anomaly and obstruction. Part I, AMS/IP Studies in Advanced Mathematics, vol. 46, American Mathematical Society, Providence, RI; International Press, Somerville, MA, ISBN 978-0-8218-4836-4, MR 2553465
- Fukaya, Kenji; Oh, Yong-Geun; Ohta, Hiroshi; Ono, Kaoru (2009), Lagrangian intersection Floer theory: anomaly and obstruction. Part II, AMS/IP Studies in Advanced Mathematics, vol. 46, American Mathematical Society, Providence, RI; International Press, Somerville, MA, ISBN 978-0-8218-4837-1, MR 2548482
