= Conley–Zehnder theorem =

In mathematics, the Conley–Zehnder theorem, named after Charles C. Conley and Eduard Zehnder, provides a lower bound for the number of fixed points of Hamiltonian diffeomorphisms of standard symplectic tori in terms of the topology of the underlying tori. The lower bound is one plus the cup-length of the torus (thus 2n+1, where 2n is the dimension of the considered torus), and it can be strengthen to the rank of the homology of the torus (which is 2^{2n}) provided all the fixed points are non-degenerate, this latter condition being generic in the C^{1}-topology.

The theorem was conjectured by Vladimir Arnold, and it was known as the Arnold conjecture on fixed points of symplectomorphisms. Its validity was later extended to more general closed symplectic manifolds by Andreas Floer and several others.
