= Viktor Ginzburg =

Russian-American mathematician

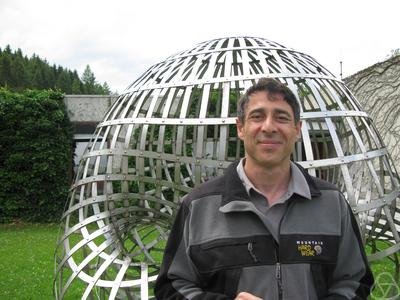
- Viktor Ginzburg at Oberwolfach in 2008
- Born: 1962 (age 63–64)
- Education: University of California, Berkeley
- Known for: Proof of the Conley conjecture Counter-example to the Hamiltonian Seifert conjecture
- Scientific career
- Fields: Mathematics
- Workplaces: University of California, Santa Cruz
- Doctoral advisor: Alan Weinstein

Viktor L. Ginzburg is a Russian-American mathematician who has worked on Hamiltonian dynamics and symplectic and Poisson geometry. As of 2017, Ginzburg is Professor of Mathematics at the University of California, Santa Cruz.

== Education ==
Ginzburg completed his Ph.D. at the University of California, Berkeley in 1990; his dissertation, On closed characteristics of 2-forms, was written under the supervision of Alan Weinstein.

== Research ==
Ginzburg is best known for his work on the Conley conjecture, which asserts the existence of infinitely many periodic points for Hamiltonian diffeomorphisms in many cases, and for his counterexample (joint with Başak Gürel) to the Hamiltonian Seifert conjecture which constructs a Hamiltonian with an energy level with no periodic trajectories.

Some of his other works concern coisotropic intersection theory, and Poisson–Lie groups.

== Awards ==
Ginzburg was elected as a Fellow of the American Mathematical Society in the 2020 Class, for "contributions to Hamiltonian dynamical systems and symplectic topology and in particular studies into the existence and non-existence of periodic orbits".
