= Mohammed Abouzaid =

Mathematician

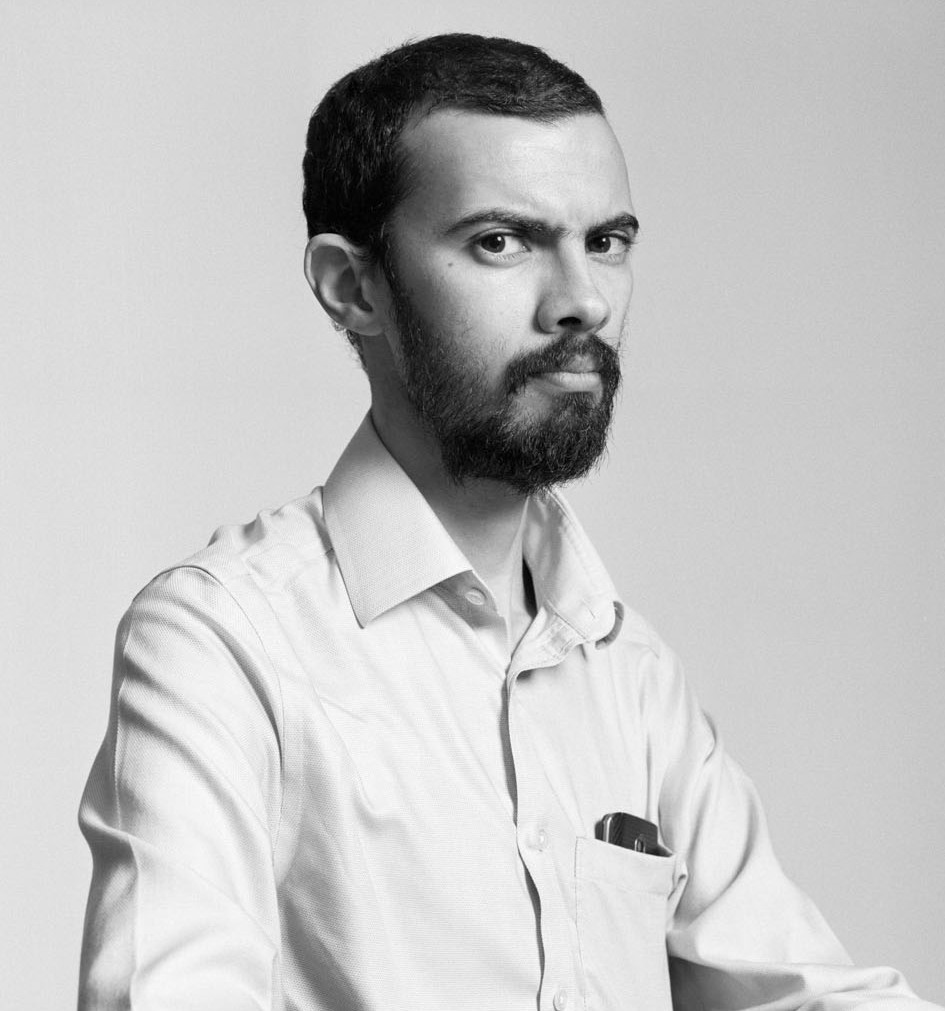
- Born: 1981 (age 44–45); Morocco
- Title: Professor of Mathematics
- Awards: Clay Research Fellow (2007); New Horizons in Mathematics Prize (2017); Fellow of the American Mathematical Society (2018)

Academic background
- Education: University of Chicago
- Thesis: Homological Mirror Symmetry for Toric Varieties (2007)
- Doctoral advisor: Paul Seidel

Academic work
- Discipline: Mathematics
- Institutions: Stanford University 2023-present
- Main interests: Symplectic manifolds
- Website: mathematics.stanford.edu/people/mohammed-abouzaid

Mohammed Abouzaid (Arabic: محمد أبوزيد; born 1981) is a Moroccan mathematician working in symplectic topology. He is a professor at Stanford University. He obtained his PhD in 2007 at the University of Chicago under Paul Seidel's supervision.

== Education and career ==
Mohammed Abouzaid was born in 1981. In 2007, he received his PhD under the supervision of Paul Seidel from the University of Chicago with thesis Homological Mirror Symmetry for Toric Varieties. As a postdoctoral researcher, he was a Clay Mathematics Institute Research Fellow from 2007 to 2012, concurrently, he was also a postdoctoral fellow at Massachusetts Institute of Technology. From 2012 to 2013, he was a visiting professor at the Simons Center for Geometry and Physics. From 2012 to 2023, he was an associate professor at Columbia University. Since 2023 he has been Professor of Mathematics at Stanford University.

As of 2026, he supervised 7 PhD students.

== Awards and honors ==
Abouzaid was an invited speaker the International Congress of Mathematicians in 2014. In 2017, he won the New Horizons in Mathematics Prize "For distinguishing cotangent bundles of exotic spheres, constructing the wrapped Fukaya category with Paul Seidel, and other decisive contributions to symplectic topology and mirror symmetry." In 2018 he became a fellow of the American Mathematical Society.

== Selected publications ==
- Abouzaid, Mohammed (2009). "Morse homology, tropical geometry, and homological mirror symmetry for toric varieties". Selecta Mathematica. 15 (2): 189–270. arXiv:math/0610004. doi:10.1007/s00029-009-0492-2. ISSN 1420-9020.
- Abouzaid, Mohammed; Seidel, Paul (2010). "An open string analogue of Viterbo functoriality". Geometry & Topology. 14 (2): 627–718. arXiv:0712.3177. doi:10.2140/gt.2010.14.627. ISSN 1364-0380.
- Abouzaid, Mohammed (2010). "A geometric criterion for generating the Fukaya category". Publications mathématiques de l'IHÉS. 112 (1): 191–240. arXiv:1001.4593. doi:10.1007/s10240-010-0028-5. ISSN 1618-1913.
- Abouzaid, Mohammed (2012). "Nearby Lagrangians with vanishing Maslov class are homotopy equivalent". Inventiones mathematicae. 189 (2): 251–313. arXiv:1005.0358. doi:10.1007/s00222-011-0365-0. ISSN 1432-1297.
- Abouzaid, Mohammed (2012). "On the wrapped Fukaya category and based loops". Journal of Symplectic Geometry. 10 (1). ISSN 1527-5256. Archived from the original on 2025-09-15.
- Abouzaid, Mohammed; Auroux, Denis; Efimov, Alexander I.; Katzarkov, Ludmil; Orlov, Dmitri (2013). "Homological Mirror Symmetry for Punctured Spheres". Journal of the American Mathematical Society. 26 (4): 1051–1083. arXiv:1103.4322. ISSN 0894-0347. JSTOR 43302831.
- Abouzaid, Mohammed; Auroux, Denis; Katzarkov, Ludmil (2016). "Lagrangian fibrations on blowups of toric varieties and mirror symmetry for hypersurfaces". Publications mathématiques de l'IHÉS. 123 (1): 199–282. arXiv:1205.0053. doi:10.1007/s10240-016-0081-9. ISSN 1618-1913.
- Abouzaid, Mohammed; Courte, Sylvain; Guillermou, Stéphane; Kragh, Thomas (2025). "Twisted generating functions and the nearby Lagrangian conjecture". Duke Mathematical Journal. 174 (5). arXiv:2011.13178. doi:10.1215/00127094-2024-0052.short. ISSN 0012-7094. Archived from the original on 2025-07-31.
