= Conley conjecture =

Mathematical conjecture

In mathematics, the Conley conjecture, named after mathematician Charles Conley, is a conjecture in the field of symplectic geometry, a branch of differential geometry.

== Background ==
Let $(M, \omega)$ be a compact symplectic manifold. A vector field $V$ on $M$ is called a Hamiltonian vector field if the 1-form $\omega( V, \cdot)$ is exact (i.e., equals to the differential of a function $H$. A Hamiltonian diffeomorphism $\phi: M \to M$ is the integration of a 1-parameter family of Hamiltonian vector fields $V_t, t \in [0, 1]$.

In dynamical systems, one would like to understand the distribution of fixed points or periodic points. A periodic point of a Hamiltonian diffeomorphism $\phi$ (of period $k$) is a point $x \in M$ such that $\phi^k(x) = x$. A feature of Hamiltonian dynamics is that Hamiltonian diffeomorphisms tend to have infinitely many periodic points. Conley first made such a conjecture for the case that $M$ is a torus. (Note: Charles Conley, Lecture at University of Wisconsin, April 6, 1984.)

The Conley conjecture is false in many simple cases. For example, a rotation of a round sphere $S^2$ by an angle equal to an irrational multiple of $\pi$, which is a Hamiltonian diffeomorphism, has only 2 geometrically different periodic points. On the other hand, it has been proved for various types of symplectic manifolds.

== History of studies ==
The Conley conjecture was proved by Franks and Handel for surfaces with positive genus. The case of higher dimensional torus was proved by Hingston. Hingston's proof inspired the proof of Ginzburg of the Conley conjecture for symplectically aspherical manifolds. Later, Ginzburg--Gurel and Hein proved the Conley conjecture for manifolds whose first Chern class vanishes on spherical classes. Finally, Ginzburg--Gurel proved the Conley conjecture for negatively monotone symplectic manifolds.
