= Kaoru Ono =

Japanese mathematician (born 1962)

Kaoru Ono (小野 薫, Ono Kaoru, born 1962) is a Japanese mathematician, specializing in symplectic geometry. He is a professor at the Research Institute for Mathematical Sciences (RIMS) at Kyoto University.

Ono received from the University of Tokyo his undergraduate degree in 1984, his master's degree in 1987, and his Ph.D. in 1990. Within symplectic geometry, his research has focused on Floer theory and holomorphic symplectic geometry involving holomorphic curves and pseudoholomorphic curves and their applications. He has collaborated extensively with Kenji Fukaya, Yong-Geun Oh, and Hiroshi Ohta (see Fukaya category).

In a joint work with K. Fukaya, he constructed Floer cohomology of Hamiltonian diffeomorphisms on arbitrary closed symplectic manifolds as well as Gromov-Witten invariants. Using Novikov-Floer cohomology, he proved the $C^1$-flux conjecture. In recent years, he has been collaborating with Fukaya, Oh and Ohta in Floer theory for Lagrangian submanifolds and its implications in symplectic geometry and homological mirror symmetry.

Ono was awarded by the Mathematical Society of Japan in 1999 the Geometry Prize and in 2005 the Autumn Prize. He was a 2006 recipient of the Inoue Prize of the Inoue Foundation for Science. In 2006 he was an Invited Speaker with talk Development in symplectic Floer theory at the International Congress of Mathematicians in Madrid.

In 2022, he serves as Director of the Research Institute for Mathematical Sciences of Kyoto University (KURIMS).

== Selected publications ==
- On the Arnold conjecture for weakly monotone symplectic manifold, Vol. 119, 1995, pp. 519–537 doi:10.1007/BF01245191
- with Fukaya: Arnold conjecture and Gromov-Witten invariant, Topology, Vol. 38, 1999, pp. 933–1048
- with Fukaya: Arnold conjecture and Gromov-Witten invariant for general symplectic manifolds. The Arnoldfest: Proceedings of a Conference in Honour of V.I. Arnold for his Sixtieth Birthday (Toronto, 1997), 1999, pp. 173–190
- Development in symplectic Floer theory, International Congress of Mathematicians, 2006, Proc. ICM Madrid, Volume 2, 1061–1082
- with Fukaya, Oh, & Ohta: Lagrangian Intersection Floer Theory . AMS/IP Studies in Advanced Mathematics, 20
  - Fukaya, Kenji (2010). Lagrangian Intersection Floer Theory: Anomaly and Obstruction, Part I. American Mathematical Soc. ISBN 9780821852491.
  - Fukaya, Kenji; Oh, Yong-Geun; Ohta, Hiroshi; Ono, Kaoru (2010). Lagrangian Intersection Floer Theory: Anomaly and Obstruction, Part II. American Mathematical Soc. ISBN 9780821852507.
- with Fukaya, Oh, & Ohta: "Technical details on Kuranishi structure and virtual fundamental chain." arXiv preprint arXiv:1209.4410, 2012
- Fukaya, Kenji; Oh, Yong-Geun; Ohta, Hiroshi; Ono, Kaoru (2020). Kuranishi Structures and Virtual Fundamental Chains (Springer Monographs in Mathematics). Springer. pp. XV, 638. doi:10.1007/978-981-15-5562-6. ISBN 978-9811555619. S2CID 234938865.
