= Isolating neighborhood =

In the theory of dynamical systems, an isolating neighborhood is a compact set in the phase space of an invertible dynamical system with the property that any orbit contained entirely in the set belongs to its interior. This is a basic notion in the Conley index theory. Its variant for non-invertible systems is used in formulating a precise mathematical definition of an attractor.

== Definition ==
=== Conley index theory ===
Let X be the phase space of an invertible discrete or continuous dynamical system with evolution operator

$$F_t: X\to X, \quad t\in\mathbb{Z}, \mathbb{R}.$$

A compact subset N is called an isolating neighborhood if

$$\operatorname{Inv}(N,F):=\{x\in N: F_t(x)\in N{\ }\text{for all }t\} \subseteq \operatorname{Int}\, N,$$

where Int N is the interior of N. The set Inv(N,F) consists of all points whose trajectory remains in N for all positive and negative times. A set S is an isolated (or locally maximal) invariant set if S = Inv(N, F) for some isolating neighborhood N.

=== Milnor's definition of attractor ===
Let

$$f: X\to X$$

be a (non-invertible) discrete dynamical system. A compact invariant set A is called isolated, with (forward) isolating neighborhood N if A is the intersection of forward images of N and moreover, A is contained in the interior of N:

$$A=\bigcap_{n\geq 0}f^{n}(N), \quad A\subseteq\operatorname{Int}\, N.$$

It is not assumed that the set N is either invariant or open.

== See also ==
- Limit set
