= W.M. 'Tiny' Zehnder Field =

Public use airport in Frankenmuth, Michigan

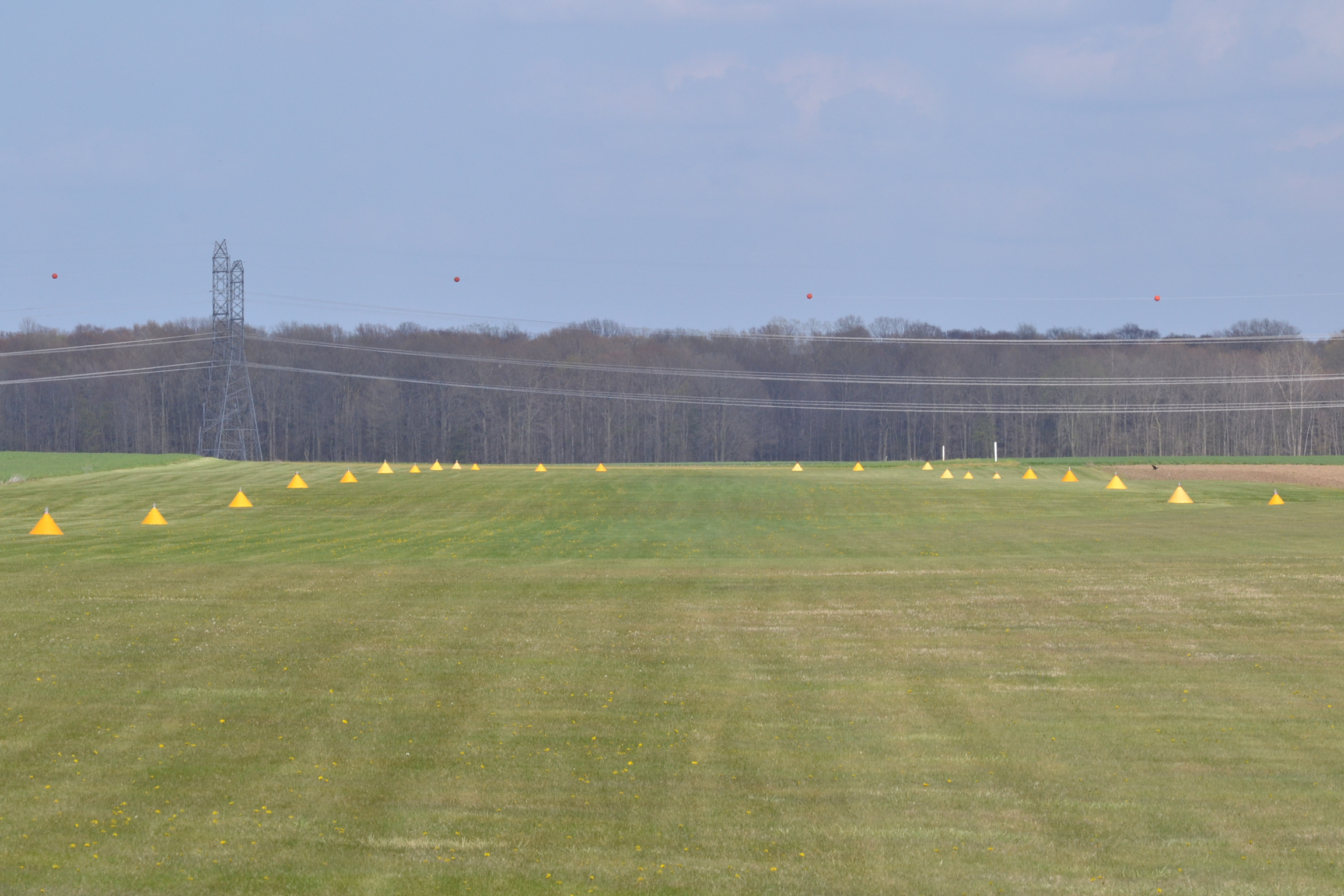
- Runway 09 at 66G
- IATA: none; ICAO: none; FAA LID: 66G

Summary
- Serves: Frankenmuth, Michigan
- Time zone: UTC−05:00 (-5)
  - Summer (DST): UTC−04:00 (-4)
- Elevation AMSL: 639 ft / 195 m
- Coordinates: 43°18′52″N 083°42′36″W
- Interactive map of W.M. 'Tiny' Zehnder Field

Runways
Direction	Length		Surface
Direction	ft	m	Surface
9/27	2,500	762	Turf

Statistics (2021)
- Aircraft movements: 6968

W.M. 'Tiny' Zehnder Field Airport (FAA LID: 66G) is a privately owned, public use airport located 2 miles southeast of Frankenmuth, Michigan, United States. The airport sits on 20 acres at an elevation of 639 feet.

== Facilities and aircraft ==
The airport has one runway, designated as Runway 9/27. It measures 2500 x 100 ft (762 x 30 m) and is made of turf. For the 12-month period ending December 31, 2021, the airport averages 6968 aircraft operations per year, an average of 134 per week. These movements consist entirely of general aviation. For the same time period, 34 aircraft were based at the airport, all airplanes: 33 single-engine and 1 multi-engine.

The airport does not have a fixed-base operator, and no fuel is available.

== Accidents and incidents ==
- On May 20, 2012, a Piper PA-28 Cherokee collided with the terrain shortly after takeoff from the 'Tiny' Zehnder Field. The engine performed normally during a pre-takeoff runup. The pilot stayed in ground effect on takeoff until reaching the best angle of climb speed, the climbed out at the best rate of climb speed. A few seconds after departing ground effect, the pilot reported the plane wasn't climbing "strongly," and there was a “dramatic” decrease in the airplane's rate of climb. The engine's power output began to diminish, and the aircraft's wings began to stall. The aircraft began to sink rapidly; the pilot reduced the engine power to idle, extended 25 degrees of flaps, and applied back pressure on the control yoke to lessen the impact. The airplane impacted the terrain and cartwheeled prior to coming to rest inverted. The cause of the partial loss of engine power could not be determined.
- On August 10, 2013, a Stolp Starduster Too was damaged during landing at the 'Tiny' Zehnder Field Airport. The aircraft experienced a gust of wind on the landing rollout. The pilot attempted to counteract it, but the airplane veered to the right and exited the runway. The probable cause of the accident was found to be the pilot's loss of directional control during the landing roll, which resulted in a runway excursion and subsequent impact with a corn field.
- On September 18, 2013, a Piper PA-28 was substantially damaged during a forced landing after departing the 'Tiny' Zehnder Field Airport. The pilot reported there was an intermittent loss of engine power during initial takeoff climb. The pilot initiated a turn back towards the airport, during which time the engine continued to run intermittently. The pilot attempted to troubleshoot while circling for a runway at the airport, but he decided it would be safer to land in a nearby field. The probable cause of the accident was found to be an intermittent loss of engine power for reasons that could not be determined. Post-accident examinations revealed no anomalies that would have precluded normal operation.
- On July 3, 2016, a small aircraft, either a Piper PA-22 or an Aeronca 11AC, crashed while practicing touch-and-gos at the airport. The pilot was holding a birthday get-together at the time of the accident. Witnesses reported the aircraft entered a right bank, then descended and impacted terrain.
- On August 16, 2020, an Aerotechnik L-13SEH Vivat crashed while attempting to take off from Zehnder Field. The pilot failed to stow the speed break after his previous landing, and the aircraft could not climb out of ground effect on the subsequent takeoff. The aircraft overshot the end of the runway and impacted terrain.
- On November 7, 2021, a Beech G36 Bonanza crashed while attempting to land at the Tiny Zehnder Field airport. After making two low passes over the airport, the aircraft entered the traffic pattern. After touchdown, it started to slide off the runway. The pilot attempted to correct with the rudder, but the aircraft continued to slide. A police officer called to the scene reported the area had had significant rain lately, so the ground was softer than normal.

== See also ==
- List of airports in Michigan
