= Jacques-François Le Poivre =

Jacques-François Le Poivre (11 February 1652 – 6 December 1710) was a mathematician and geometer who was a pioneer of projective geometry. He is largely known from a single book in French on conic sections, Traité des sections du cylindrie et du cône considérées dans le solide et dans le plan, avec des démonstrations simples & nouvelles (1704).

Le Poivre was born in Mons to son of Jacques and Catherine Demeurs. The Le Poivre family had many engineers including Pierre Le Poivre (1546-1626), an architect and military engineer. Jacques-François too studied mathematics and geometry and worked as a clerk and surveyor for the city of Mons. In 1700 he moved to Paris and in 1704 he published a treatise in two parts on cylindrical and conic sections. This work largely escaped serious study and some reviewers considered it to be plagiarism of Philippe de la Hire. In any case, de la Hire's work was more well-known. In part 2, his method of central projection was essentially the same as used by de La Hire in his 1673 work Nouvelle méthode en géométrie, pour les sections des superficies coniques et cylindriques but it has been suggested that Le Poivre independently discovered this since the book included several original theorems. A second edition of the Traité was published in 1708. An earlier work on an introduction to arithmetic that Le Poivre published in 1687 has never been located. He was a friend of Guillaume de l'Hôpital and a simple proof of the intersecting chords theorem by Le Poivre impressed l'Hôpital and may have made its way into l'Hôpital's Traité analytique des sections coniques. A biography claimed that Le Poivre was a poet.
