= Kenji Fukaya =

Japanese mathematician (born 1959)

- 深谷賢治
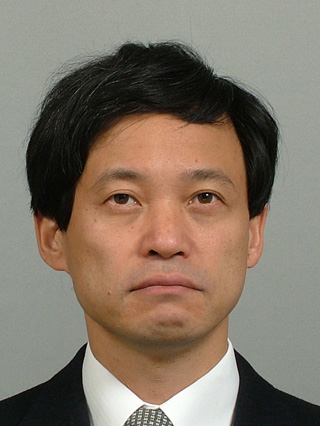
- Kenji Fukaya in 2010
- Born: Kanagawa prefecture, Japan
- Education: University of Tokyo
- Known for: Fukaya category Kuranishi structure
- Scientific career
- Fields: Mathematician
- Workplaces: Simons Center for Geometry and Physics; Stony Brook University; Tsinghua University

Kenji Fukaya (Japanese: 深谷賢治, Fukaya Kenji, born in 1959) is a Japanese mathematician known for his work in symplectic geometry and Riemannian geometry. His many fundamental contributions to mathematics include the discovery of the Fukaya category. He was a permanent faculty member at the Simons Center for Geometry and Physics and a professor of mathematics at Stony Brook University before leaving for Tsinghua University.

== Biography ==
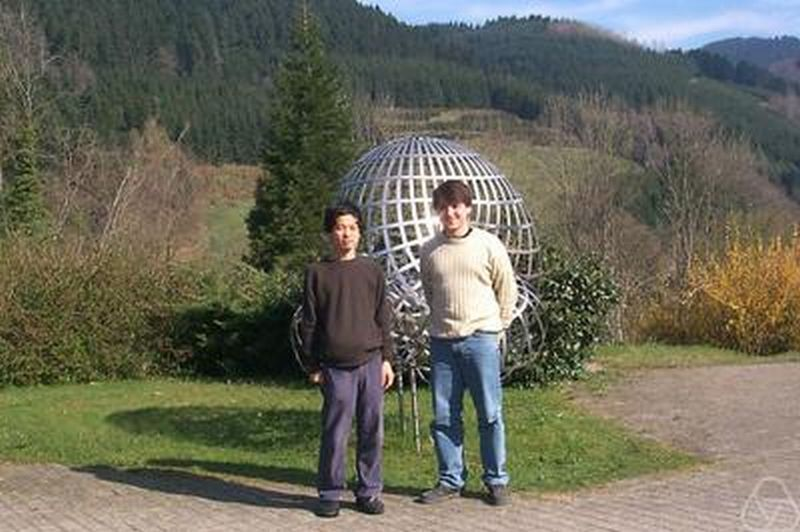
Kenji Fukaya (left) with Paul Seidel, Oberwolfach 2002

Fukaya was both an undergraduate and a graduate student in mathematics at the University of Tokyo, receiving his BA in 1981, and his PhD in 1986. In 1987, he joined the University of Tokyo faculty as an associate professor. He then moved to Kyoto University as a full professor in 1994. In 2013, he then moved to the United States in order to join the faculty of the Simons Center for Geometry and Physics at Stony Brook.

The Fukaya category, meaning the $A_\infty$ category of whose objects are Lagrangian submanifolds of a given symplectic manifold, is named after him, and is intimately related to Floer homology. Other contributions to symplectic geometry include his proof (with Kaoru Ono) of a weak version of the Arnold conjecture and a construction of general Gromov–Witten invariants. His many other mathematical contributions include important theorems in Riemannian geometry and work on physics-related topics such as gauge theory and mirror symmetry.

Fukaya was awarded the Japanese Mathematical Society's Geometry Prize in 1989 and Spring Prize in 1994. He also received the Inoue Prize in 2002, the Japan Academy Prize in 2003, the Asahi Prize in 2009, and the Fujihara Award in 2012. He has served on the governing board of the Japanese Mathematical Society and on the Mathematical Committee of the Science Council of Japan. In 2025 he was awarded the Shaw Prize in Mathematics.

Fukaya was an invited speaker at the 1990 International Congress of Mathematicians in Kyoto, where he gave a talk entitled, Collapsing Riemannian Manifolds and its Applications.

== Selected publications ==
- Fukaya, Kenji (1987). "Collapsing Riemannian Manifolds and Eigenvalues of Laplace-Operators". Inventiones Mathematicae. 87 (3): 517–557. Bibcode:1987InMat..87..517F. doi:10.1007/BF01389241. S2CID 122719694.
- with T. Yamaguchi The fundamental group of almost non negatively curved manifolds, Annals of Mathematics 136, 1992, pp. 253 – 333
- Cheeger, Jeff; Fukaya, Kenji; Gromov, Mikhail (1992). "Nilpotent structures and invariant metrics on collapsed manifolds". Journal of the American Mathematical Society. 5 (2): 327–372. doi:10.1090/S0894-0347-1992-1126118-X.
- with Kaoru Ono Arnold conjecture and Gromov-Witten invariant, Topology, 38, 1999, pp. 933–1048
- with Y. Oh, H. Ohta, K. Ono Lagrangian intersection Floer theory- anomaly and obstruction, 2007
- Morse homotopy, $A_{\infty}$-Category, and Floer homologies, in H. J. Kim (editor) Proceedings of Workshop on Geometry and Topology, Seoul National University, 1994, pp. 1 – 102
- Floer homology and mirror symmetry. II. Minimal surfaces, geometric analysis and symplectic geometry, Adv. Stud. Pure Math. 34, Math. Soc. Japan, Tokyo, 2002, pp. 31–127
- Multivalued Morse theory, asymptotic analysis and mirror symmetry in Graphs and patterns in mathematics and theoretical physics, Proc. Sympos.Pure Math. 73, American Mathematical Society, 2005, pp. 205–278
- Editor: Topology, Geometry and Field Theory, World Scientific 1994
- Editor: Symplectic geometry and mirror symmetry (Korea Institute for Advanced Study conference, Seoul 2000), World Scientific 2001
- Gauge Theory and Topology (in Japanese), Springer Verlag, Tokyo 1995
- Symplectic Geometry (in Japanese), Iwanami Shoten 1999
- Fukaya, Kenji; Oh, Yong-Geun; Ohta, Hiroshi; Ono, Kaoru (2020). Kuranishi Structures and Virtual Fundamental Chains (Springer Monographs in Mathematics). Springer. pp. XV, 638. doi:10.1007/978-981-15-5562-6. ISBN 978-9811555619. S2CID 234938865.
