= Yong-Geun Oh =

South Korean mathematician (born 1961)

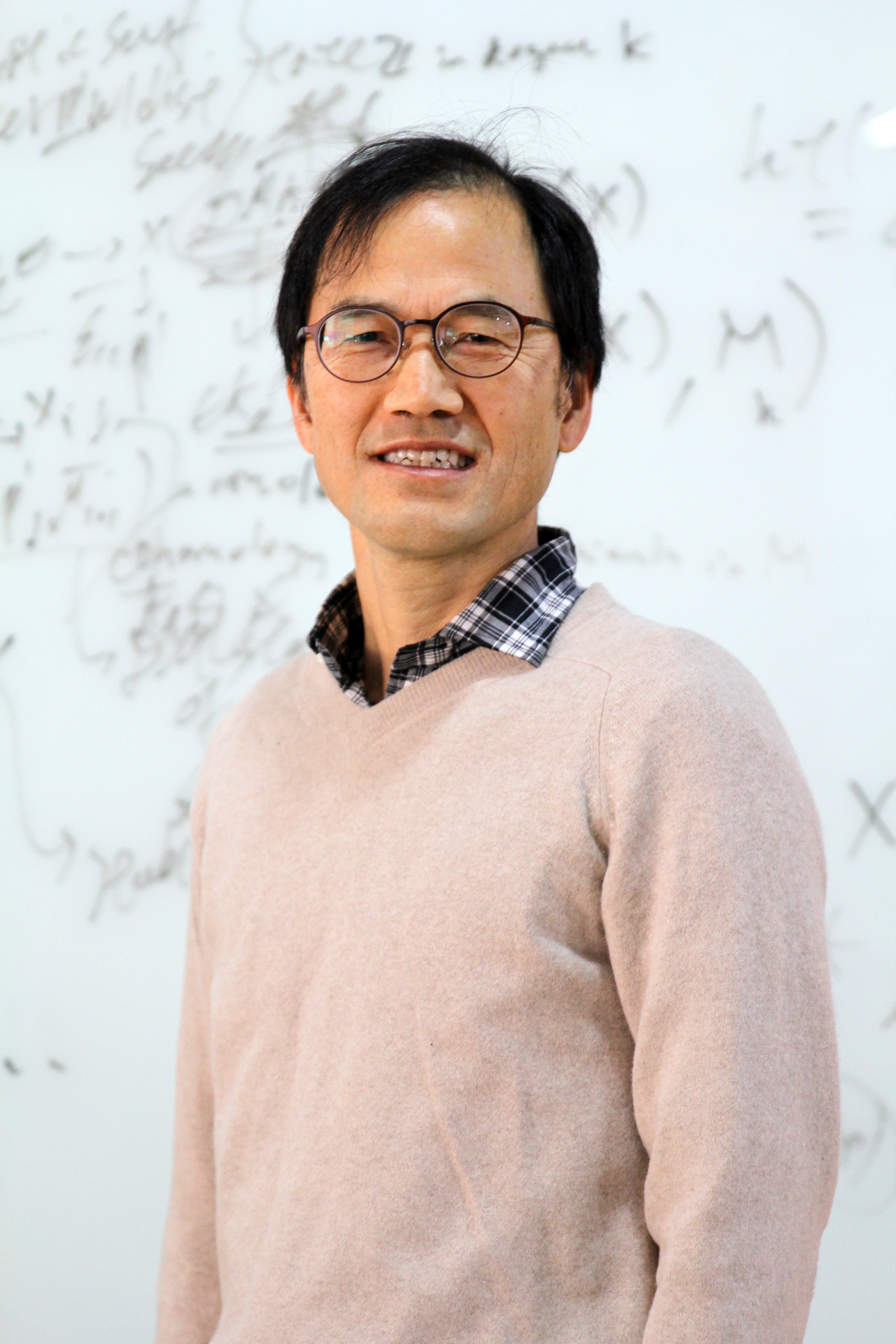
- Born: 1961 (age 64–65)
- Education: U.C. Berkeley, Seoul National University
- Awards: Korea Science Award
- Scientific career
- Fields: Symplectic topology, Floer homology, Hamiltonian mechanics, and mirror symmetry
- Workplaces: Pohang University of Science and Technology, Institute for Basic Science
- Thesis: Nonlinear Schrodinger Equations with Potentials: Evolution, Existence, and Stability of Semi-Classical Bound States (1988)
- Doctoral advisors: Alan Weinstein

Korean name
- Hangul: 오용근
- Hanja: 吳龍根
- RR: O Yonggeun
- MR: O Yonggŭn
- Website: Center for Geometry and Physics

Yong-Geun Oh (Korean: 오용근; born 1961) is a South Korean mathematician and distinguished professor at the Pohang University of Science and Technology and founding director of the IBS Center for Geometry and Physics located on that campus. His fields of study have been on symplectic topology, Floer homology, Hamiltonian mechanics, and mirror symmetry He was in the inaugural class of fellows of the American Mathematical Society and has been a member of Institute for Advanced Study, Korean Mathematical Society, and National Academy of Sciences of the Republic of Korea and is on the editorial boards of Journal of Gokova Geometry and Topology and Journal of Mathematics of Kyoto University.

== Education ==
Oh went to Seoul National University and received a B.A in mathematics in 1983. He then went to U.C. Berkeley, where he majored in mathematics and his Ph.D. was conferred in 1988. His dissertation research was supervised by Professor Alan Weinstein. With the completion of his PhD, he then focused on developing and enhancing the Floer homology theory in symplectic geometry and its application within that field.

== Career ==
His career started during his Ph.D. program, where he worked as a teaching assistant and then research assistant in the Department of Math at U.C. Berkeley. After graduation, he was a post-doctoral research fellow at the Mathematical Sciences Research Institute, located in Berkeley. He then moved to New York to work as a Courant Instructor at the Courant Institute of Mathematical Sciences for a year. Going to the Department of Mathematics in the University of Wisconsin–Madison, he started as an assistant professor in 1991, associate professor in 1997, and full professor in 2001. During his sabbatical, he was a visiting professor at Stanford University for the academic year 2004–2005.

While teaching at the University of Wisconsin–Madison, he also was a member of the Institute for Advanced Study in Princeton, a research member at the Isaac Newton Institute in the University of Cambridge, visiting professor at the Research Institute for Mathematical Sciences in Kyoto University, and a professor at the Korea Institute for Advanced Study. He became a distinguished professor at the Pohang University of Science and Technology (POSTECH) in 2010 and the founding director of the Institute for Basic Science Center for Geometry and Physics in 2012, which is located on the POSTECH campus.

== Memberships ==
- 2014: Member of Korean Academy of Science and Technology
- 2013: Inaugural Class of Fellows, American Mathematical Society
- 1991–1992: Institute for Advanced Study
- Korean Mathematical Society
- National Academy of Sciences of the Republic of Korea

== Editorial boards ==
- 2007–current: Journal of Gokova Geometry and Topology
- 2009–current: Journal of Mathematics of Kyoto University

== Awards ==
- 2023: Asian Scientist 100, Asian Scientist
- 2022: Ho-Am Prize in Science
- 2019: Korea Science Award
- 2012: Kyung-Ahm Prize
- 2002: Vilas Associate Award, University of Wisconsin
- 2001: Young Scientist Award, Korean Academy of Science and Technology
- 1988: Bernard Friedman memorial prize in Applied Mathematics

== Selected publications ==
- Fukaya, Kenji; Oh, Yong-Geun; Ohta, Hiroshi; Ono, Kaoru (2020). Kuranishi Structures and Virtual Fundamental Chains (Springer Monographs in Mathematics). Springer. pp. XV, 638. doi:10.1007/978-981-15-5562-6. ISBN 978-9811555619.
- Fukaya, Kenji; Oh, Yong-Geun; Ohta, Hiroshi; Ono, Kaoru (2010). Lagrangian Intersection Floer Theory: Anomaly and Obstruction, Part II. American Mathematical Soc. ISBN 9780821852507.
- Fukaya, Kenji; Oh, Yong-Geun; Ohta, Hiroshi; Ono, Kaoru (2009). Lagrangian Intersection Floer Theory: Anomaly and Obstruction. AMS and International Press of Boston. ISBN 978-0-8218-5253-8.
