= Helmut Hofer =

German-American mathematician

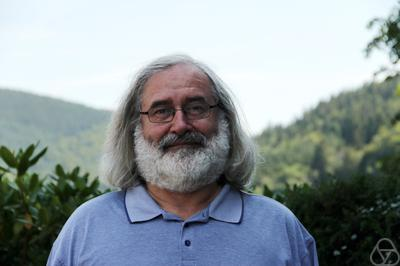
- Hofer at Oberwolfach in 2015
- Born: February 28, 1956
- Education: Universität Zürich
- Known for: Symplectic capacities Hofer geometry Symplectic homology Finite energy foliations Symplectic field theory Polyfold theory
- Awards: Ostrowski Prize (1999); Heinz Hopf Prize (2013)
- Scientific career
- Fields: Mathematics
- Thesis: A Variational Approach to a Class of Resonance Problems with Application to a Wave Equation Problem (1981)
- Doctoral advisor: Peter Hess

Helmut Hermann W. Hofer (born February 28, 1956) is a German-American mathematician, one of the founders of the area of symplectic topology.

He is a member of the National Academy of Sciences, and the recipient of the 1999 Ostrowski Prize and the 2013 Heinz Hopf Prize. Since 2009, he has been a faculty member at the Institute for Advanced Study in Princeton, New Jersey. He currently works on symplectic geometry, dynamical systems, and partial differential equations. His contributions to the field include Hofer geometry. Hofer was elected to the American Academy of Arts and Sciences in 2020.

He was an invited speaker at the International Congress of Mathematicians (ICM) in 1990 in Kyoto and a plenary speaker at the ICM in 1998 in Berlin.

He is currently an editor of Annals of Mathematics.

== Selected publications ==
- Ekeland, Ivar; Hofer, Helmut (1985). "Periodic solutions with prescribed minimal period for convex autonomous Hamiltonian systems". Inventiones Mathematicae. 81 (1): 155–188. Bibcode:1985InMat..81..155E. doi:10.1007/BF01388776. MR 0796195. S2CID 120891372.
- Hofer, Helmut; Zehnder, Eduard (1987). "Periodic solutions on hypersurfaces and a result by C. Viterbo". Inventiones Mathematicae. 90 (1): 1–9. Bibcode:1987InMat..90....1H. doi:10.1007/BF01389030. MR 0906578. S2CID 121157240.
- Ekeland, Ivar; Hofer, Helmut (1989). "Symplectic topology and Hamiltonian dynamics". Mathematische Zeitschrift. 200 (3): 355–378. doi:10.1007/BF01215653. MR 0978597. S2CID 123600347.
- Hofer, Helmut (1990). "On the topological properties of symplectic maps". Proceedings of the Royal Society of Edinburgh, Section A. 115 (1–2): 25–38. doi:10.1017/S0308210500024549. MR 1059642. S2CID 121426158.
- Hofer, Helmut (1993). "Pseudoholomorphic curves in symplectizations with applications to the Weinstein conjecture in dimension three". Inventiones Mathematicae. 114 (3): 515–563. Bibcode:1993InMat.114..515H. doi:10.1007/BF01232679. MR 1244912. S2CID 123618375.
- Hofer, Helmut; Zehnder, Eduard (2011). Symplectic invariants and Hamiltonian dynamics. Modern Birkhäuser Classics. Basel: Birkhäuser Verlag. doi:10.1007/978-3-0348-0104-1. ISBN 978-3-0348-0103-4. MR 2797558.
- Hofer, Helmut; Wysocki, Krzysztof; Zehnder, Eduard (1998). "The dynamics on three-dimensional strictly convex energy surfaces". Annals of Mathematics. 148 (1): 197–289. doi:10.2307/120994. JSTOR 120994. MR 1652928.
- Hofer, Helmut; Wysocki, Krzysztof; Zehnder, Eduard (2003). "Finite energy foliations of tight three-spheres and Hamiltonian dynamics". Annals of Mathematics. 157 (1): 125–255. doi:10.4007/annals.2003.157.125. MR 1954266.
