= Paul Seidel =

Swiss-Italian mathematician (born 1970)

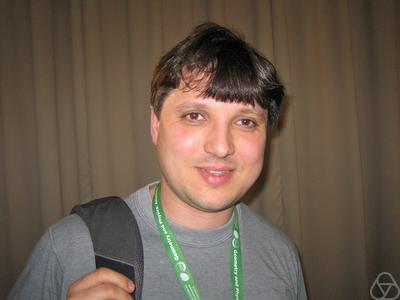
- Born: 30 December 1970 (age 55); Florence, Italy
- Education: University of Oxford; University of Heidelberg
- Awards: Simons Investigator (2012); Fellow of the American Mathematical Society (2012); Veblen Prize in Geometry (2010); EMS Prize (2000)
- Scientific career
- Fields: Mathematics
- Workplaces: University of Chicago; Massachusetts Institute of Technology
- Doctoral advisor: Simon Donaldson
- Doctoral students: Ailsa Keating; Mohammed Abouzaid

Paul Seidel (born 30 December 1970) is a Swiss-Italian mathematician specializing in homological mirror symmetry. He is a faculty member at the Massachusetts Institute of Technology.

== Career ==
Seidel attended Heidelberg University, where he received his Diplom under supervision of Albrecht Dold in 1994. He then pursued his Ph.D. studies at the University of Oxford under supervision of Simon Donaldson (Thesis: Floer Homology and the Symplectic Isotopy Problem) in 1998. He was a chargé de recherche at the CNRS from 1999 to 2002, a professor at Imperial College London from 2002 to 2003, a professor at the University of Chicago from 2003 to 2007, and then a professor at the Massachusetts Institute of Technology from 2007 onwards.

== Awards ==
In 2000, Seidel was awarded the EMS Prize. In 2010, he was awarded the Oswald Veblen Prize in Geometry "for his fundamental contributions to symplectic geometry and, in particular, for his development of advanced algebraic methods for computation of symplectic invariants." In 2012, he became a fellow of the American Mathematical Society and a Simons Investigator.

== Personal life ==
Seidel is married to Ju-Lee Kim, who is also a professor of mathematics at MIT.

== Publications ==
- Fukaya Categories and Picard-Lefschetz Theory, European Mathematical Society, 2008
