= Denis Auroux =

French mathematician (b. 1977)

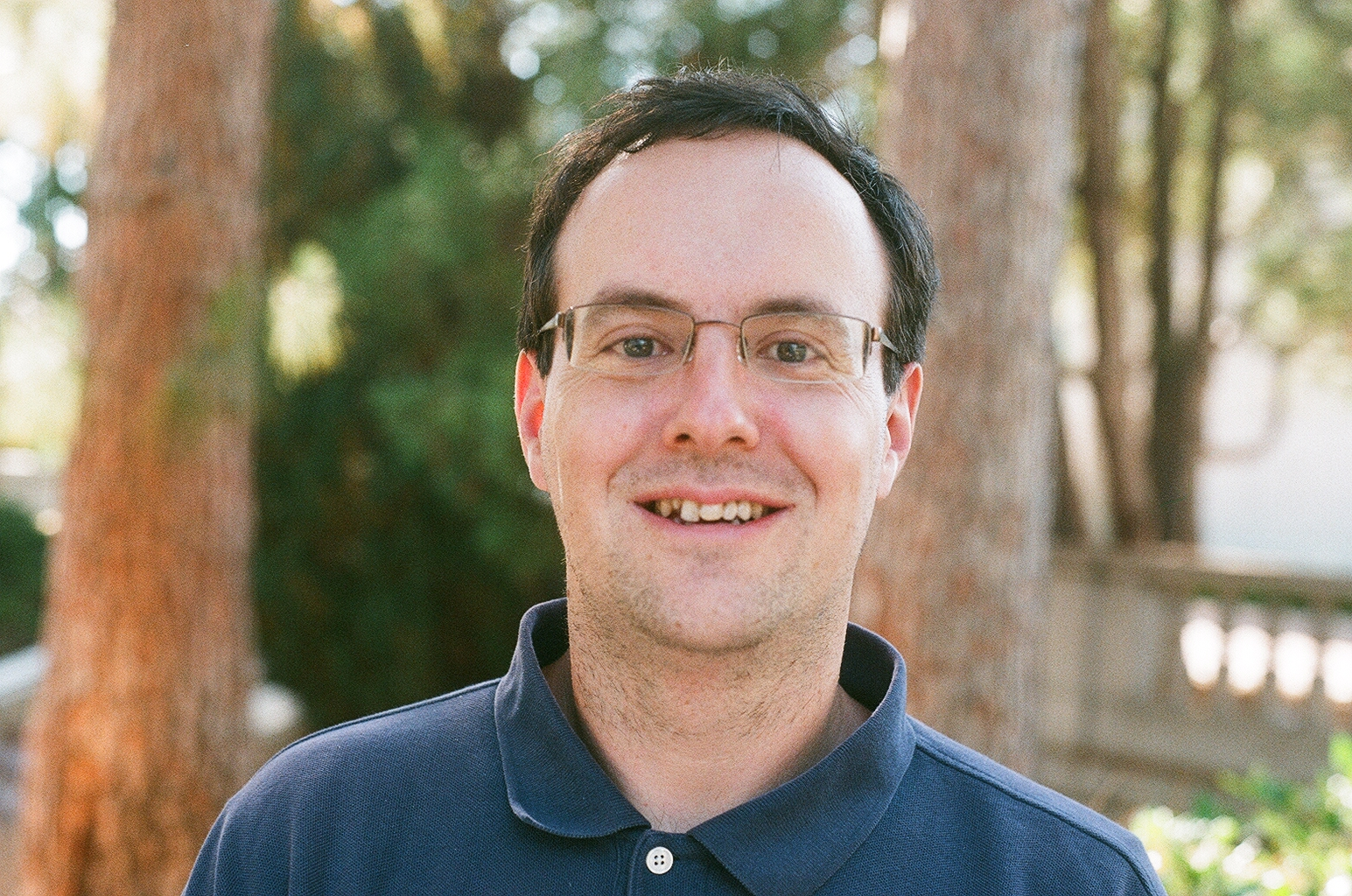
- Auroux in 2010
- Born: April 1977 (age 49); Lyon, France
- Education: École normale supérieure Paris Diderot University; Pierre and Marie Curie University; Paris-Sud University; École polytechnique
- Scientific career
- Fields: Mathematics
- Workplaces: Massachusetts Institute of Technology; University of California, Berkeley; Harvard University

Denis Auroux (born April 1977) is a French mathematician working in geometry and topology.

== Education and career ==
Auroux was admitted in 1993 to the École normale supérieure (Paris). In 1994, he received a licentiate and maîtrise in mathematics from Paris Diderot University (Paris 7). In 1995, he received a licentiate in physics from Pierre and Marie Curie University (Paris 6) and passed the agrégation. In 1995, he received a master's degree in mathematics from Paris-Sud University with a thesis on Seiberg-Witten invariants of symplectic manifolds. In 1999, he received his doctorate from the École polytechnique with supervisors Jean-Pierre Bourguignon and Mikhael Gromov for a thesis on structure theorems for compact symplectic manifolds via almost-complex techniques. In 2003, he completed his habilitation at Paris-Sud University with a thesis on approximately holomorphic techniques and monodromy invariants in symplectic topology.

As a postdoc, he was a C. L. E. Moore instructor at the Massachusetts Institute of Technology from 1999 to 2002, where he became an assistant professor in 2002, an associate professor in 2004 (tenured in 2006), and a professor in 2009 (on leave from 2009 to 2011). From 2009 to 2018, he was a professor at the University of California, Berkeley. Since Fall 2018, he has been at Harvard University, where he taught Math 55, two-semester honors undergraduate course on algebra and analysis.

His research deals with symplectic geometry, low-dimensional topology, and mirror symmetry.

In 2002, he received the Prix Peccot from the Collège de France. In 2005, he received a Sloan Research Fellowship. He was an invited speaker in 2010 with talk Fukaya Categories and bordered Heegaard-Floer Homology at the International Congress of Mathematicians in Hyderabad and in 2004 at the European Congress of Mathematicians in Stockholm.

He is also the author of the free and open-source handwritten note-taking software Xournal, which has been developed into Xournal++.

== Selected publications ==
- Auroux, Denis (2000). "Symplectic 4-manifolds as branched coverings of $\mathbb{CP}$2". Inventiones Mathematicae. 139 (3): 551–602. Bibcode:2000InMat.139..551A. doi:10.1007/s002220050019. S2CID 9954552.
- Auroux, Denis; Katzarkov, Ludmil (2000). "Branched coverings of $\mathbb{CP}$2 and invariants of symplectic 4-manifolds". Inventiones Mathematicae. 142 (3): 631–673. Bibcode:2000InMat.142..631A. doi:10.1007/PL00005795. S2CID 40984397.
- Auroux, Denis; Donaldson, Simon K.; Katzarkov, Ludmil (2005). "Singular Lefschetz pencils". Geometry & Topology. 9 (2): 1043–1114. arXiv:math/0410332. doi:10.2140/gt.2005.9.1043. S2CID 2364993.
- Auroux, Denis; Katzarkov, Ludmil; Orlov, Dmitri (2006). "Mirror symmetry for del Pezzo surfaces: Vanishing cycles and coherent sheaves". Inventiones Mathematicae. 166 (3): 537–582. arXiv:math/0506166. Bibcode:2006InMat.166..537A. doi:10.1007/s00222-006-0003-4. S2CID 5322441.
- Auroux, Denis; Katzarkov, Ludmil; Orlov, Dmitri (2008). "Mirror Symmetry for Weighted Projective Planes and Their Noncommutative Deformations". Annals of Mathematics. 167 (3): 867–943. arXiv:math/0404281. doi:10.4007/annals.2008.167.867. JSTOR 40345366. S2CID 6989346.
- Auroux, Denis; Smith, Ivan (2008). "Lefschetz pencils, branched covers and symplectic invariants". Symplectic 4-manifolds and algebraic surfaces (Cetraro, 2003). Lecture Notes in Mathematics. Vol. 1938. Springer. pp. 1–53. arXiv:math/0401021.
- Auroux, Denis (2009). "Special Lagrangian fibrations, wall-crossing, and mirror symmetry". Surveys in Differential Geometry. 13: 1–47. arXiv:0902.1595. doi:10.4310/SDG.2008.v13.n1.a1. S2CID 15635047.
- Auroux, Denis (2013). "A beginner's introduction to Fukaya categories". arXiv:1301.7056 [math.SG].
- Abouzaid, Mohammed; Auroux, Denis; Efimov, Alexander I.; Katzarkov, Ludmil; Orlov, Dmitri (2013). "Homological mirror symmetry for punctured spheres". Journal of the American Mathematical Society. 26 (4): 1051–1083. arXiv:1103.4322. doi:10.1090/S0894-0347-2013-00770-5. S2CID 32592919.
