= Geometry Festival =

American annual mathematics conference

The Geometry Festival is an annual mathematics conference held in the United States.

The festival has been held since 1985 at the University of Pennsylvania, the University of Maryland, the University of North Carolina, the State University of New York at Stony Brook, Duke University and New York University's Courant Institute of Mathematical Sciences. It is a three day conference that focuses on the major recent results in geometry and related fields.

== Previous Geometry Festival speakers ==
=== 1985 at Penn ===
- Marcel Berger
- Pat Eberlein
- Jost Eschenburg
- Friedrich Hirzebruch
- Blaine Lawson
- Leon Simon
- Scott Wolpert
- Deane Yang

=== 1986 at Maryland ===
- Uwe Abresch, Explicit constant mean curvature tori
- Zhi-yong Gao, The existence of negatively Ricci curved metrics
- David Hoffman, New results in the global theory of minimal surfaces
- Jack Lee, Conformal geometry and the Yamabe problem
- Ngaiming Mok, Compact Kähler manifolds of non-negative curvature
- John Morgan, Self dual connections and the topology of 4-manifolds
- Chuu-Lian Terng, Submanifolds with flat normal bundle

=== 1987 at Penn ===
- Robert Bryant, The construction of metrics with exceptional holonomy
- Francis Bonahon, Hyperbolic 3-manifolds with arbitrarily short geodesics
- Keith Burns, Geodesic flows on the 2-sphere
- Andreas Floer, Instantons and Casson's invariant
- Hermann Karcher, Embedded minimal surfaces in the 3-sphere
- Jürgen Moser, Minimal foliations of tori
- Edward Witten. Applications of quantum field theory to topology

=== 1988 at North Carolina ===
- Detlef Gromoll, On complete spaces of non-negative Ricci curvature
- Nicolas Kapouleas, Constant mean curvature surfaces in E3
- Robert Osserman, Gauss map of complete minimal surfaces
- Pierre Pansu, Lp-cohomology of negatively curved manifolds
- Peter Petersen, Bounding homotopy types by geometry
- Gang Tian, Kähler-Einstein metrics on quasiprojective manifolds
- DaGang Yang, Some new examples of manifolds of positive Ricci curvature
- Wolfgang Ziller, Recent results on Einstein metrics

=== 1989 at Stony Brook ===
- Eugenio Calabi, Extremal singular metrics on surfaces
- Harold Donnelly, Nodal sets of eigenfunctions on Riemannian manifolds
- Yakov Eliashberg, Symplectic geometric methods in several complex variables
- F. Thomas Farrell, A topological analogue of Mostow's rigidity theorem
- Lesley Sibner, Solutions to Yang-Mills equations which are not self-dual
- Carlos Simpson, Moduli spaces of representations of fundamental groups

=== 1990 at Maryland ===
- Michael T. Anderson, Behavior of metrics under Ricci curvature bounds
- Kevin Corlette, Harmonic maps and geometric superrigidity
- Kenji Fukaya, Fundamental groups of almost non-negatively curved manifolds
- Mikhail Gromov, Recent progress in symplectic geometry
- Werner Müller, On spectral theory for locally symmetric manifolds with finite volume
- Rick Schoen, Least area problems for Lagrangian submanifolds
- Gudlaugur Thorbergsson, Isoparametric submanifolds and their Tits buildings
- Shing-Tung Yau, Some theorems in Kähler geometry

=== 1991 at Duke ===
- Jeff Cheeger, Transgressed Euler classes of SL(2n,Z)-bundles and adiabatic limits of eta-invariants
- Chris Croke, Volumes of balls in manifolds without conjugate points and rigidity of geodesic flows
- Carolyn Gordon, When you can't hear the shape of a manifold
- Wu-Yi Hsiang, Sphere packing and spherical geometry: The Kepler conjecture and beyond
- Alan Nadel, On the geometry of Fano varieties
- Grigori Perelman, Alexandrov's spaces with curvature bounded from below
- Stephan Stolz, On the space of positive curvature metrics modulo diffeomorphisms

=== 1992 at Courant ===
- Jonathan Block, Aperiodic tilings, positive scalar curvature and other homological phenomena
- John Franks, Infinitely many closed geodesics on the 2-sphere
- Karsten Grove, The inevitable presence of singular spaces in Riemannian geometry
- Lisa Jeffrey, Volumes of moduli spaces of flat connections on Riemannian surfaces
- Jun Li, Anti-self-dual connections on SU(2) bundles over algebraic surfaces
- Dusa McDuff, Symplectic 4-manifolds
- Clifford Taubes, Anti-self dual conformal structures in 4 dimensions

=== 1993 at Penn ===
- Shiing-Shen Chern, Finsler geometry
- Richard S. Hamilton, An isoperimetric estimate for the curve-shrinking flow
- Vaughan Jones, Loop groups and operator algebras
- Claude LeBrun, Compact Kähler manifolds of constant scalar curvature
- Louis Nirenberg, The maximum principle and related things
- Xiaochun Rong, Collapsing in low dimensions and rationality of geometric invariants
- Isadore Singer, Geometry and quantum field theory

=== 1995 at Stony Brook ===
- Dimitri Burago, Asymptotic geometry of Z^n-periodic metrics
- Tobias Colding, Ricci curvature and convergence
- Dominic Joyce, Compact Riemannian manifolds with exceptional holonomy groups
- Yael Karshon, Hamiltonian torus actions
- David Morrison, Analogues of Seiberg–Witten invariants for counting curves on Calabi–Yau manifolds
- Tomasz Mrowka, The Seiberg-Witten equations and 4-manifold topology
- Yongbin Ruan, Higher genus pseudo-holomorphic curves
- Edward Witten, Monopoles and four-manifolds

=== 1996 at Maryland ===
- John C. Baez, Quantum gravity and BF theory in 4 dimensions
- Jean-Luc Brylinski, Gauge groups and reciprocity laws on algebraic varieties
- Bruce Kleiner, Spaces of nonpositive curvature
- Grigory Margulis, Quantitative Oppenheim Conjecture
- Sergei P. Novikov, Laplace and Darboux transformations
- Richard Schwartz, The Devil's Pentagram
- Guofang Wei, Volume comparison with integral curvature bounds
- Shmuel Weinberger, Equivariant rigidity: For and against

=== 1997 at Duke ===
- Jeanne Nielsen Clelland, Geometry of Conservation Laws for Parabolic PDE's
- Anatole Katok, Rigidity and invariant geometric structures for differentiable group actions
- François Labourie, Monge-Ampere problems, holomorphic curves and laminations
- Gang Liu, Floer Homology and the Arnold Conjecture
- William Minicozzi II, Harmonic functions on manifolds
- Lorenz Schwachhöfer, The classification of irreducible holonomies of torsion free connections
- Matthias Schwarz, Symplectic fixed points and quantum cohomology
- Stephen Semmes, Geometry with little smoothness

=== 1998 at Stony Brook ===
- Scott Axelrod, Generalized Chern-Simons invariants as a generalized Lagrangian field theory
- Jean-Michel Bismut, Chern-Simons classes, Bott Chern classes and analytic torsion
- Spencer Bloch, Algebro-geometric Chern-Simons classes
- Robert Bryant, Recent progress on the holonomy classification problem
- Robert Bryant (for S.-S. Chern), Recent results and open problems in Finsler geometry
- Jeff Cheeger and Blaine Lawson, The mathematical work of James Simons
- Jeff Cheeger, Ricci Curvature
- Jürg Fröhlich, Physics and the Chern-Simons form (from anomalies to the quantum Hall effect to magnetic stars)
- Mikhail Gromov, Dynamics on function spaces
- Maxim Kontsevich, On regulators, critical values and q-factorials
- Blaine Lawson, Connections and singularities of maps
- Robert MacPherson, Spaces with torus actions
- John Milnor, Remarks on geometry and dynamics
- I.M. Singer, TBA
- Dennis Sullivan A combinatorial model for non-linearity
- Clifford Taubes, Seiberg-Witten invariants, harmonic forms, and their pseudo-holomorphic curves
- Gang Tian, Yang-Mills connections and calibration
- C.-N. Yang, Vector potentials and connections
- Shing-Tung Yau, Mirror symmetry and rational curves

=== 1999 at Penn ===
- Peter Sarnak, Some spectral problems on negatively curved manifolds
- Zheng-xu He, The gradient flow for the Möbius energy of knots
- Curtis McMullen, The moduli space of Riemann surfaces is Kähler-hyperbolic
- Paul Biran, Lagrange skeletons and symplectic rigidity
- Helmut Hofer, Holomorphic curves and contact geometry
- Werner Ballmann, On negative curvature and the essential spectrum of geometric operators
- Shlomo Sternberg, Multiplets of representations and Kostant's Dirac operator

=== 2000 at Maryland ===
- Samuel Ferguson, The Kepler Conjecture
- Robert Meyerhoff, Rigorous computer-aided proofs in the theory of hyperbolic 3-manifolds
- Herman Gluck, Geometry, topology and plasma physics
- Burkhard Wilking, New examples of manifolds with positive sectional curvature almost everywhere
- John Roe, Amenability and assembly maps
- Eleny Ionel, Gromov invariants of symplectic sums
- Mikhail Gromov, Spaces of holomorphic maps

=== 2001 at Northeastern ===
- Robert Bryant, Rigidity and quasirigidity of extremal cycles in Hermitian symmetric spaces
- Tobias Colding, Embedded minimal surfaces in 3-manifolds
- Boris Dubrovin, Normal forms of integrable PDE's
- John Lott, Heat equation methods in noncommutative geometry
- Dusa McDuff, Seminorms on the Hamiltonian group and the nonsqueezing theorem
- Rick Schoen, Variational approaches to the construction minimal lagrangian submanifolds
- Shing-Tung Yau, Mirror symmetry

=== 2002 at Courant ===
- Denis Auroux, Singular plane curves and topological invariants of symplectic manifolds
- Hugh Bray, On the mass of higher dimensional black holes
- Alice Chang, Conformally invariant operators and the Gauss-Bonnet integrand
- Xiuxiong Chen, The space of Kähler metrics
- George Daskalopoulos, On the Yang-Mills flow in higher dimensions
- Alex Eskin, Billiards and lattices
- Juha Heinonen, On the existence of quasiregular mappings

=== 2003 at Duke ===
- Bennett Chow, Harnack estimates of Li–Yau–Hamilton type for the Ricci flow
- Anda Degeratu, Geometrical McKay Correspondence
- Ron Donagi, Griffiths' intermediate Jacobians, integrable systems, and string theory
- John Etnyre, Legendrian knots in high dimensions
- Joe Harris, Are Cubics Rational?
- Claude LeBrun, Zoll Manifolds, Complex Surfaces, and Holomorphic Disks
- John Morgan, Variations of Hodge structure for 1-parameter families of Calabi–Yau three-folds
- Madhav Nori, A modified Hodge conjecture
- Justin Sawon, Twisted Fourier–Mukai transforms for holomorphic symplectic manifolds
- Wilfried Schmid, Automorphic distributions, L-functions, and functional equations
- Jeff Viaclovsky, Fully nonlinear equations and conformal geometry
- Claire Voisin, K-correspondences and intrinsic pseudovolume forms

=== 2004 at Courant ===
- Jean-Michel Bismut, The Hypoelliptic Laplacian on the Cotangent Bundle
- Yasha Eliashberg, Positive Loops of Contact Transformations
- Blaine Lawson, Projective Hulls and the Projective Gelfand Transformation
- Dusa McDuff, Applications of J-holomorphic Curves
- Xiaochun Rong, Local splitting structures on nonpositively curved manifolds
- Dennis Sullivan, Algebraic topology in string backgrounds
- Gang Tian, Extremal Metrics and Holomorphic Discs
- Edward Witten, Gauge Theory Scattering From Curves In CP3

=== 2005 at Stony Brook ===
- Nancy Hingston, Periodic solutions of Hamilton's equations on tori
- Sergiu Klainerman, Null hypersurfaces and curvature estimates in general relativity
- Bruce Kleiner, Singular structure of mean curvature flow
- Frank Pacard, Blowing up Kähler manifolds with constant scalar curvature
- Rahul Pandharipande, A topological view of Gromov-Witten theory
- Igor Rodniansky, Non-linear waves and Einstein geometry
- Yum-Tong Siu, Methods of singular metrics in algebraic geometry
- Katrin Wehrheim, Floer theories in symplectic topology and gauge theory

=== 2006 at Penn ===
- Jeff Cheeger, Differentiation, bi-Lipschitz nonembedding and embedding
- Charles Fefferman, Fitting a smooth function to data
- Helmut Hofer, On the analytic and geometric foundations of symplectic field theory
- Ko Honda, Reeb vector fields and open book decompositions
- William H. Meeks, The Dynamics Theorem for embedded minimal surfaces
- Yair Minsky, Asymptotic geometry of the mapping class group
- Frank Morgan, Manifolds with Density
- Zoltan Szabo, Link Floer homology and the Thurston norm

=== 2007 at Maryland ===
- Dan Freed, Secondary differential-geometric invariants, generalized cohomology, and QCD
- Xiaobo Lu, Mean curvature flow for isoparametric submanifolds
- Vitali Kapovitch, Some open problems in comparison geometry
- Maryam Mirzakhani, Lattice point asymptotics and conformal densities on Teichmüller space
- Charles Epstein, Stein fillings and index theorems
- Guoliang Yu, Group actions and K-theory
- Simon Brendle, Blow-up phenomena for the Yamabe PDE in high dimensions

=== 2008 at Duke ===
- Michael Anderson, Conformally compact Einstein metrics with prescribed conformal infinity
- Robert Bryant, Riemannian Submersions as PDE
- Greg Galloway, Stability of marginally trapped surfaces with applications to black holes
- Marcus Khuri, The Yamabe Problem Revisited
- John Lott, Optimal transport in Riemannian geometry and Ricci flow
- William Minicozzi, The rate of change of width under flows
- Duong Phong, Stability and constant scalar curvature
- Jeff Viaclovsky, Orthogonal Complex Structures

=== 2009 at Stony Brook ===
- Jeff Cheeger, Quantitative Behavior of Maps from the Heisenberg Group to L1
- Marcos Dajczer, Conformal Killing graphs with prescribed mean curvature
- Karsten Grove, Positive curvature: the quest for examples
- Wolfgang Meyer, The Contributions of Detlef Gromoll to Riemannian Geometry
- Gabriel Paternain, Transparent Connections over Negatively Curved Surfaces
- Christina Sormani, The Intrinsic Flat Distance between Riemannian Manifolds
- Guofang Wei, Smooth Metric Measure Spaces

=== 2010 at Courant ===
- Tim Austin (UCLA): Rational group ring elements with kernels having irrational von Neumann dimension
- Xiuxiong Chen (UW Madison): The space of Kaehler metrics
- Tobias Colding (MIT): Sharp Hölder continuity of tangent cones for spaces with a lower Ricci curvature bound and applications
- Marianna Csörnyei (University College London and Yale): Tangents of null sets
- Larry Guth (U Toronto): Contraction of surface areas vs. topology of mappings
- Jeremy Kahn (Stony Brook): Essential immersed surfaces in closed hyperbolic three-manifolds
- Gang Tian (Princeton): Kähler–Ricci flow through finite-time singularities

=== 2011 at Penn ===
- Hubert Bray (Duke): On dark matter, spiral galaxies, and the axioms of general relativity
- Tobias Colding (MIT): Generic mean curvature flow
- Claude LeBrun (Stony Brook): On Hermitian Einstein 4-manifolds
- Natasa Sesum (Rutgers): Yamabe Solitons
- Pete Storm (Jane Street Capital): Infinitesimal rigidity of hyperbolic manifolds with totally geodesic boundary
- Brian Weber (Courant): Regularity and convergence of extremal Kaehler metrics
- Shing-Tung Yau (Harvard): An appreciation of Eugenio Calabi and his work
- Shing-Tung Yau (Harvard): Quasi-local mass in general relativity

=== 2012 at Duke ===
- John Etnyre (Georgia Institute of Technology): Surgery and tight contact structures
- Valentino Tosatti (Columbia University): The evolution of a Hermitian metric by its Chern-Ricci curvature
- Carla Cederbaum (Duke University): From Newton to Einstein: A guided tour through space and time
- Jan Metzger (Institute for Mathematics, University of Potsdam ): On isoperimetric surfaces in asymptotically flat manifolds
- Fernando Codá Marques (IMPA, Brazil): Min-max theory and the Willmore conjecture
- Yanir Rubinstein (Stanford University): Einstein metrics on Kähler manifolds
- Simon Brendle (Stanford University): Rotational symmetry of self-similar solutions to the Ricci flow
- Mu-Tao Wang (Columbia University): A variational problem for isometric embeddings and its applications in general relativity
- Gordana Matic (University of Georgia): Contact invariant in Sutured Floer Homology and fillability

=== 2013 at Maryland ===
- Bo Berndtsson (Chalmers University): Variations of Bergman kernels and symmetrization of plurisubharmonic functions
- Simon Donaldson (Imperial College, London): Kähler-Einstein metrics, extremal metrics and stability
- Hans-Joachim Hein (Imperial College, London): Singularities of Kähler-Einstein metrics and complete Calabi–Yau manifolds
- Peter Kronheimer (Harvard University): Instanton homology for knots and webs
- Andrea Malchiodi (SISSA): Uniformization of surfaces with conical singularities
- Aaron Naber (MIT): Characterizations of bounded Ricci curvature and applications
- Yuval Peres (Microsoft Research): The geometry of fair allocation to random points
- Brian White (Stanford University): Gap theorems for minimal submanifolds of spheres

=== 2014 at Stony Brook ===
- Robert Bryant (Duke University): Rolling surfaces and exceptional geometry
- Alice Chang (Princeton University): On positivity of a class of conformal covariant operators
- Mihalis Dafermos (Princeton University): On null singularities for the Einstein vacuum equations and the strong cosmic censorship conjecture in general relativity
- Kenji Fukaya (Stony Brook): Mirror symmetry between Toric A model and LG B model: some recent progress
- Matthew Gursky (Notre Dame University): Critical metrics on connected sums of Einstein four-manifolds
- Robert Haslhofer (New York University): Mean curvature flow with surgery
- Andre Neves (Imperial College): Existence of minimal hypersurfaces
- Song Sun (Stony Brook): Kähler-Einstein metrics: Gromov-Hausdorff limits and algebraic geometry

=== 2015 at Courant ===
- Gábor Székelyhidi (Notre Dame): Kahler-Einstein metrics along the smooth continuity method
- Blaine Lawson (Stony Brook): Potential theory for nonlinear PDE's
- John Pardon (Stanford): Existence of Lefschetz vibrations on Stein/Weinstein domains
- Raanan Schul (Stony Brook): Qualitative and quantitative rectifiability
- Ursula Hamenstädt (Bonn): A Gromov/Thurston rigidity theorem for hyperbolic groups
- Tatiana Toro (Washington): Almost minimizers with free boundary
- Richard Bamler (Berkeley): There are finitely many surgeries in Perelman's Ricci flow

=== 2016 at Princeton ===
- Claude LeBrun (Stony Brook): Mass in Kähler Geometry
- Ian Agol (UC Berkeley and IAS): Pseudo-Anosov stretch factors and homology of mapping tori
- Davi Maximo (Stanford): Minimal surfaces with bounded index
- Fernando Marques (Princeton): Morse index and multiplicity of min-max minimal hypersurfaces
- Nancy Hingston (The College of New Jersey): Loop Products, Index Growth, and Dynamics
- Jennifer Hom (Georgia Tech and IAS): Symplectic four-manifolds and Heegaard Floer homology
- Fengbo Hang (NYU, Courant): Fourth order Paneitz operator and Q curvature equation
- Jake Solomon (Hebrew University): The space of positive Lagrangians

=== 2017 at Duke ===
- Lucas Ambrozio (Imperial College) - Some new results for free boundary minimal surfaces
- Otis Chodosh (Princeton) - Some new results on the global geometry of scalar curvature
- Mark Haskins (Imperial College)
- Chi Li (Purdue) - On metric tangent cones at Klt singularities
- Marco Radeschi (Notre Dame) - "When all geodesics are closed"
- Christina Sormani (CUNY) - "The Limits of Sequences of manifolds with Nonnegative Scalar Curvature"
- Jeff Streets (UC Irvine) - Generalized Kahler Ricci flow and a generalized Calabi conjecture

=== 2018 at Penn ===
- Jean-Pierre Bourguignon (IHES)
- Eugenio Calabi (Penn)
- Yakov Eliashberg (Stanford)
- Carolyn S. Gordon (Dartmouth)
- Daniel Ketover (Princeton)
- Yevgeny Liokumovich (MIT)
- Rick Schoen (UC Irvine)
- Jenny Wilson (Stanford)

=== 2019 at Maryland ===
- Yann Brenier (ETH, Zurich) - Fluid Mechanics and Geometry
- Dietmar Salamon (CNRS, DMA-École Normale Supérieure ) - Moment maps in symplectic and Kähler geometry
- Aleksandr Logunov (IAS, Princeton) - Zero sets of Laplace eigenfunctions
- Jim Bryan (University of British Columbia) AG - The enumerative geometry and arithmetic of some of the world’s Tiniest Calabi–Yau threefolds
- Yi Wang (Johns Hopkins University) - Boundary operator associated to σ_{k} curvature
- Steven Zelditch (Northwestern University) - Spectral asymptotics on stationary spacetimes
- Xuwen Zhu (University of California, Berkeley) Spherical Metrics with Conical Singularities
- Alex Wright (University of Michigan) - Nearly Fuchsian surface subgroups of finite covolume Kleinian groups

=== 2021 at Stony Brook (via Zoom) ===
- Joel Spruck (Johns Hopkins University) - A Personal Tribute to Louis Nirenberg
- Akito Futaki (Yau Center, Tsinghua) - Deformation Quantization, and Obstructions to the Existence of Closed Star Products
- Jean-Pierre Demailly (Institut Fourier, Grenoble) - Holomorphic Morse Inequalities, Old and New
- Tristan Collins (MIT) - SYZ Mirror Symmetry for del Pezzo Surfaces
- Jim Isenberg (University of Oregon) - Some Recent Results on Ricci Flow
- Chiu-Chu Melissa Liu (Columbia University) - Topological Recursion and Crepant Transformation Conjecture
- Bing Wang (USTC) - Local entropy along the Ricci flow
- Simon Donaldson (SCGP, Stony Brook/ Imperial College, London) - Some boundary value and mapping problems for differential forms

=== 2022 at Courant (online) ===
- Panagiota Daskalopoulos (Columbia University) - Ancient solutions to geometric flows
- Jingyin Huang (The Ohio State University) - The Helly geometry of some fundamental groups of complex hyperplane arrangement complements
- Wenshuai Jiang (Zhejiang University) - Gromov–Hausdorff limit of manifolds and some applications
- Chao Li (Courant Institute of Mathematical Sciences) - The geometry and topology of scalar curvature in low dimensions
- Ciprian Manolescu (Stanford University) - A knot Floer stable homotopy type
- Assaf Naor (Princeton University) - Extension, separation and isomorphic reverse isoperimetry
- André Neves (University of Chicago) - Geodesics and minimal surfaces
- Lu Wang (Yale University) - Hypersurfaces of low entropy are isotopically trivial
- Ruobing Zhang (Princeton University) - Metric geometry of Calabi–Yau manifolds in complex dimension two

=== 2023 at Princeton ===
- Yuxin Ge (Institut de Mathématiques de Toulouse Université Paul Sabatier) - Compactness of asymptotically hyperbolic Einstein manifolds in dimension 4 and applications
- Christopher Bishop (Stony Brook University) - Weil-Petersson curves, traveling salesman theorems and minimal surfaces
- Emmy Murphy (Princeton University) - Flexibility in contact and symplectic geometry
- Antoine Song (California Institute of Technology) - Stability for the entropy inequality and the positive mass theorem
- Gang Tian (BICMR and SMS, Peking University) - Ricci flow on Fano manifolds
- Karen Uhlenbeck (Institute for Advanced Study) - Best Lipschitz Maps, Transverse Measures and Earthquake Flows
- Robert Young (Courant Institute, New York University) - Metric differentiation and embeddings of the Heisenberg group
- Jonathan Zung (Massachusetts Institute of Technology) - Anosov flows and the pair of pants differential

=== 2024 at the University of Pennsylvania ===
- Robert Bryant (Duke University) - The affine Bonnet problem and integrability
- Xiuxiong Chen (Stony Brook University, University of Science and Technology of China) - Mathematics Inspired by E. Calabi: A narrative from his former student
- Simon Donaldson (Imperial College London) - Deformation theory for complex Calabi-Yau threefolds with boundary
- H. Blaine Lawson (Stony Brook University) - Generalized Potential Theories and Nonlinear PDEs
- Claude LeBrun (Stony Brook University) - Einstein Manifolds, Extremal Kähler Metrics, and Gravitational Instantons
- Yang Li (Massachusetts Institute of Technology) - Metric SYZ conjecture
- Natasa Sesum (Rutgers University) - Generalized cylinder limits of Ricci flow singularities
- Bing Wang (University of Science and Technology of China) - On Kähler Ricci shrinkers
- Shing-Tung Yau (Tsinghua University, China) - Complete Calabi-Yau metrics

=== 2026 at Duke University ===
- Simon Brendle (Columbia University) - Systolic inequalities and the Horowitz–Myers conjecture
- Daniel Cristofaro-Gardiner (University of Maryland) - Symplectic dynamics, Floer-theoretic Weyl laws, and the Simplicity Conjecture
- Tamas Darvas (University of Maryland) - A YTD correspondence for constant scalar curvature metrics
- Sven Hirsch (Columbia University) - Causality of Killing vector fields and Killing spinors
- Yi Lai (University of California, Irvine) - Classification of ancient cylindrical mean curvature flows and the Mean Convex Neighborhood Conjecture
- Chi Li (Rutgers University) - On the volume of Kähler-Einstein Fano varieties
- Ben Lowe (University of Chicago) - Rigidity and Finiteness of Totally Geodesic Hypersurfaces
- Andrew Sageman-Furnas (North Carolina State University) - Constructing isometric tori with the same curvatures
- Bruno Staffa (Rice University) - Weyl Law for the volume spectrum and applications
