= Guofang Wei =

Chinese mathematician (born 1965)

- Born: 1965 (age 60–61); China
- Education: SUNY Stony Brook
- Scientific career
- Fields: Mathematics
- Workplaces: University of California, Santa Barbara
- Doctoral advisor: Detlef Gromoll

Guofang Wei is a mathematician in the field of differential geometry. She is a professor at the University of California, Santa Barbara.

== Education ==
Wei earned a doctorate in mathematics from the State University of New York at Stony Brook in 1989, under the supervision of Detlef Gromoll. Her dissertation produced fundamental new examples of manifolds with positive Ricci curvature and was published in the Bulletin of the American Mathematical Society. These examples were later expanded upon by Burkard Wilking.

== Research ==
In addition to her work on the topology of manifolds with nonnegative Ricci curvature, she has completed work on the isometry groups of manifolds with negative Ricci curvature with coauthors Xianzhe Dai and Zhongmin Shen. She also has major work with Peter Petersen on manifolds with integral Ricci curvature bounds.

Starting in 2000 Wei began working with Christina Sormani on limits of manifolds with lower Ricci curvature bounds using techniques of Jeff Cheeger and Tobias Colding, particularly Kenji Fukaya's metric measure convergence. The limit spaces in this setting are metric measure spaces. Wei was invited to present this work in a series of talks at the Seminaire Borel in Switzerland. Sormani and Wei also developed a notion called the covering spectrum of a Riemannian manifold. Dr. Wei has completed research with her student, Will Wylie, on smooth metric measure spaces and the Bakry–Emery Ricci tensor.

Guofang Wei was twice invited to present her work at the prestigious Geometry Festival both in 1996 and 2009.

== Outreach ==
In addition to conducting research, Guofang Wei has mentored the Dos Pueblos High School Math Team, which won second place in the International Shing-Tung Yau High School Math Awards competition in Beijing in 2008.

== Awards and honors ==
In 2013 she became a fellow of the American Mathematical Society, for "contributions to global Riemannian geometry and its relation with Ricci curvature".

== Selected publications ==
- "Examples of complete manifolds of positive Ricci curvature with nilpotent isometry groups", Bull. Amer. Math. Soc. Vol. 19, no. 1 (1988), 311–313. doi:10.1090/S0273-0979-1988-15653-4
- with X. Dai and Z. Shen, "Negative Ricci curvature and isometry group", Duke Math J. 76 (1994), 59–73. doi:10.1215/S0012-7094-94-07603-5
- with X. Dai and R. Ye, "Smoothing Riemannian manifolds with Ricci curvature bounds", MANUSCR MATH, vol. 90, no. 1 (1996), 49–61. doi:10.1007/BF02568293
- with P. Petersen, "Relative volume comparison with integral curvature bounds", GAFA 7 (1997), 1031–1045. doi:10.1007/s000390050036
- with C. Sormani, "The covering spectrum of a compact length space", Journal of Diff. Geom. 67 (2004), 35–77. doi:10.4310/jdg/1099587729
- with X. Dai and X. Wang, "On stability of Riemannian manifold with parallel spinors", Invent Math, vol. 161, no. 1, (2005) 151–176. doi:10.1007/s00222-004-0424-x
- with W. Wylie, "Comparison geometry for the Bakry–Emery Ricci tensor", Journal of Diff. Geom. 83, no. 2 (2009), 377–405. doi:10.4310/jdg/1261495336
