= Colin P. Rourke =

British mathematician (1943–2024)

Colin Rourke (1 January 1943 – 18 December 2024) was a British mathematician who worked in PL topology, low-dimensional topology, differential topology, group theory, relativity and cosmology. He was an emeritus professor at the Mathematics Institute at the University of Warwick and a founding editor of the journals Geometry & Topology and Algebraic & Geometric Topology, published by Mathematical Sciences Publishers, where he was a permanent member of its board of directors.

== Career ==
Rourke obtained his PhD at the University of Cambridge in 1965 under the direction of Christopher Zeeman. Most of his early work was carried out in collaboration with Brian Sanderson. They solved a number of outstanding problems: the provision of normal bundles for the PL category (which they called "Block bundles"), and the non-existence of normal microbundles (top and PL). In collaboration with Sandro Buoncristiano, he geometric interpretation for all (generalized) homology theories.

Rourke was an invited speaker at the International Congress of Mathematicians in 1970 at Nice. From 1976 to 1981, he was acting professor of pure mathematics at the Open University (on secondment from Warwick) where he oversaw the rewriting of the pure mathematics course.

Rourke died in 2024, aged 81.

== Poincaré Conjecture ==
In September 1986 Rourke and his graduate student, Eduardo Rêgo (later at University of Oporto), claimed to have solved the Poincaré Conjecture. Reaction by the topological community at the time was highly skeptical, and during a special seminar at University of California, Berkeley given by Rourke, a fatal error was found in the proof.

The part of the proof that was salvaged was a constructive characterization and enumeration of Heegaard diagrams for homotopy 3-spheres. A later-discovered algorithm of J. Hyam Rubinstein and Abigail Thompson identified when a homotopy 3-sphere was a topological 3-sphere. Together, the two algorithms provided an algorithm that would find a counterexample to the Poincaré Conjecture, if one existed.

In 2002, Martin Dunwoody posted a claimed proof of the Poincaré Conjecture. Rourke identified its fatal flaw.

== Geometry & Topology ==
In 1996, dissatisfied with the rapidly rising fees charged by the major publishers of mathematical research journals, Rourke decided to start his own journal, and was assisted by Robion Kirby, John Jones, and Brian Sanderson. The resulting journal, Geometry & Topology, became a leading journal in its field. It was joined in 1998 by a proceedings and monographs series, Geometry & Topology Monographs, and in 2000 by a sister journal, Algebraic & Geometric Topology. Rourke wrote the software and managed these publications until around 2005 when he cofounded Mathematical Sciences Publishers (with Rob Kirby) to take over the running.

== Cosmology ==
In 2000, Rourke started taking an interest in cosmology and posted his first paper on the topic on the arXiv preprint server in 2003. He collaborated with Robert MacKay, also of Warwick University, with papers on redshift, gamma-ray bursts and natural observer fields. He proposed a new paradigm for the universe, one that involves neither dark matter nor a Big Bang. This new paradigm was presented in "A new paradigm for the universe" (see bibliography).

The main idea is that the principal objects in the universe form a spectrum unified by the presence of a massive or hypermassive black hole. These objects are variously called quasars, active galaxies and spiral galaxies. The key to understanding their dynamics is angular momentum and the key tool is a proper formulation of "Mach's principle" using Sciama's ideas. This is added to standard general relativity in the form of hypothesized "inertial drag fields" which carry the forces that realize Mach's principle. This formulation solves the causal problems that occur in a naive formulation of the principle.

The new approach provides an explanation for the observed dynamics of spiral galaxies without needing dark matter and gives a framework that fits the observations of Halton Arp and others that show that quasars typically exhibit instrinsic redshift. An accessible version was published by World Scientific in it its "Knots and everything" series no 71, titled "The geometry of the universe".

== Bibliography ==
- Rourke, C. P.; Sanderson, B. J. (1972). Introduction to piecewise-linear topology. Ergebnisse der Mathematik und ihrer Grenzgebiete. Vol. 69. Springer-Verlag.
- Buoncristiano, S.; Rourke, C. P.; Sanderson, B. J (1976). A geometric approach to homology theory. London Mathematical Society Lecture Note Series. Vol. 18. Cambridge University Press.
- Rourke, Colin (2017), A new paradigm for the universe, https://arxiv.org/abs/astro-ph/0311033, http://msp.warwick.ac.uk/~cpr/paradigm/master.pdf, Amazon (Kindle and paperback versions)
- Rourke, Colin (2021), "The geometry of the universe", Ser. Knots Everything, 71, World Scientific Publishing Co. Pte. Ltd., Hackensack, NJ, 2021, xiii+253 pp. MR4375354 (Reviewer: Daniele Gregoris)
