= Analysis situs =

Analysis situs may refer to:

- Topology, originally called analysis situs, but the term is now obsolete
- "Analysis Situs" (paper), an 1895 article on topology by Henri Poincaré
- Analysis Situs (book), a 1922 book on topology by Oswald Veblen
