= Harmonic coordinates =

In Riemannian geometry, a branch of mathematics, harmonic coordinates are a certain kind of coordinate chart on a smooth manifold, determined by a Riemannian metric on the manifold. They are useful in many problems of geometric analysis due to their regularity properties.

In two dimensions, certain harmonic coordinates known as isothermal coordinates have been studied since the early 1800s. Harmonic coordinates in higher dimensions were developed initially in the context of Lorentzian geometry and general relativity by Albert Einstein and Cornelius Lanczos (see harmonic coordinate condition). Following the work of Dennis DeTurck and Jerry Kazdan in 1981, they began to play a significant role in the geometric analysis literature, although Idzhad Sabitov and S.Z. Šefel had made the same discovery five years earlier.

== Definition ==
Let (M, g) be a Riemannian manifold of dimension n. One says that a coordinate chart (x^{1}, ..., x^{n}), defined on an open subset U of M, is harmonic if each individual coordinate function x^{i} is a harmonic function on U. That is, one requires that

$$\Delta^g x^i = 0.\,$$

where ∆^{g} is the Laplace–Beltrami operator. Trivially, the coordinate system is harmonic if and only if, as a map U → ℝ^{n}, the coordinates are a harmonic map. A direct computation with the local definition of the Laplace-Beltrami operator shows that (x^{1}, ..., x^{n}) is a harmonic coordinate chart if and only if

$$\sum_{i=1}^n\sum_{j=1}^ng^{ij}\Gamma_{ij}^k = 0\text{ for all }k=1,\ldots,n,$$

in which Γ^{k}_{ij} are the Christoffel symbols of the given chart. Relative to a fixed "background" coordinate chart (V, y), one can view (x^{1}, ..., x^{n}) as a collection of functions x ∘ y^{−1} on an open subset of Euclidean space. The metric tensor relative to x is obtained from the metric tensor relative to y by a local calculation having to do with the first derivatives of x ∘ y^{−1}, and hence the Christoffel symbols relative to x are calculated from second derivatives of x ∘ y^{−1}. So both definitions of harmonic coordinates, as given above, have the qualitative character of having to do with second-order partial differential equations for the coordinate functions.

Using the definition of the Christoffel symbols, the above formula is equivalent to

$$2\sum_{i=1}^n\sum_{j=1}^ng^{ij}\frac{\partial g_{jk}}{\partial x^i}=\sum_{i=1}^n\sum_{j=1}^ng^{ij}\frac{\partial g_{ij}}{\partial x^k}.$$

== Existence and basic theory ==
Harmonic coordinates always exist (locally), a result which follows easily from standard results on the existence and regularity of solutions of elliptic partial differential equations. In particular, the equation ∆^{g}u^{j} = 0 has a solution in some open set around any given point p, such that u(p) and du_{p} are both prescribed.

The basic regularity theorem concerning the metric in harmonic coordinates is that if the components of the metric are in the Hölder space C^{k, α} when expressed in some coordinate chart, regardless of the smoothness of the chart itself, then the transition function from that coordinate chart to any harmonic coordinate chart will be in the Hölder space C^{k + 1, α}. In particular this implies that the metric will also be in C^{k, α} relative to harmonic coordinate charts.

As was first discovered by Cornelius Lanczos in 1922, relative to a harmonic coordinate chart, the Ricci curvature is given by

$$R_{ij}=-\frac{1}{2}\sum_{a,b=1}^n g^{ab}\frac{\partial^2g_{ij}}{\partial x^a\partial x^b}+\partial g\ast\partial g\ast g^{-1}\ast g^{-1}.$$

The fundamental aspect of this formula is that, for any fixed i and j, the first term on the right-hand side is an elliptic operator applied to the locally defined function g_{ij}. So it is automatic from elliptic regularity, and in particular the Schauder estimates, that if g is C^{2} and Ric(g) is C^{k, α} relative to a harmonic coordinate charts, then g is C^{k + 2, α} relative to the same chart. More generally, if g is C^{k, α} (with k larger than one) and Ric(g) is C^{l, α} relative to some coordinate charts, then the transition function to a harmonic coordinate chart will be C^{k + 1, α}, and so Ric(g) will be C^{min(l, k), α} in harmonic coordinate charts. So, by the previous result, g will be C^{min(l, k) + 2, α} in harmonic coordinate charts.

As a further application of Lanczos' formula, it follows that an Einstein metric is analytic in harmonic coordinates. In particular, this shows that any Einstein metric on a smooth manifold automatically determines an analytic structure on the manifold, given by the collection of harmonic coordinate charts.

Due to the above analysis, in discussing harmonic coordinates it is standard to consider Riemannian metrics which are at least twice-continuously differentiable. However, with the use of more exotic function spaces, the above results on existence and regularity of harmonic coordinates can be extended to settings where the metric has very weak regularity.

== Harmonic coordinates in asymptotically flat spaces ==
Harmonic coordinates were used by Robert Bartnik to understand the geometric properties of asymptotically flat Riemannian manifolds. Suppose that one has a complete Riemannian manifold (M, g), and that there is a compact subset K of M together with a diffeomorphism Φ from M ∖ K to ℝ^{n} ∖ B_{R}(0), such that Φ^{*}g, relative to the standard Euclidean metric δ on ℝ^{n} ∖ B_{R}(0), has eigenvalues which are uniformly bounded above and below by positive numbers, and such that (Φ^{*}g)(x) converges, in some precise sense, to δ as x diverges to infinity. Such a diffeomorphism is known as a structure at infinity or as asymptotically flat coordinates for (M, g).

Bartnik's primary result is that the collection of asymptotically flat coordinates (if nonempty) has a simple asymptotic structure, in that the transition function between any two asymptotically flat coordinates is approximated, near infinity, by an affine transformation. This is significant in establishing that the ADM energy of an asymptotically flat Riemannian manifold is a geometric invariant which does not depend on a choice of asymptotically flat coordinates.

The key tool in establishing this fact is the approximation of arbitrary asymptotically flat coordinates for (M, g) by asymptotically flat coordinates which are harmonic. The key technical work is in the establishment of a Fredholm theory for the Laplace-Beltrami operator, when acting between certain Banach spaces of functions on M which decay at infinity. Then, given any asymptotically flat coordinates Φ, from the fact that

$$\Delta^g\Phi^k=-\sum_{i=1}^n\sum_{j=1}^n g^{ij}\Gamma_{ij}^k,$$

which decays at infinity, it follows from the Fredholm theory that there are functions z^{k} which decay at infinity such that Δ^{g}Φ^{k} = Δ^{g}z^{k}, and hence that Φ^{k} − z^{k} are harmonic. This provides the desired asymptotically flat harmonic coordinates. Bartnik's primary result then follows from the fact that the vector space of asymptotically-decaying harmonic functions on M has dimension n + 1, which has the consequence that any two asymptotically flat harmonic coordinates on M are related by an affine transformation.

Bartnik's work is predicated on the existence of asymptotically flat coordinates. Building upon his methods, Shigetoshi Bando, Atsushi Kasue, and Hiraku Nakajima showed that the decay of the curvature in terms of the distance from a point, together with polynomial growth of the volume of large geodesic balls and the simple-connectivity of their complements, implies the existence of asymptotically flat coordinates. The essential point is that their geometric assumptions, via some of the results discussed below on harmonic radius, give good control over harmonic coordinates on regions near infinity. By the use of a partition of unity, these harmonic coordinates can be patched together to form a single coordinate chart, which is the main objective.

== Harmonic radius ==
A foundational result, due to Michael Anderson, is that given a smooth Riemannian manifold, any positive number α between 0 and 1 and any positive number Q, there is a number r which depends on α, on Q, on upper and lower bounds of the Ricci curvature, on the dimension, and on a positive lower bound for the injectivity radius, such that any geodesic ball of radius less than r is the domain of harmonic coordinates, relative to which the C^{1, α} size of g and the uniform closeness of g to the Euclidean metric are both controlled by Q. This can also be reformulated in terms of "norms" of pointed Riemannian manifolds, where the C^{1, α}-norm at a scale r corresponds to the optimal value of Q for harmonic coordinates whose domains are geodesic balls of radius r. Various authors have found versions of such "harmonic radius" estimates, both before and after Anderson's work. The essential aspect of the proof is the analysis, via standard methods of elliptic partial differential equations, for the Lanczos formula for the Ricci curvature in a harmonic coordinate chart.

So, loosely speaking, the use of harmonic coordinates shows that Riemannian manifolds can be covered by coordinate charts in which the local representations of the Riemannian metric are controlled only by the qualitative geometric behavior of the Riemannian manifold itself. Following ideas set forth by Jeff Cheeger in 1970, one can then consider sequences of Riemannian manifolds which are uniformly geometrically controlled, and using the coordinates, one can assemble a "limit" Riemannian manifold. Due to the nature of such "Riemannian convergence", it follows, for instance, that up to diffeomorphism there are only finitely many smooth manifolds of a given dimension which admit Riemannian metrics with a fixed bound on Ricci curvature and diameter, with a fixed positive lower bound on injectivity radius.

Such estimates on harmonic radius are also used to construct geometrically-controlled cutoff functions, and hence partitions of unity as well. For instance, to control the second covariant derivative of a function by a locally defined second partial derivative, it is necessary to control the first derivative of the local representation of the metric. Such constructions are fundamental in studying the basic aspects of Sobolev spaces on noncompact Riemannian manifolds.
