= Paternain =

Paternain is a surname found in Uruguay. Notable people with the surname include:

- Gabriel Paternain, Uruguayan mathematician
- Miguel Paternain (1894–1970), Uruguayan bishop
- Julia Paternain, bronze medallist at the 2025 World Championships in the marathon, daughter of Gabriel Paternain.

== See also ==
- Paternáin, a locality in northern Spain
