= Poincaré conjecture =

Theorem in geometric topology

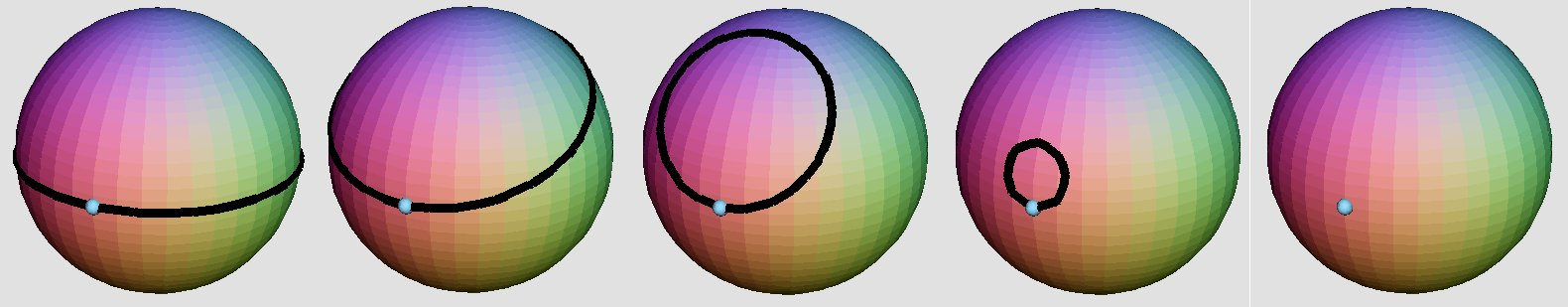
- A compact 2-dimensional surface without boundary is topologically homeomorphic to a 2-sphere if every loop can be continuously tightened to a point. The Poincaré conjecture asserts that the same is true for 3-dimensional spaces.
- Field: Geometric topology
- Conjectured by: Henri Poincaré
- Conjectured in: 1904
- First proof by: Grigori Perelman
- First proof in: 2002
- Implied by: Geometrization conjecture; Zeeman conjecture
- Generalizations: Generalized Poincaré conjecture

In the mathematical field of geometric topology, the Poincaré conjecture (UK: /ˈpwæ̃kæreɪ/, US: /ˌpwæ̃kɑːˈreɪ/, French: [pwɛ̃kaʁe]) is a theorem about the characterization of the 3-sphere (the hypersphere that bounds the 4-ball in four-dimensional space).

Originally conjectured by Henri Poincaré in 1904, the theorem concerns spaces that locally look like ordinary three-dimensional Euclidean space but which are finite in extent. Poincaré hypothesized that if such a space has the additional property that each loop in the space can be continuously tightened to a point, then it is necessarily a three-dimensional sphere. Attempts to resolve the conjecture drove much progress in the field of geometric topology during the 20th century.

The eventual proof built upon Richard S. Hamilton's program of using the Ricci flow to solve the problem. By developing a number of new techniques and results in the theory of Ricci flow, Grigori Perelman modified and completed Hamilton's program. In papers posted to the arXiv repository in 2002 and 2003, Perelman presented his work proving the Poincaré conjecture (and the more powerful geometrization conjecture of William Thurston). Over the next several years, several mathematicians studied his papers and produced detailed formulations of his work.

Hamilton and Perelman's work on the conjecture is widely recognized as a milestone of mathematical research. Hamilton was recognized with the Shaw Prize in 2011 and the Leroy P. Steele Prize for Seminal Contribution to Research in 2009. The journal Science marked Perelman's proof of the Poincaré conjecture as the scientific Breakthrough of the Year in 2006. The Clay Mathematics Institute, having included the Poincaré conjecture in their well-known Millennium Prize Problem list, offered Perelman their prize of US$1 million in 2010 for the conjecture's resolution. He declined the award, saying that Hamilton's contribution had been equal to his own. The Poincaré conjecture is the only Millennium Prize Problem confirmed to be solved by the Clay Institute.

== Overview ==
Neither of the two colored loops on this torus can be continuously tightened to a point. A torus is not homeomorphic to a sphere.

The Poincaré conjecture was a mathematical problem in the field of geometric topology. In terms of the vocabulary of that field, it says the following:

Poincaré conjecture.
Every three-dimensional topological manifold which is closed, connected, and has trivial fundamental group is homeomorphic to the three-dimensional sphere.

Familiar shapes, such as the surface of a ball (which is known in mathematics as the two-dimensional sphere) or of a torus, are two-dimensional. The surface of a ball has trivial fundamental group, meaning that any loop drawn on the surface can be continuously deformed to a single point. By contrast, the surface of a torus has nontrivial fundamental group, as there are loops on the surface which cannot be so deformed. Both are topological manifolds which are closed (meaning that they have no boundary and take up a finite region of space) and connected (meaning that they consist of a single piece). Two closed manifolds are said to be homeomorphic when it is possible for the points of one to be reallocated to the other in a continuous way. Because the (non)triviality of the fundamental group is known to be invariant under homeomorphism, it follows that the two-dimensional sphere and torus are not homeomorphic.

The two-dimensional analogue of the Poincaré conjecture says that any two-dimensional topological manifold which is closed and connected but non-homeomorphic to the two-dimensional sphere must possess a loop which cannot be continuously contracted to a point. (This is illustrated by the example of the torus, as above.) This analogue is known to be true via the classification of closed and connected two-dimensional topological manifolds, which was understood in various forms since the 1860s. In higher dimensions, the closed and connected topological manifolds do not have a straightforward classification, precluding an easy resolution of the Poincaré conjecture.

== History ==
=== Poincaré's question ===
In the 1800s, Bernhard Riemann and Enrico Betti initiated the study of topological invariants of manifolds. They introduced the Betti numbers, which associate to any manifold a list of nonnegative integers. Riemann showed that a closed connected two-dimensional manifold is fully characterized by its Betti numbers. As part of his 1895 paper Analysis Situs (announced in 1892), Poincaré showed that Riemann's result does not extend to higher dimensions. To do this he introduced the fundamental group as a novel topological invariant, and exhibited examples of three-dimensional manifolds which have the same Betti numbers but distinct fundamental groups. He posed the question of whether the fundamental group is sufficient to topologically characterize a manifold (of given dimension), although he made no attempt to pursue the answer, saying only that it would "demand lengthy and difficult study".

The primary purpose of Poincaré's paper was the interpretation of the Betti numbers in terms of his newly introduced homology groups, along with the Poincaré duality theorem on the symmetry of Betti numbers. Following criticism of the completeness of his arguments, he released a number of subsequent "supplements" to enhance and correct his work. The closing remark of his second supplement, published in 1900, said:

In order to avoid making this work too prolonged, I confine myself to stating the following theorem, the proof of which will require further developments:

Each polyhedron which has all its Betti numbers equal to 1 and all its tables $T_q$ orientable is simply connected, i.e., homeomorphic to a hypersphere.

(In a modern language, taking note of the fact that Poincaré is using the terminology of simple-connectedness in an unusual way, this says that a closed connected oriented manifold with the homology of a sphere must be homeomorphic to a sphere.) This modified his negative generalization of Riemann's work in two ways. Firstly, he was now making use of the full homology groups and not only the Betti numbers. Secondly, he narrowed the scope of the problem from asking if an arbitrary manifold is characterized by topological invariants to asking whether the sphere can be so characterized.

However, after publication he found his announced theorem to be incorrect. In his fifth and final supplement, published in 1904, he proved this with the counterexample of the Poincaré homology sphere, which is a closed connected three-dimensional manifold which has the homology of the sphere but whose fundamental group has 120 elements. This example made it clear that homology is not powerful enough to characterize the topology of a manifold. In the closing remarks of the fifth supplement, Poincaré modified his erroneous theorem to use the fundamental group instead of homology:

One question remains to be dealt with: is it possible for the fundamental group of V to reduce to the identity without V being simply connected? [...] However, this question would carry us too far away.

In this remark, as in the closing remark of the second supplement, Poincaré used the term "simply connected" in a way which is at odds with modern usage, as well as his own 1895 definition of the term. (According to modern usage, Poincaré's question is a tautology, asking if it is possible for a manifold to be simply connected without being simply connected.) However, as can be inferred from context, Poincaré was asking whether the triviality of the fundamental group uniquely characterizes the sphere.

Throughout the work of Riemann, Betti, and Poincaré, the topological notions in question are not defined or used in a way that would be recognized as precise from a modern perspective. Even the key notion of a "manifold" was not used in a consistent way in Poincaré's own work, and there was frequent confusion between the notion of a topological manifold, a PL manifold, and a smooth manifold. For this reason, it is not possible to read Poincaré's questions unambiguously. It is only through the formalization and vocabulary of topology as developed by later mathematicians that Poincaré's closing question has been understood as the "Poincaré conjecture" as stated in the preceding section.

However, despite its usual phrasing in the form of a conjecture, proposing that all manifolds of a certain type are homeomorphic to the sphere, Poincaré only posed an open-ended question, without venturing to conjecture one way or the other. Moreover, there is no evidence as to which way he believed his question would be answered.

=== Solutions ===
In the 1930s, J. H. C. Whitehead claimed a proof but then retracted it. In the process, he discovered some examples of simply-connected (indeed contractible, i.e. homotopically equivalent to a point) non-compact 3-manifolds not homeomorphic to $\R^3$, the prototype of which is now called the Whitehead manifold.

In the 1950s and 1960s, other mathematicians attempted proofs of the conjecture only to discover that they contained flaws. Influential mathematicians such as Georges de Rham, R. H. Bing, Wolfgang Haken, Edwin E. Moise, and Christos Papakyriakopoulos attempted to prove the conjecture. In 1958, R. H. Bing proved a weak version of the Poincaré conjecture: if every simple closed curve of a compact 3-manifold is contained in a 3-ball, then the manifold is homeomorphic to the 3-sphere. Bing also described some of the pitfalls in trying to prove the Poincaré conjecture.

Włodzimierz Jakobsche showed in 1978 that, if the Bing–Borsuk conjecture is true in dimension 3, then the Poincaré conjecture must also be true.

Over time, the conjecture gained the reputation of being particularly tricky to tackle. John Milnor commented that sometimes the errors in false proofs can be "rather subtle and difficult to detect". Work on the conjecture improved understanding of 3-manifolds. Experts in the field were often reluctant to announce proofs and tended to view any such announcement with scepticism. The 1980s and 1990s witnessed some well-publicized fallacious proofs (which were not actually published in peer-reviewed form).

An exposition of attempts to prove this conjecture can be found in the non-technical book Poincaré's Prize by George Szpiro.

=== Dimensions ===
The classification of closed surfaces gives an affirmative answer to the analogous question in two dimensions. For dimensions greater than three, one can pose the Generalized Poincaré conjecture: is a homotopy n-sphere homeomorphic to the n-sphere? A stronger assumption than simply-connectedness is necessary; in dimensions four and higher there are simply-connected, closed manifolds which are not homotopy equivalent to an n-sphere.

Historically, while the conjecture in dimension three seemed plausible, the generalized conjecture was thought to be false. In 1961, Stephen Smale shocked mathematicians by proving the Generalized Poincaré conjecture for dimensions greater than four and extended his techniques to prove the fundamental h-cobordism theorem. In 1982, Michael Freedman proved the Poincaré conjecture in four dimensions. Freedman's work left open the possibility that there is a smooth four-manifold homeomorphic to the four-sphere which is not diffeomorphic to the four-sphere. This so-called smooth Poincaré conjecture, in dimension four, remains open and is thought to be very difficult. Milnor's exotic spheres show that the smooth Poincaré conjecture is false in dimension seven, for example.

These earlier successes in higher dimensions left the case of three dimensions in limbo. The Poincaré conjecture was essentially true in both dimension four and all higher dimensions for substantially different reasons. In dimension three, the conjecture had an uncertain reputation until the geometrization conjecture put it into a framework governing all 3-manifolds. John Morgan wrote:

It is my view that before Thurston's work on hyperbolic 3-manifolds and ... the Geometrization conjecture there was no consensus among the experts as to whether the Poincaré conjecture was true or false. After Thurston's work, notwithstanding the fact that it had no direct bearing on the Poincaré conjecture, a consensus developed that the Poincaré conjecture (and the Geometrization conjecture) were true.

=== Hamilton's program and solution ===
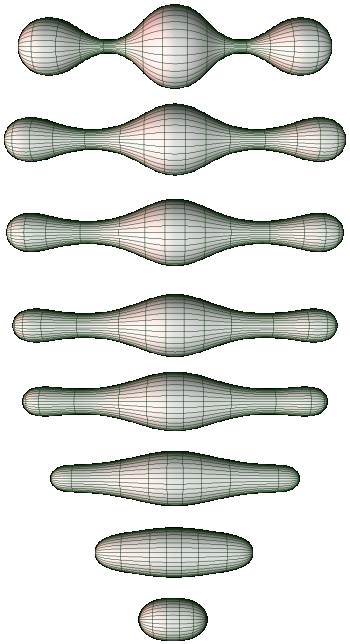
Several stages of the Ricci flow on a two-dimensional manifold

Hamilton's program was started in his 1982 paper in which he introduced the Ricci flow on a manifold and showed how to use it to prove some special cases of the Poincaré conjecture. In the following years, he extended this work but was unable to prove the conjecture. The actual solution was not found until Grigori Perelman published his papers.

In late 2002 and 2003, Perelman posted three papers on arXiv. In these papers, he sketched a proof of the Poincaré conjecture and a more general conjecture, Thurston's geometrization conjecture, completing the Ricci flow program outlined earlier by Richard S. Hamilton.

From May to July 2006, several groups presented papers that filled in the details of Perelman's proof of the Poincaré conjecture, as follows:

- Bruce Kleiner and John W. Lott posted a paper on arXiv in May 2006 which filled in the details of Perelman's proof of the geometrization conjecture, following partial versions which had been publicly available since 2003. Their manuscript was published in the journal Geometry and Topology in 2008. A small number of corrections were made in 2011 and 2013; for instance, the first version of their published paper made use of an incorrect version of Hamilton's compactness theorem for Ricci flow.
- Huai-Dong Cao and Xi-Ping Zhu published a paper in the June 2006 issue of the Asian Journal of Mathematics with an exposition of the complete proof of the Poincaré and geometrization conjectures. The opening paragraph of their paper stated

In this paper, we shall present the Hamilton-Perelman theory of Ricci flow. Based on it, we shall give the first written account of a complete proof of the Poincaré conjecture and the geometrization conjecture of Thurston. While the complete work is an accumulated efforts of many geometric analysts, the major contributors are unquestionably Hamilton and Perelman.

Some observers interpreted Cao and Zhu as taking credit for Perelman's work. They later posted a revised version, with new wording, on arXiv. In addition, a page of their exposition was essentially identical to a page in one of Kleiner and Lott's early publicly available drafts; this was also amended in the revised version, together with an apology by the journal's editorial board.

- John Morgan and Gang Tian posted a paper on arXiv in July 2006 which gave a detailed proof of just the Poincaré Conjecture (which is somewhat easier than the full geometrization conjecture) and expanded this to a book.

All three groups found that the gaps in Perelman's papers were minor and could be filled in using his own techniques.

On August 22, 2006, the ICM awarded Perelman the Fields Medal for his work on the Ricci flow, but Perelman refused the medal. John Morgan spoke at the ICM on the Poincaré conjecture on August 24, 2006, declaring that "in 2003, Perelman solved [sic] the Poincaré Conjecture".

In December 2006, the journal Science honored the proof of Poincaré conjecture as the Breakthrough of the Year and featured it on its cover.

== Ricci flow with surgery ==
Hamilton's program for proving the Poincaré conjecture involves first putting a Riemannian metric on the unknown simply connected closed 3-manifold. The basic idea is to try to "improve" this metric; for example, if the metric can be improved enough so that it has constant positive curvature, then according to classical results in Riemannian geometry, it must be the 3-sphere. Hamilton prescribed the "Ricci flow equations" for improving the metric;

$$\partial_t g_{ij}=-2 R_{ij}$$

where g is the metric and R its Ricci curvature, and one hopes that, as the time t increases, the manifold becomes easier to understand. Ricci flow expands the negative curvature part of the manifold and contracts the positive curvature part.

In some cases, Hamilton showed that this works; for example, his original breakthrough was to show that if the Riemannian manifold has positive Ricci curvature everywhere, then the above procedure can only be followed for a bounded interval of parameter values, $t\in [0,T)$ with $T<\infty$, and more significantly, that there are numbers $c_t$ such that as $t\nearrow T$, the Riemannian metrics $c_tg(t)$ smoothly converge to one of constant positive curvature. According to classical Riemannian geometry, the only simply-connected compact manifold which can support a Riemannian metric of constant positive curvature is the sphere. So, in effect, Hamilton showed a special case of the Poincaré conjecture: if a compact simply-connected 3-manifold supports a Riemannian metric of positive Ricci curvature, then it must be diffeomorphic to the 3-sphere.

If, instead, one only has an arbitrary Riemannian metric, the Ricci flow equations must lead to more complicated singularities. Perelman's major achievement was to show that, if one takes a certain perspective, if they appear in finite time, these singularities can only look like shrinking spheres or cylinders. With a quantitative understanding of this phenomenon, he cuts the manifold along the singularities, splitting the manifold into several pieces and then continues with the Ricci flow on each of these pieces. This procedure is known as Ricci flow with surgery.

Perelman provided a separate argument based on curve-shortening flow to show that, on a simply-connected compact 3-manifold, any solution of the Ricci flow with surgery becomes extinct in finite time. An alternative argument, based on the min-max theory of minimal surfaces and geometric measure theory, was provided by Tobias Colding and William Minicozzi. Hence, in the simply-connected context, the above finite-time phenomena of Ricci flow with surgery is all that is relevant. In fact, this is even true if the fundamental group is a free product of finite groups and cyclic groups.

This condition on the fundamental group turns out to be necessary and sufficient for finite time extinction. It is equivalent to saying that the prime decomposition of the manifold has no acyclic components and turns out to be equivalent to the condition that all geometric pieces of the manifold have geometries based on the two Thurston geometries $S^2 \times \mathbf R$ and $S^3$. In the context that one makes no assumption about the fundamental group whatsoever, Perelman made a further technical study of the limit of the manifold for infinitely large times, and in so doing, proved Thurston's geometrization conjecture: at large times, the manifold has a thick-thin decomposition, whose thick piece has a hyperbolic structure, and whose thin piece is a graph manifold. Due to Perelman's and Colding and Minicozzi's results, however, these further results are unnecessary in order to prove the Poincaré conjecture.

== Solution ==
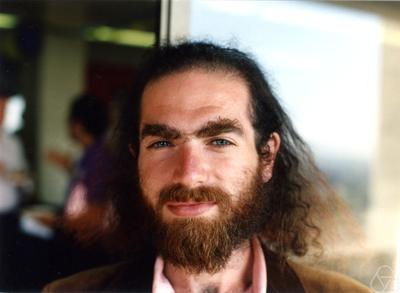
Grigori Perelman

On November 11, 2002, Russian mathematician Grigori Perelman posted the first of a series of three eprints on arXiv outlining a solution of the Poincaré conjecture. Perelman's proof uses a modified version of a Ricci flow program developed by Richard S. Hamilton. In August 2006, Perelman was awarded, but declined, the Fields Medal (worth $15,000 CAD) for his work on the Ricci flow. On March 18, 2010, the Clay Mathematics Institute awarded Perelman the $1 million Millennium Prize in recognition of his proof. Perelman rejected that prize as well.

Perelman proved the conjecture by deforming the manifold using the Ricci flow (which behaves similarly to the heat equation that describes the diffusion of heat through an object). The Ricci flow usually deforms the manifold towards a rounder shape, except for some cases where it stretches the manifold apart from itself towards what are known as singularities. Perelman and Hamilton then chop the manifold at the singularities (a process in topology called "surgery", which Max Dehn had used, already, to make Poincaré's homology sphere from a 2-sphere.), causing the separate pieces to form into ball-like shapes. Major steps in the proof involve showing how manifolds behave when they are deformed by the Ricci flow, examining what sort of singularities develop, determining whether this surgery process can be completed, and establishing that the surgery need not be repeated infinitely many times.

The first step is to deform the manifold using the Ricci flow. The Ricci flow was defined by Richard S. Hamilton as a way to deform manifolds. The formula for the Ricci flow is an imitation of the heat equation, which describes the way heat flows in a solid. Like the heat flow, Ricci flow tends towards uniform behavior. Unlike the heat flow, the Ricci flow could run into singularities and stop functioning. A singularity in a manifold is a place where it is not differentiable: like a corner or a cusp or a pinching. The Ricci flow was only defined for smooth differentiable manifolds. Hamilton used the Ricci flow to prove that some compact manifolds were diffeomorphic to spheres, and he hoped to apply it to prove the Poincaré conjecture. He needed to understand the singularities.

Hamilton created a list of possible singularities that could form, but he was concerned that some singularities might lead to difficulties. He wanted to cut the manifold at the singularities and paste in caps and then run the Ricci flow again, so he needed to understand the singularities and show that certain kinds of singularities do not occur. Perelman discovered the singularities were all very simple: consider that a cylinder is formed by 'stretching' a circle along a line in another dimension, repeating that process with spheres instead of circles essentially gives the form of the singularities. Perelman proved this using something called the "Reduced Volume", which is closely related to an eigenvalue of a certain elliptic equation.

Sometimes, an otherwise complicated operation reduces to multiplication by a scalar (a number). Such numbers are called eigenvalues of that operation. Eigenvalues are closely related to vibration frequencies and are used in analyzing a famous problem: can you hear the shape of a drum? Essentially, an eigenvalue is like a note being played by the manifold. Perelman proved this note goes up as the manifold is deformed by the Ricci flow. This helped him eliminate some of the more troublesome singularities that had concerned Hamilton, particularly the cigar soliton solution, which looked like a strand sticking out of a manifold with nothing on the other side. In essence, Perelman showed that all the strands that form can be cut and capped and none stick out on one side only.

Completing the proof, Perelman takes any compact, simply connected, three-dimensional manifold without boundary and starts to run the Ricci flow. This deforms the manifold into round pieces with strands running between them. He cuts the strands and continues deforming the manifold until, eventually, he is left with a collection of round three-dimensional spheres. Then, he rebuilds the original manifold by connecting the spheres together with three-dimensional cylinders, morphs them into a round shape, and sees that, despite all the initial confusion, the manifold was, in fact, homeomorphic to a sphere.

One immediate question posed was how one could be sure that infinitely many cuts are not necessary. This was raised due to the cutting potentially progressing forever. Perelman proved this cannot happen by using minimal surfaces on the manifold. A minimal surface is one on which any local deformation increases area; a familiar example is a soap film spanning a bent loop of wire. Hamilton had shown that the area of a minimal surface decreases as the manifold undergoes Ricci flow. Perelman verified what happened to the area of the minimal surface when the manifold was sliced. He proved that, eventually, the area is so small that any cut after the area is that small can only be chopping off three-dimensional spheres and not more complicated pieces. This is described as a battle with a Hydra by Sormani in Szpiro's book cited below. This last part of the proof appeared in Perelman's third and final paper on the subject.

== See also ==
- Manifold Destiny
