= Oswald Veblen Prize in Geometry =

Award of the American Mathematical Society

- Awarded for: Notable research in geometry or topology
- Country: United States
- Presented by: American Mathematical Society (AMS)
- Reward: US $5,000
- First award: 1964
- Website: www.ams.org/prizes/veblen-prize.html

The Oswald Veblen Prize in Geometry is an award granted by the American Mathematical Society for notable research in geometry or topology. It was funded in 1961 in memory of Oswald Veblen and first issued in 1964. The Veblen Prize is now worth US$5000, and is awarded every three years.

The first seven prize winners were awarded for works in topology. Jim Simons and William Thurston were the first ones to receive it for works in geometry. As of 2025, there have been thirty-nine prize recipients.

== List of recipients ==
Source: Notices of the American Mathematical Society

- 1964 Christos Papakyriakopoulos, for his papers

"On solid tori", and
"On Dehn's lemma and the asphericity of knots".

- 1964 Raoul Bott, for his papers

"The space of loops on a Lie group", and
"The stable homotopy of the classical groups".

- 1966 Stephen Smale "for his contributions to various aspects of differential topology."
- 1966 Morton Brown and Barry Mazur "for their work on the generalized Schoenflies theorem."
- 1971 Robion Kirby, for his paper

"Stable homeomorphisms and the annulus conjecture".

- 1971 Dennis Sullivan for his work on the Hauptvermutung summarized in the paper
  "On the Hauptvermutung for manifolds".
- 1976 William Thurston "for his work on foliations".
- 1976 James Simons "for his work on minimal varieties and characteristic forms".
- 1981 Mikhail Gromov "for his work relating topological and geometric properties of Riemannian manifolds."
- 1981 Shing-Tung Yau "for his work in nonlinear partial differential equations, his contributions to the topology of differentiable manifolds, and for his work on the complex Monge-Ampère equation on compact complex manifolds."
- 1986 Michael Freedman "for his work in differential geometry and, in particular, the solution of the four-dimensional Poincaré conjecture."
- 1991 Andrew Casson "for his work on the topology of low-dimensional manifolds."
- 1991 Clifford Taubes "for his foundational work in Yang-Mills theory."
- 1996 Richard S. Hamilton "for his continuing study of the Ricci flow and related parabolic equations for a Riemannian metric."
- 1996 Gang Tian "for his contributions to geometric analysis."
- 2001 Jeff Cheeger for:

Families index for manifolds with boundary, superconnections, and cones. I. Families of manifolds with boundary and Dirac operators. J. Funct. Anal. 89 (1990), no. 2, 313–363. (with Jean-Michel Bismut)
Families index for manifolds with boundary, superconnections and cones. II. The Chern character. J. Funct. Anal. 90 (1990), no. 2, 306–354. (with Jean-Michel Bismut)
Lower bounds on Ricci curvature and the almost rigidity of warped products. Ann. of Math. (2) 144 (1996), no. 1, 189–237. (with Tobias Colding)
On the structure of spaces with Ricci curvature bounded below. I. J. Differential Geom. 46 (1997), no. 3, 406–480. (with Tobias Colding)

- 2001 Yakov Eliashberg for:

Combinatorial methods in symplectic geometry. Proceedings of the International Congress of Mathematicians, Vol. 1, 2 (Berkeley, Calif., 1986), 531–539, Amer. Math. Soc., Providence, RI, 1987.
Classification of overtwisted contact structures on 3-manifolds. Invent. Math. 98 (1989), no. 3, 623–637.

- 2001 Michael J. Hopkins for:

Nilpotence and stable homotopy theory. I. Ann. of Math. (2) 128 (1988), no. 2, 207–241. (with Ethan Devinatz and Jeffrey Smith)
The rigid analytic period mapping, Lubin-Tate space, and stable homotopy theory. Bull. Amer. Math. Soc. (N.S.) 30 (1994), no. 1, 76–86. (with Benedict Gross)
Equivariant vector bundles on the Lubin-Tate moduli space. Topology and representation theory (Evanston, IL, 1992), 23–88, Contemp. Math., 158, Amer. Math. Soc., Providence, RI, 1994. (with Benedict Gross)
Elliptic spectra, the Witten genus and the theorem of the cube. Invent. Math. 146 (2001), no. 3, 595–687. (with Matthew Ando and Neil Strickland)
Nilpotence and stable homotopy theory. II. Ann. of Math. (2) 148 (1998), no. 1, 1–49. (with Jeffrey Smith)

- 2004 David Gabai
- 2007 Peter Kronheimer and Tomasz Mrowka for:

The genus of embedded surfaces in the projective plane. Math. Res. Lett. 1 (1994), no. 6, 797–808.
Embedded surfaces and the structure of Donaldson's polynomial invariants. J. Differential Geom. 41 (1995), no. 3, 573–734.
Witten's conjecture and property P. Geom. Topol. 8 (2004), 295–310.

- 2007 Peter Ozsváth and Zoltán Szabó for:

Holomorphic disks and topological invariants for closed three-manifolds. Ann. of Math. (2) 159 (2004), no. 3, 1027–1158.
Holomorphic disks and three-manifold invariants: properties and applications. Ann. of Math. (2) 159 (2004), no. 3, 1159–1245.
Holomorphic disks and genus bounds. Geom. Topol. 8 (2004), 311–334.

- 2010 Tobias Colding and William Minicozzi II for:

The space of embedded minimal surfaces of fixed genus in a 3-manifold. I. Estimates off the axis for disks. Ann. of Math. (2) 160 (2004), no. 1, 27–68.
The space of embedded minimal surfaces of fixed genus in a 3-manifold. II. Multi-valued graphs in disks. Ann. of Math. (2) 160 (2004), no. 1, 69–92.
The space of embedded minimal surfaces of fixed genus in a 3-manifold. III. Planar domains. Ann. of Math. (2) 160 (2004), no. 2, 523–572.
The space of embedded minimal surfaces of fixed genus in a 3-manifold. IV. Locally simply connected. Ann. of Math. (2) 160 (2004), no. 2, 573–615.
The Calabi-Yau conjectures for embedded surfaces. Ann. of Math. (2) 167 (2008), no. 1, 211–243.

- 2010 Paul Seidel for:

A long exact sequence for symplectic Floer cohomology. Topology 42 (2003), no. 5, 1003–1063.
The symplectic topology of Ramanujam's surface. Comment. Math. Helv. 80 (2005), no. 4, 859–881. (with Ivan Smith)
Fukaya categories and Picard-Lefschetz theory. Zurich Lectures in Advanced Mathematics. European Mathematical Society (EMS), Zürich, 2008. viii+326 pp.
Exact Lagrangian submanifolds in simply-connected cotangent bundles. Invent. Math. 172 (2008), no. 1, 1–27. (with Kenji Fukaya and Ivan Smith)

- 2013 Ian Agol for:

Lower bounds on volumes of hyperbolic Haken 3-manifolds. With an appendix by Nathan Dunfield. J. Amer. Math. Soc. 20 (2007), no. 4, 1053–1077. (with Peter Storm and William Thurston)
Criteria for virtual fibering. J. Topol. 1 (2008), no. 2, 269–284.
Residual finiteness, QCERF and fillings of hyperbolic groups. Geom. Topol. 13 (2009), no. 2, 1043–1073. (with Daniel Groves and Jason Fox Manning)

- 2013 Daniel Wise for:

Subgroup separability of graphs of free groups with cyclic edge groups. Q. J. Math. 51 (2000), no. 1, 107–129.
The residual finiteness of negatively curved polygons of finite groups. Invent. Math. 149 (2002), no. 3, 579–617.
Special cube complexes. Geom. Funct. Anal. 17 (2008), no. 5, 1551–1620. (with Frédéric Haglund)
A combination theorem for special cube complexes. Ann. of Math. (2) 176 (2012), no. 3, 1427–1482. (with Frédéric Haglund)

- 2016 Fernando Codá Marques and André Neves for:

Min-max theory and the Willmore conjecture. Ann. of Math. (2) 179 (2014), no. 2, 683–782.
Min-max theory and the energy of links. J. Amer. Math. Soc. 29 (2016), no. 2, 561–578. (with Ian Agol)
Existence of infinitely many minimal hypersurfaces in positive Ricci curvature. Invent. Math. 209 (2017), no. 2, 577–616.

- 2019 Xiuxiong Chen, Simon Donaldson and Song Sun for:

Kähler-Einstein metrics on Fano manifolds. I: Approximation of metrics with cone singularities. J. Amer. Math. Soc. 28 (2015), no. 1, 183–197.
Kähler-Einstein metrics on Fano manifolds. II: Limits with cone angle less than 2π. J. Amer. Math. Soc. 28 (2015), no. 1, 199–234.
Kähler-Einstein metrics on Fano manifolds. III: Limits as cone angle approaches 2π and completion of the main proof. J. Amer. Math. Soc. 28 (2015), no. 1, 235–278.

- 2022 Michael A. Hill, Michael J. Hopkins, and Douglas Ravenel for:

On the nonexistence of elements of Kervaire invariant one. Ann. of Math. (2) 184 (2016), no. 1, 1-262.

- 2025 Soheyla Feyzbakhsh and Richard Thomas for:

Curve counting and S-duality, Épijournal de Géométrie Algébrique - arXiv:2007.03037
Rank r DT theory from rank 0, Duke Mathematical Journal - arXiv:2103.02915
Rank r DT theory from rank 1, Journal of the American Mathematical Society - arXiv:2108.02828

== See also ==
- List of mathematics awards
