= Asymptotic dimension =

Concept in metric geometry

In metric geometry, asymptotic dimension of a metric space is a large-scale analog of Lebesgue covering dimension. The notion of asymptotic dimension was introduced by Mikhail Gromov in his 1993 monograph Asymptotic invariants of infinite groups in the context of geometric group theory, as a quasi-isometry invariant of finitely generated groups. As shown by Guoliang Yu, finitely generated groups of finite homotopy type with finite asymptotic dimension satisfy the Novikov conjecture. Asymptotic dimension has important applications in geometric analysis and index theory.

== Formal definition ==
Let $X$ be a metric space and $n\ge 0$ be an integer. We say that $\operatorname{asdim}(X)\le n$ if for every $R\ge 1$ there exists a uniformly bounded cover $\mathcal U$ of $X$ such that every closed $R$-ball in $X$ intersects at most $n+1$ subsets from $\mathcal U$. Here 'uniformly bounded' means that $\sup_{U\in \mathcal U} \operatorname{diam}(U) <\infty$.

We then define the asymptotic dimension $\operatorname{asdim}(X)$ as the smallest integer $n\ge 0$ such that $\operatorname{asdim}(X)\le n$, if at least one such $n$ exists, and define $\operatorname{asdim}(X):=\infty$ otherwise.

Also, one says that a family $(X_i)_{i\in I}$ of metric spaces satisfies $\operatorname{asdim}(X)\le n$ uniformly if for every $R\ge 1$ and every $i\in I$ there exists a cover $\mathcal U_i$ of $X_i$ by sets of diameter at most $D(R)<\infty$ (independent of $i$) such that every closed $R$-ball in $X_i$ intersects at most $n+1$ subsets from $\mathcal U_i$.

== Examples ==
- If $X$ is a metric space of bounded diameter then $\operatorname{asdim}(X)=0$.
- $\operatorname{asdim}(\mathbb R)=\operatorname{asdim}(\mathbb Z)=1$.
- $\operatorname{asdim}(\mathbb R^n)=n$.
- $\operatorname{asdim}(\mathbb H^n)=n$.

== Properties ==
- If $Y\subseteq X$ is a subspace of a metric space $X$, then $\operatorname{asdim}(Y)\le \operatorname{asdim}(X)$.
- For any metric spaces $X$ and $Y$ one has $\operatorname{asdim}(X\times Y)\le \operatorname{asdim}(X)+\operatorname{asdim}(Y)$.
- If $A,B\subseteq X$ then $\operatorname{asdim}(A\cup B)\le \max\{\operatorname{asdim}(A), \operatorname{asdim}(B)\}$.
- If $f:Y\to X$ is a coarse embedding (e.g. a quasi-isometric embedding), then $\operatorname{asdim}(Y)\le \operatorname{asdim}(X)$.
- If $X$ and $Y$ are coarsely equivalent metric spaces (e.g. quasi-isometric metric spaces), then $\operatorname{asdim}(X)= \operatorname{asdim}(Y)$.
- If $X$ is a real tree then $\operatorname{asdim}(X)\le 1$.
- Let $f : X\to Y$ be a Lipschitz map from a geodesic metric space $X$ to a metric space $Y$ . Suppose that for every $r > 0$ the set family $\{f^{-1}(B_r(y))\}_{y\in Y}$ satisfies the inequality $\operatorname{asdim} \le n$ uniformly. Then $\operatorname{asdim}(X)\le \operatorname{asdim}(Y) +n.$ See
- If $X$ is a metric space with $\operatorname{asdim}(X)<\infty$ then $X$ admits a coarse (uniform) embedding into a Hilbert space.
- If $X$ is a metric space of bounded geometry with $\operatorname{asdim}(X)\le n$ then $X$ admits a coarse embedding into a product of $n+1$ locally finite simplicial trees.

== Asymptotic dimension in geometric group theory ==
Asymptotic dimension achieved particular prominence in geometric group theory after a 1998 paper of Guoliang Yu , which proved that if $G$ is a finitely generated group of finite homotopy type (that is with a classifying space of the homotopy type of a finite CW-complex) such that $\operatorname{asdim}(G)<\infty$, then $G$ satisfies the Novikov conjecture. As was subsequently shown, finitely generated groups with finite asymptotic dimension are topologically amenable, i.e. satisfy Guoliang Yu's Property A introduced in and equivalent to the exactness of the reduced C*-algebra of the group.

- If $G$ is a word-hyperbolic group then $\operatorname{asdim}(G)<\infty$.
- If $G$ is relatively hyperbolic with respect to subgroups $H_1,\dots, H_k$ each of which has finite asymptotic dimension then $\operatorname{asdim}(G)<\infty$.
- $\operatorname{asdim}(\mathbb Z^n)=n$.
- If $H\le G$, where $H,G$ are finitely generated, then $\operatorname{asdim}(H)\le \operatorname{asdim}(G)$.
- For Thompson's group F we have $\operatorname{asdim}(F)=\infty$ since $F$ contains subgroups isomorphic to $\mathbb Z^n$ for arbitrarily large $n$.
- If $G$ is the fundamental group of a finite graph of groups $\mathbb A$ with underlying graph $A$ and finitely generated vertex groups, then

$$\operatorname{asdim}(G)\le 1+ \max_{v\in VY} \operatorname{asdim} (A_v).$$

- Mapping class groups of orientable finite type surfaces have finite asymptotic dimension.
- Let $G$ be a connected Lie group and let $\Gamma\le G$ be a finitely generated discrete subgroup. Then $\operatorname{asdim}(\Gamma)<\infty$.
- The fundamental group of a compact 3-manifold has asymptotic dimension at most 3.
- It is not known if $Out(F_n)$ has finite asymptotic dimension for $n>2$.
