= Algebraic & Geometric Topology =

- Discipline: Topology
- Language: English
- Edited by: John Etnyre, Kathryn Hess

Publication details
- History: 2001–present
- Publisher: Mathematical Sciences Publishers
- Frequency: Quarterly
- Impact factor: 0.709 (2018)

Standard abbreviations
- ISO 4: Algebr. Geom. Topol.

Indexing
- ISSN: 1472-2747 (print); 1472-2739 (web)
- LCCN: 2001233119

Links
- Journal homepage; Online access

Algebraic & Geometric Topology is a peer-reviewed mathematics journal published quarterly by Mathematical Sciences Publishers. Established in 2001, the journal publishes articles on topology. Its 2018 MCQ was 0.82, and its 2018 impact factor was 0.709.
