= Splitting theorem =

Theorem in differential geometry

In the mathematical field of differential geometry, there are various splitting theorems on when a pseudo-Riemannian manifold can be given as a metric product. The best-known is the Cheeger–Gromoll splitting theorem for Riemannian manifolds, although there has also been research into splitting of Lorentzian manifolds.

== Cheeger and Gromoll's Riemannian splitting theorem ==
Any connected Riemannian manifold M has an underlying metric space structure, and this allows the definition of a geodesic line as a map c: ℝ → M such that the distance from c(s) to c(t) equals | t − s | for arbitrary s and t. This is to say that the restriction of c to any bounded interval is a curve of minimal length that connects its endpoints.

In 1971, Jeff Cheeger and Detlef Gromoll proved that if a geodesically complete and connected Riemannian manifold of nonnegative Ricci curvature contains any geodesic line, then it must split isometrically as the product of a complete Riemannian manifold with ℝ. The proof was later simplified by Jost Eschenburg and Ernst Heintze. In 1936, Stefan Cohn-Vossen had originally formulated and proved the theorem in the case of two-dimensional manifolds, and Victor Toponogov had extended Cohn-Vossen's work to higher dimensions, under the special condition of nonnegative sectional curvature.

The proof can be summarized as follows. The condition of a geodesic line allows for two Busemann functions to be defined. These can be considered a normalized Riemannian distance function to the two endpoints of the line. From the fundamental Laplacian comparison theorem proved earlier by Eugenio Calabi, these functions are both superharmonic under the Ricci curvature assumption. Either of these functions could be negative at some points, but the triangle inequality implies that their sum is nonnegative. The strong maximum principle implies that the sum is identically zero and hence that each Busemann function is in fact (weakly) a harmonic function. Weyl's lemma implies the infinite differentiability of the Busemann functions. Then, the proof can be finished by using Bochner's formula to construct parallel vector fields, setting up the de Rham decomposition theorem. Alternatively, the theory of Riemannian submersions may be invoked.

As a consequence of their splitting theorem, Cheeger and Gromoll were able to prove that the universal cover of any closed manifold of nonnegative Ricci curvature must split isometrically as the product of a closed manifold with a Euclidean space. If the universal cover is topologically contractible, then it follows that all metrics involved must be flat.

== Lorentzian splitting theorem ==
In 1982, Shing-Tung Yau conjectured that a particular Lorentzian version of Cheeger and Gromoll's theorem should hold. Proofs in various levels of generality were found by Jost Eschenburg, Gregory Galloway, and Richard Newman. In these results, the role of geodesic completeness is replaced by either the condition of global hyperbolicity or of timelike geodesic completeness. The nonnegativity of Ricci curvature is replaced by the timelike convergence condition that the Ricci curvature is nonnegative in all timelike directions. The geodesic line is required to be timelike.
