= Intrinsic flat distance =

In mathematics, the intrinsic flat distance is a notion for distance between two Riemannian manifolds which is a generalization of Federer and Fleming's flat distance between submanifolds and integral currents lying in Euclidean space.

== Overview ==
The Sormani–Wenger intrinsic flat (SWIF) distance is a distance between compact oriented Riemannian manifolds of the same dimension. More generally it defines the distance between two integral current spaces, (X,d,T), of the same dimension (see below). This class of spaces and this distance were first announced by mathematicians Sormani and Wenger at the Geometry Festival in 2009 and the detailed development of these notions appeared in the Journal of Differential Geometry in 2011.

The SWIF distance is an intrinsic notion based upon the (extrinsic) flat distance between submanifolds and integral currents in Euclidean space developed by Federer and Fleming. The definition imitates Gromov's definition of the Gromov–Hausdorff distance in that it involves taking an infimum over all distance-preserving maps of the given spaces into all possible ambient spaces Z. Once in a common space Z, the flat distance between the images is taken by viewing the images of the spaces as integral currents in the sense of Ambrosio–Kirchheim.

The rough idea in both intrinsic and extrinsic settings is to view the spaces as the boundary of a third space or region and to find the smallest weighted volume of this third space. In this way, spheres with many splines that contain increasingly small amounts of volume converge "SWIF-ly" to spheres.

== Riemannian setting ==
Given two compact oriented Riemannian manifolds, M_{i}, possibly with boundary:

d_{SWIF}(M_{1}, M_{2}) = 0

iff there is an orientation preserving isometry from M_{1} to M_{2}. If M_{i} converge in the Gromov–Hausdorff sense to a metric space Y then a subsequence of the M_{i} converge SWIF-ly to an integral current space contained in Y but not necessarily equal to Y. For example, the GH limit of a sequence of spheres with a long thin neck pinch is a pair of spheres with a line segment running between them while the SWIF limit is just the pair of spheres. The GH limit of a sequence of thinner and thinner tori is a circle but the flat limit is the 0 space. In the setting with nonnegative Ricci curvature and a uniform lower bound on volume, the GH and SWIF limits agree. If a sequence of manifolds converge in the Lipschitz sense to a limit Lipschitz manifold then the SWIF limit exists and has the same limit.

Wenger's compactness theorem states that if a sequence of compact Riemannian manifolds, M_{j}, has a uniform upper bound on diameter, volume and boundary volume, then a subsequence converges SWIF-ly to an integral current space.

== Integral current spaces ==
An m dimensional integral current space (X,d,T) is a metric space (X,d) with an m-dimensional integral current structure T. More precisely, using notions of Ambrosio–Kirchheim, T is an m-dimensional integral current on the metric completion of X, and X is the set of positive density of the mass measure of T. As a consequence of deep theorems of Ambrosio–Kirchheim, X is then a countably H^{m} rectifiable metric space, so it is covered H^{m} almost everywhere by the images of bi-Lipschitz charts from compact subsets of R^{m}, it is endowed with an integer valued weight function and it has an orientation. In addition an integral current space has a well defined notion of boundary which is an (m − 1)-dimensional integral current space. A 0-dimensional integral current space is a finite collection of points with integer valued weights. One special integral current space found in every dimension is the 0 space.

The intrinsic flat distance between two integral current spaces is defined as follows:

d_{SWIF}((X_{1}, d_{1}, T_{1}), (X_{2}, d_{2}, T_{2},)) is defined to be the infimum of all numbers d_{F}(f_{1*} T_{1},f_{2*} T_{2}) for all metric spaces M and all distance preserving maps f_{i} :X_{i} → Z. Here d_{F} denotes flat distance between the integral currents in Z found by pushing forward the integral current structures T_{i}.

Two integral current spaces have d_{SWIF} = 0 if and only if there is a current preserving isometry between the spaces.

All the above mentioned results may be stated in this more general setting as well, including Wenger's Compactness Theorem.

== Applications ==
- To prove certain GH limits are countably H^{m} rectifiable
- To understand smooth convergence away from singularities
- To understand convergence of Riemannian manifolds with boundary
- To study questions arising in general relativity
- To study questions arising in Gromov's paper on Plateau–Stein manifolds
