= Lebrun manifold =

Connected sum of copies of the complex projective plane

In mathematics, a LeBrun manifold is a connected sum of copies of the complex projective plane, equipped with an explicit self-dual metric. Here, self-dual means that the Weyl tensor is its own Hodge star. The metric is determined by the choice of a finite collection of points in hyperbolic 3-space. These metrics were discovered by Claude LeBrun (1991), and named after LeBrun by Michael Atiyah and Edward Witten (2002).
