= Christina Tønnesen-Friedman =

Danish-American mathematician

Christina Wiis Tønnesen-Friedman is a Danish-American mathematician specializing in Riemannian geometry, especially of Kähler manifolds and Sasakian manifolds. She is Marie Louise Bailey Professor of Mathematics at Union College in Schenectady, New York.

== Education ==
Tønnesen-Friedman studied mathematics and chemistry at Odense University, earning a candidate degree in 1995 and completing her Ph.D. in mathematics in 1997. Her doctoral dissertation, Extremal Kähler Metrics on Ruled Surfaces, was co-advised by Claude LeBrun and Henrik Laurberg Pedersen.

== Career ==
Tønnesen-Friedman became a research assistant professor at Aarhus University in 1997. In 2001, she moved to Union College as an assistant professor of mathematics. She was tenured as an associate professor in 2007, promoted to full professor in 2012, and chaired the mathematics department at Union College from 2017 to 2021.
