= Cambridge & Coleridge Athletic Club =

British athletics club

- Founded: 1961
- Ground: Cambridge University Sports Ground
- Location: Wilberforce Road, Cambridge CB3 0RS, England
- Coordinates: 52°12′25″N 0°05′47″E
- Website: official website

Cambridge & Coleridge Athletic Club (commonly referred to as C&C) is an athletic club based in Cambridge, England. It competes in track and field athletics, road running and cross-country. On the track, C&C is part of the Southern Athletics League and the East Anglian League. On the roads, the participates in the Frostbite Friendly League and the Kevin Henry 5K League. C&C is also a member of the Essex cross-country League.

The club is based at the University of Cambridge's athletics track on Wilberforce Road.

== History ==
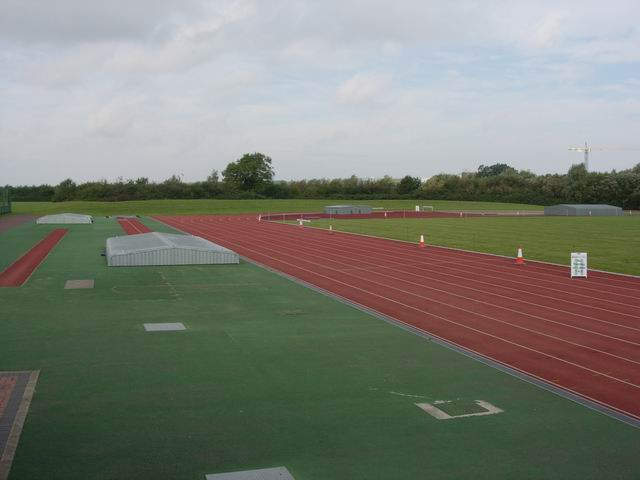
The Wilberforce Road track in 2007

The origins of the club came from two other clubs in Cambridge; the Cambridge City Athletic Club and the Coleridge Athletic Club. The two clubs merged in 1961 to form the club that exists today.

The club were based at a University owned track on Milton Road, which had been built in 1958 and was demolished in 1996. The club then followed the Cambridge University AC to its new track on Wilberforce Road.

== Notable athletes ==
- Jon Ridgeon
- Thomas Keen
- Julia Paternain
