= Bismut connection =

In mathematics, the Bismut connection $\nabla$ is the unique connection on a complex Hermitian manifold that satisfies the following conditions,

1. It preserves the metric $\nabla g =0$
2. It preserves the complex structure $\nabla J=0$
3. The torsion $T(X,Y)$ contracted with the metric, i.e. $T(X,Y,Z)=g(T(X,Y),Z)$, is totally skew-symmetric.

Bismut has used this connection when proving a local index formula for the Dolbeault operator on non-Kähler manifolds. Bismut connection has applications in type II and heterotic string theory.

The explicit construction goes as follows. Let $\langle-,-\rangle$ denote the pairing of two vectors using the metric that is Hermitian w.r.t the complex structure, i.e. $\langle X,JY\rangle=-\langle JX,Y\rangle$. Further let $\nabla$ be the Levi-Civita connection. Define first a tensor $T$ such that $T(Z,X,Y)=-\frac12\langle Z,J(\nabla_{X}J)Y\rangle$. This tensor is anti-symmetric in the first and last entry, i.e. the new connection $\nabla+T$ still preserves the metric. In concrete terms, the new connection is given by $\Gamma^{\alpha}_{\beta\gamma}-\frac12 J^{\alpha}_{~\delta}\nabla_{\beta}J^{\delta}_{~\gamma}$ with $\Gamma^{\alpha}_{\beta\gamma}$ being the Levi-Civita connection. The new connection also preserves the complex structure. However, the tensor $T$ is not yet totally anti-symmetric; the anti-symmetrization will lead to the Nijenhuis tensor. Denote the anti-symmetrization as $T(Z,X,Y)+\textrm{cyc~in~}X,Y,Z=T(Z,X,Y)+S(Z,X,Y)$, with $S$ given explicitly as

$$S(Z,X,Y)=-\frac12\langle X,J(\nabla_{Y}J)Z\rangle-\frac12\langle Y,J(\nabla_{Z}J)X\rangle.$$

$S$ still preserves the complex structure, i.e. $S(Z,X,JY)=-S(JZ,X,Y)$.

$$\begin{align}
S(Z,X,JY)+S(JZ,X,Y)&=-\frac12\langle JX, \big(-(\nabla_{JY}J)Z-(J\nabla_ZJ)Y+(J\nabla_YJ)Z+(\nabla_{JZ}J)Y\big)\rangle\\
&=-\frac12\langle JX, Re\big((1-iJ)[(1+iJ)Y,(1+iJ)Z]\big)\rangle.\end{align}$$

So if $J$ is integrable, then above term vanishes, and the connection

$$\Gamma^{\alpha}_{\beta\gamma}+T^{\alpha}_{~\beta\gamma}+S^{\alpha}_{~\beta\gamma}.$$

gives the Bismut connection.
