= John Etnyre =

American mathematician

John Boyd Etnyre is an American mathematician at the Georgia Institute of Technology, and his research fields include contact geometry, symplectic geometry and low-dimensional topology. He earned his Ph.D. in 1996 from the University of Texas, Austin under the supervision of Robert Gompf. Etnyre was a postdoctoral scholar at Stanford University from 1997 to 2001. He was a faculty member at the University of Pennsylvania prior to joining the faculty at the Georgia Institute of Technology.

In 2013, Etnyre was in the Inaugural Class of Fellows of the American Mathematical Society. He received a National Science Foundation CAREER grant award in 2003, and in 2015-2016, he was a Simons Fellow in Mathematics. Etnyre serves as a Principal Editor for the journal of Algebraic & Geometric Topology.
