= Julia Paternain =

Uruguayan long-distance runner

Personal information
- Nationality: Uruguay, United Kingdom
- Born: 29 September 1999 (age 26) León, Guanajuato, Mexico
- Education: University of Arkansas BA Psychology & MBA; Hills Road Sixth Form College, Cambridge, United Kingdom
- Parent: Gabriel Paternain (father)

Sport
- Sport: Athletics
- Event: Long distance running

Achievements and titles
- Personal bests: Marathon 2:25:47 (2026) NR
Medal record
Women's athletics
Representing Uruguay
World Championships
Bronze medal – third place	2025 Tokyo	Marathon

Julia Paternain (born 29 September 1999) is a long-distance runner who represents Uruguay internationally. She was a bronze medalist in the marathon at the 2025 World Athletics Championships and holds the Uruguayan national record in the distance.

== Early life ==
Paternain was born in Mexico to Uruguayan mathematicians Gabriel Paternain and Graciela Muniz. At two years old she moved to England. She competed as a member of Cambridge & Coleridge Athletic Club in England. She won the English Schools title over 3,000 metres in Gateshead in 2017, taking nine seconds off her personal best to win in 9:30.74, and retained the title again in 2018. She represented Great Britain at the 2019 European Athletics U23 Championships, placing sixth in the 10,000 metres race.

== NCAA ==
Paternain moved to the United States in 2018 to attend Penn State University for two years before transferring to University of Arkansas for three years. She earned 2019 NCAA Division I Mid-Atlantic Region Cross Country honors after placing ninth. Paternain earned 2023 All-SEC Outdoor Track and Field honors after placing second in the 10,000 meters.

representing Arkansas Razorbacks
2023	NCAA Division I Outdoor Track and Field Championships	5000 m	16:15.08	46th
2023	Southeastern Conference Outdoor Track and Field Championships	10,000 m	35:07.76	2nd place, silver medalist(s)
2023	Southeastern Conference Outdoor Track and Field Championships	5000 m	16:25.80	8th
2022	Southeastern Conference Cross Country Championships	6 km	21:16.5	57th
2021	2021 NCAA Division I cross country championships	6 km	20:56.2	171st
2021	Southeastern Conference cross country championships	6 km	21:17.5	28th
2020	Redshirt			
representing Penn State Nittany Lions track and field
2019	2019 NCAA Division I cross country championships	6 km	21:38.5	151st
2019	Big Ten Conference cross country championships	6 km	21:19.2	44th
2019	2019 NCAA Division I Outdoor Track and Field Championships	5000 m	17:13.82	22nd
2019	2019 NCAA Division I Outdoor Track and Field Championships	10,000 m	33:55.53	25th
2019	Big Ten Conference Outdoor Track and Field Championships	10,000 m	33:22.91	6th
2018	2018 NCAA Division I cross country championships	6 km	21:17.4	125th
2018	Big Ten Conference cross country championships	6 km	20:22.9	10th

== Professional ==
Paternain switched her international athletics eligibility from Great Britain to Uruguay in January 2025.

Paternain worked at the West Coast Conference for one year while she healed from her college injuries. She later moved to Flagstaff, Arizona and was then a project manager at Ohio University, working remotely. Paternain met her training partner, Danielle Shanahan Polerecky, and her future coach, Jack Polerecky in Flagstaff.

She turned her attention to road races and began training with the McKirdy Training Group. At the Twin Cities 10 Mile from Minneapolis to St. Paul, Paternain finished fifth in 53:26.

In November 2024, she edged Sara Hall by ten seconds to take second at the Indianapolis Half Marathon, running 1:10:15 behind Emma Grace Hurley. In March 2025, she ran a Uruguayan national record in the marathon on her marathon debut, running 2:27:09 in Rockland Lake State Park, New York.

In 2025, Paternain signed a multi-year endorsement contract with Saucony.

=== 2025 World Athletics Championship ===
Paternain was a bronze medalist representing Uruguay in the marathon at the 2025 World Athletics Championships in Tokyo, Japan in 2:27:23. It was the first medal won by Uruguay at the Championships.

Paternain entered the race ranked 288th in the world and was not expected to place for a medal.

Paternain ran a new personal best and national record of 2:25:47 at the 2026 London Marathon, finishing eighth.

representing Saucony & Uruguay
2025	McKirdy Micro - The Road to Tokyo	Congers, New York; Rockland Lake State Park	Marathon	2:27:09	1st place, gold medalist(s)
2025	World Athletics Championships	Tokyo	Marathon	2:27:23	3rd place, bronze medalist(s)
2026	London Marathon	London	Marathon	2:25:47 NR	8th
