= Kathryn Hess =

American mathematician

Kathryn Hess Bellwald
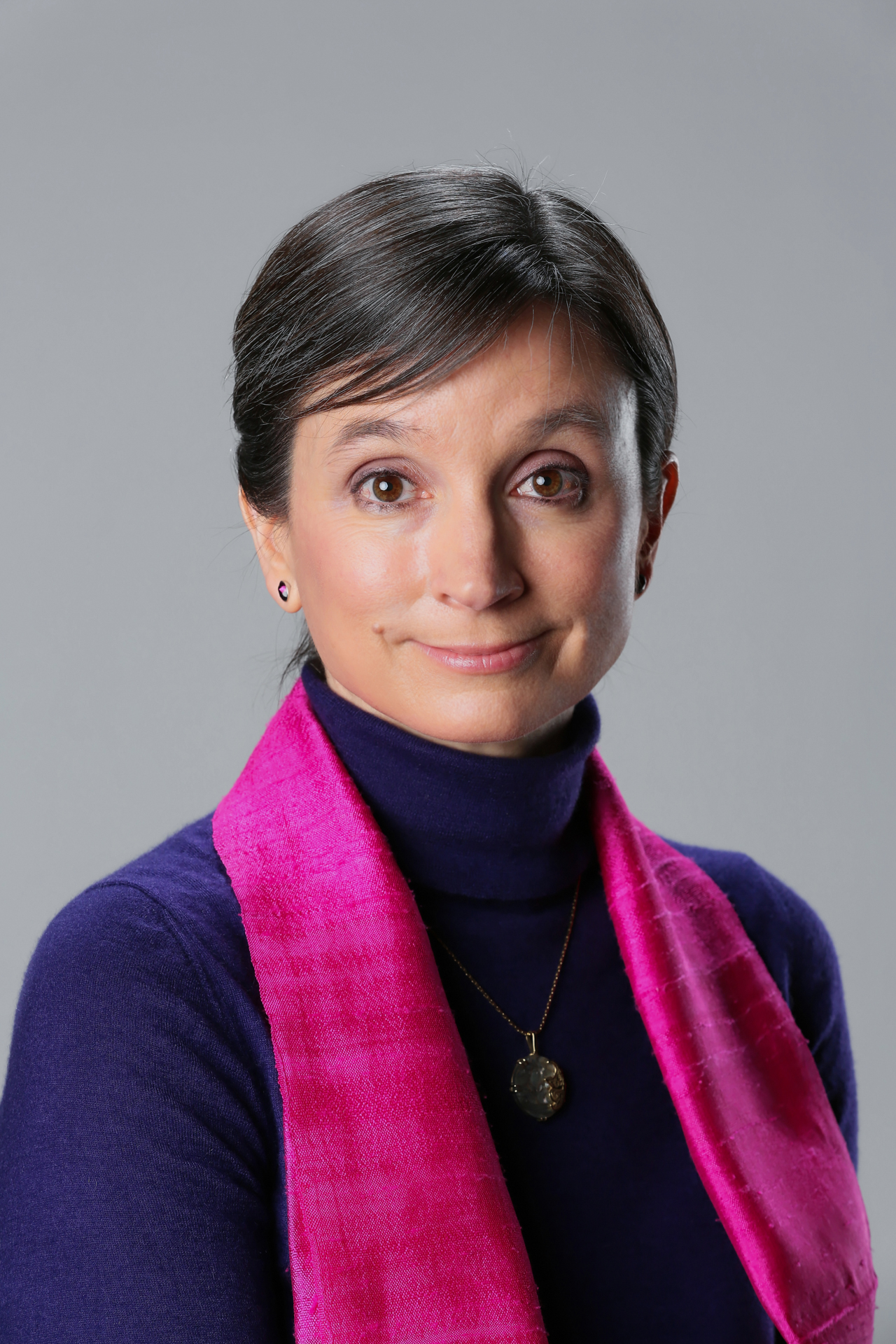
- Kathryn Hess Bellwald in 2019
- Born: 21 September 1967 (age 58); Bryn Mawr, Pennsylvania, US
- Education: University of Wisconsin–Madison; Massachusetts Institute of Technology
- Awards: Fellow of the American Mathematical Society (2017); Fellow of the Association for Women in Mathematics (2024)
- Scientific career
- Fields: Mathematics
- Workplaces: École Polytechnique Fédérale de Lausanne (EPFL)
- Doctoral advisor: David Jay Anick

Kathryn Pamela Hess (born 1967) is an American mathematician who has served as professor of mathematics at École Polytechnique Fédérale de Lausanne (EPFL) since 1999. She is known for her work on homotopy theory, category theory, and algebraic topology, both pure and applied. In particular, she applies the methods of algebraic topology to the study of neuroscience, cancer biology, and materials science. She is a fellow of the American Mathematical Society.

== Life ==
Kathryn Hess was born 21 September 1967 in Bryn Mawr, Pennsylvania. She began to accelerate in mathematics in 1979, thanks to the Mathematical Talent Development Project (MTDP) set up in Eau Claire, Wisconsin, by her parents, through the Association for High Potential Children, which they also founded. Both programs are currently defunct. Hess earned a BSc with honors in mathematics from the University of Wisconsin–Madison in 1985. She received her doctorate in mathematics from the Massachusetts Institute of Technology in 1989 under the direction of David J. Anick. Her dissertation was entitled A Proof of Ganea's Conjecture for Rational Spaces.^{[H91]}

== Work ==
Hess has worked and written extensively on topics in algebraic topology including homotopy theory, model categories^{[H02]} and algebraic K-theory.^{[HS]} She has also used the methods of algebraic topology and category theory to investigate homotopical generalizations of descent theory^{[H10]} and Hopf–Galois extensions.^{[H09]} In particular, she has studied generalizations of these structures for ring spectra and differential graded algebras.

She has more recently used algebraic topology to understand structures in neurology^{[KDS]}^{[DHL]} and materials science.^{[LBD]}

As of March 2025, she has been the principal academic advisor for 21 mathematics PhDs at EPFL, including 9 women.

== Awards and honors ==
In addition to her strong publication record, Hess has been widely recognized for her pedagogical abilities. She received the Agepoly prize for best teacher in the Basic Sciences Faculty in 2005, the Credit Suisse prize for best EPFL teacher in 2012, and the "Polysphere d'Or" Agepoly prize for best teacher at EPFL in 2013.

She was named an individual member of the Swiss Academy of Engineering Sciences in 2016 and a fellow of the American Mathematical Society for "contributions to homotopy theory, applications of topology to the analysis of biological data, and service to the mathematical community" in 2017. In 2017, she received an award as a distinguished speaker of the European Mathematical Society. She delivered one of the public lectures during the Eighth European Congress of Mathematics on 21 June 2021. Hess was named a fellow of the Association for Women in Mathematics in the class of 2024 "for her support of women in mathematics via innovative and impactful programs, including her role in founding and sustaining the Women in Topology program; for her exceptional mentoring; and for her commitment to gender diversity throughout her many leadership roles in the mathematics profession." She was a visiting member of the IBS Center for Geometry and Physics.

== Selected publications ==
| H91. | Hess, Kathryn P. (1991). "A proof of Ganea's conjecture for rational spaces". Topology. 30 (2): 205–214. doi:10.1016/0040-9383(91)90006-p. MR 1098914. |

| H02. | Hess, Kathryn (2002). "Model categories in algebraic topology". Applied Categorical Structures. 10 (3): 195–220. doi:10.1023/A:1015218106586. MR 1916154. S2CID 31214400. |

| H09. | Hess, Kathryn (2009). "Homotopic Hopf–Galois extensions: Foundations and examples" (PDF). New topological contexts for Galois theory and algebraic geometry (BIRS 2008). Geom. Topol. Monogr. Vol. 16. pp. 79–132. arXiv:0902.3393. doi:10.2140/gtm.2009.16.79. MR 2544387. S2CID 14630594. |

| H10. | Hess, Kathryn (2010). "A general framework for homotopic descent and codescent". arXiv:1001.1556 [math.AT]. |

| DHL. | Dotko, Pawe; Hess, Kathryn; Levi, Ran; Nolte, Max; Reimann, Michael; Scolamiero, Martina; Turner, Katharine; Muller, Eilif; Markram, Henry (2016). "Topological analysis of the connectome of digital reconstructions of neural microcircuits". Frontiers in Computational Neuroscience. 11: 48. arXiv:1601.01580. Bibcode:2016arXiv160101580D. doi:10.3389/fncom.2017.00048. PMC 5467434. PMID 28659782. |

| HS. | Hess, Kathryn; Shipley, Brooke (2016). "Waldhausen K-theory of spaces via comodules". Advances in Mathematics. 290: 1079–1137. arXiv:1402.4719. doi:10.1016/j.aim.2015.12.019. MR 3451948. S2CID 15050389. |

| KDS. | Kanari, Lida; Dłotko, Paweł; Scolamiero, Martina; Levi, Ran; Shillcock, Julian; Hess, Kathryn; Markram, Henry (2016). "Quantifying topological invariants of neuronal morphologies". arXiv:1603.08432 [q-bio.NC]. |

| LBD. | Lee, Yongjin; Barthel, Senja D.; Dłotko, Paweł; Moosavi, S. Mohamad; Hess, Kathryn; Smit, Berend (2017). "Quantifying similarity of pore-geometry in nanoporous materials". Nature Communications. 8 15396. arXiv:1701.06953. Bibcode:2017NatCo...815396L. doi:10.1038/ncomms15396. PMC 5457500. PMID 28534490. |
