= Guoliang Yu =

Chinese American mathematician

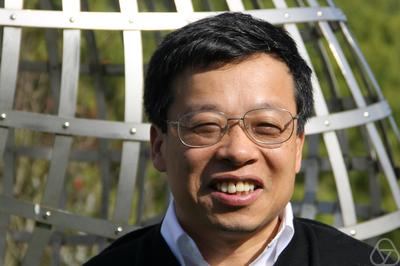
- Education: Stony Brook University
- Scientific career
- Fields: Mathematics
- Workplaces: University of Colorado Boulder; Mathematical Sciences Research Institute; Vanderbilt University; Texas A&M University

Guoliang Yu is a Chinese American mathematician. After receiving his Ph.D. from SUNY at Stony Brook in 1991 under the direction of Ronald G. Douglas, Yu spent time at the Mathematical Sciences Research Institute (1991–1992), the University of Colorado at Boulder (1992–2000), Vanderbilt University (2000–2012), and a variety of visiting positions. He currently holds the Powell Chair in Mathematics and was appointed University Distinguished Professor in 2018 at Texas A&M University. He is a fellow of the American Mathematical Society. He is also a Simons Fellow in Mathematics. He was awarded the Gauss Professorship by the Goettingen Academy of Sciences in 2023. In 2026, he is elected Vice President of American Mathematical Society.

Yu's research interests include noncommutative geometry, higher index theory of elliptic operators, K-theory, and geometric group theory. He is best known for his fundamental contributions to the Novikov conjecture on homotopy invariance of higher signatures, the Baum–Connes conjecture on K-theory of group C*-algebras, and the stable Borel conjecture on rigidity of manifolds. In his work on the Novikov conjecture, he developed controlled operator K-theory. In the mathematical literature, several concepts are named after him, including Yu's property A and Yu's localization algebra.

Yu has delivered invited addresses at the American Mathematical Society meeting in 1999, and at the International Congress of Mathematicians in Madrid in 2006. He was a plenary speaker at the Topology Festival in 2002 and the Geometry Festival in 2007. In 2022, he was invited to deliver the NSF-CBMS lecture series. He is an editor of the Journal of Noncommutative Geometry, the Annals of K-Theory, the Journal of Topology and Analysis, and the Kyoto Journal of Mathematics.

== Books ==
- Large Scale Geometry (with Piotr Nowak), EMS Textbooks in Mathematics. European Mathematical Society (EMS), Zürich, 2012. xiv+189 pp. ISBN 978-3-03719-112-5.
- Higher Index Theory (with Rufus Willett), Cambridge University Press. 2020. xi+582 pp. ISBN 978-1-108-49106-8.
- The Universal Coefficient Theorem for C*-Algebras with Finite Complexity (with Rufus Willett), Memoirs of the European Mathematical Society, European Mathematical Society Publishing House, 2024. viii+100pp, ISBN 978-3-98547-066-2.
- Dynamical Complexity and Controlled Operator K-theory (with Erik Guentner and Rufus Willett). Astérisque, No. 451, Société Mathématique de France, 2024. 89 pp. ISBN 978-2-37905-202-6.
