= Claude LeBrun =

American mathematician

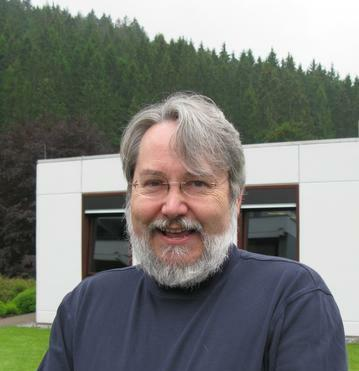
- LeBrun in 2012
- Citizenship: United States
- Education: Rice University; University of Oxford
- Known for: LeBrun manifolds LeBrun-Salamon Conjecture
- Scientific career
- Fields: Mathematics
- Workplaces: Stony Brook University
- Doctoral advisor: Roger Penrose
- Doctoral students: Christina Tønnesen-Friedman

Claude R. LeBrun (born 1956) is an American mathematician who holds the position of Distinguished Professor of Mathematics at Stony Brook University. Much of his research concerns the Riemannian geometry of 4-manifolds, or related topics in complex and differential geometry.

After enrolling as an undergraduate at Rice University at age 16, LeBrun received his Master of Arts in mathematics from Rice in 1977. He then went on to earn his D.Phil. (Oxford equivalent of a Ph.D.) from the University of Oxford in 1980, at the age of 23, for a thesis on complex differential geometry written under the supervision of Roger Penrose. That same year, he then accepted his first faculty position at Stony Brook. Although he would eventually go on to spend most of his career at Stony Brook, he has also held positions at a number of other institutions, including the Institut des Hautes Études Scientifiques, the Mathematical Sciences Research Institute, and the Institute for Advanced Study.

He is the namesake of the LeBrun manifolds, a family of self-dual manifolds that he discovered in 1989 and that was named after him by Michael Atiyah and Edward Witten. LeBrun is also known for his work on Einstein manifolds and the Yamabe invariant. In particular, he produced examples showing that the converse of the Hitchin–Thorpe inequality does not hold: there exist infinitely many four-dimensional compact smooth simply connected manifolds that obey the inequality but do not admit Einstein metrics.

LeBrun was an invited speaker at the 1994 International Congress of Mathematicians. In 2012, he became a Fellow of the American Mathematical Society. In 2016, a conference in his honor was held at the Centre de Recherches Mathématiques in Montreal. In 2018, he became a Simons Foundation Fellow in Mathematics. In 2020, he was appointed as Distinguished Professor at the State University of New York. In 2025, he became a Simons Foundation Fellow in Mathematics for the second time, while also becoming a laureate of the Chaires d'Excellence program of the Fondation Sciences Mathématiques de Paris. In 2026, a conference in his honor was held at the International Center for Theoretical Physics in Trieste, Italy.
