= Christina Sormani =

American mathematician

- Citizenship: United States
- Education: New York University
- Known for: Riemannian geometry
- Awards: Fellow of the American Mathematical Society; Fellow of the Association for Women in Mathematics
- Scientific career
- Fields: Mathematics
- Workplaces: Lehman College; CUNY Graduate Center
- Thesis: Noncompact Manifolds with Lower Ricci Curvature Bounds and Minimal Volume Growth (1996)
- Doctoral advisor: Jeff Cheeger

Christina Sormani is a professor of mathematics at City University of New York affiliated with Lehman College and the CUNY Graduate Center. She is known for her research in Riemannian geometry, metric geometry, and Ricci curvature, as well as her work on the notion of intrinsic flat distance.

== Career ==
Sormani received her Ph.D. from New York University in 1996 under Jeff Cheeger. She then took postdoctoral positions at Harvard University (under Shing-Tung Yau) and Johns Hopkins University (under William Minicozzi II). Sormani is now a Full Professor of Mathematics at Lehman College in the City University of New York and member of the doctoral faculty at the CUNY Graduate Center.

== Awards and honors ==
In 2009, Sormani was an invited speaker at the Geometry Festival. She received the Association for Women in Mathematics (AWM) Service Award in 2015. She was recognized for her work planning and coordinating Association for Women in Mathematics activities at the Joint Mathematics Meetings.

In 2015, Sormani became a Fellow of the American Mathematical Society. She was honored for her research in geometry, specifically Ricci curvature. Her mentorship of junior mathematicians from underrepresented groups was also cited in the recognition.

Sormani was selected as an Association for Women in Mathematics Fellow in the Class of 2024 "for utilizing every opportunity to open pathways to mathematics for more women and students by creating and maintaining online access to advice, mathematical resources, and information about women mathematicians; for organizing the “Inspiring Talks by Mathematicians” lecture series featuring under-represented speakers, and for her dedicated and active contributions to the AWM."

== Selected publications ==
- Sormani, Christina. (2000). Nonnegative Ricci curvature, small linear diameter growth and finite generation of fundamental groups. Journal of Differential Geometry, 54(3), pages 547–559. MR 1823314.
- Sormani, Christina, & Wei, Guofang. Hausdorff convergence and universal covers. Transactions of the American Mathematical Society, 353 (2001), no. 9, pages 3585–3602. MR 1837249
- Sormani, Christinam & Wei, Guofang. Universal covers for Hausdorff limits of noncompact spaces. Transactions of the American Mathematical Society, 356 (2004), no. 3, pages 1233–1270. MR 2021619
- Sormani, Christina, & Wenger, Stefan. (2010). Weak convergence of currents and cancellation. Calculus of Variations and Partial Differential Equations, 38, 183–206. https://doi.org/10.1007/s00526-009-0282-x
- Lee, Dan A, & Sormani, Christina. (2014). Stability of the positive mass theorem for rotationally symmetric Riemannian manifolds. Journal für die reine und angewandte Mathematik (Crelles Journal) 686. https://doi.org/10.1515/crelle-2012-0094
- Sormani, Christina, & Wenger, Stefan. (2011). The intrinsic flat distance between Riemannian manifolds and other integral current spaces." Journal of Differential Geometry, 87(1), pages 117–199. MR 2786592
