= Analysis Situs (paper) =

1895 mathematics paper by Henri Poincaré

"Analysis Situs" is a seminal mathematics paper that Henri Poincaré published in 1895. Poincaré published five supplements to the paper between 1899 and 1904.

These papers provided the first systematic treatment of topology and revolutionized the subject by using algebraic structures to distinguish between non-homeomorphic topological spaces, founding the field of algebraic topology. Poincaré's papers introduced the concepts of the fundamental group and simplicial homology, provided an early formulation of the Poincaré duality theorem, introduced the Euler–Poincaré characteristic for chain complexes, and raised several important conjectures, including the celebrated Poincaré conjecture, which was later proven as a theorem. The 1895 paper coined the mathematical term "homeomorphism".
