= Detlef Gromoll =

German mathematician (1938–2008)

- Born: 13 May 1938; Berlin, Germany
- Died: 31 May 2008 (aged 70); Stony Brook, New York, US
- Education: University of Bonn
- Known for: Soul theorem, Splitting theorem
- Scientific career
- Fields: Mathematics
- Workplaces: SUNY Stony Brook
- Doctoral advisor: Friedrich Hirzebruch
- Doctoral students: Gabriel Paternain; Guofang Wei

Detlef Gromoll (13 May 1938 – 31 May 2008) was a mathematician who worked in differential geometry.

== Biography ==
Gromoll was born in Berlin in 1938, and was a classically trained violinist. After living and attending school in Rosdorf and graduating from high school in Bonn, he obtained his Ph.D. in mathematics at the University of Bonn in 1964. Following sojourns at several universities, he joined the State University of New York at Stony Brook in 1969.

He married Suzan L. Lemay on 29 December 1971, and they had three children together: Hans Christian (also a mathematician), Heidi, and Stefan, a physicist and cofounder of Scientific Media. He died in 2008 at age 70.

== See also ==
- Abresch–Gromoll inequality
- Gromoll–Meyer sphere
- Rational homotopy theory
- Splitting theorem
- Soul theorem

== Publications ==
- Gromoll, Detlef; Klingenberg, Wilhelm; Meyer, Wolfgang (1968). Riemannsche Geometrie im Grossen. Lecture Notes in Mathematics. Vol. 55. Berlin-New York: Springer Verlag. MR 0229177.
- Cheeger, Jeff; Gromoll, Detlef (1972). "On the structure of complete manifolds of nonnegative curvature". Annals of Mathematics. Second Series. 96 (3): 413–443. doi:10.2307/1970819. JSTOR 1970819. MR 0309010.
