= Gordana Matic =

Croatian American mathematician

Gordana Matic is a Croatian-American mathematician who works as a professor at the University of Georgia. Her research concerns low-dimensional topology and contact geometry.

Matic earned her doctorate from the University of Utah in 1986, under the supervision of Ronald J. Stern, and worked as a C.L.E. Moore instructor at the Massachusetts Institute of Technology before joining the University of Georgia faculty.

Matic was the Spring 2012 speaker in the University of Texas Distinguished Women in Mathematics Lecture Series. In 2014, she was elected as a fellow of the American Mathematical Society "for contributions to low-dimensional and contact topology."
