= Analysis Situs (book) =

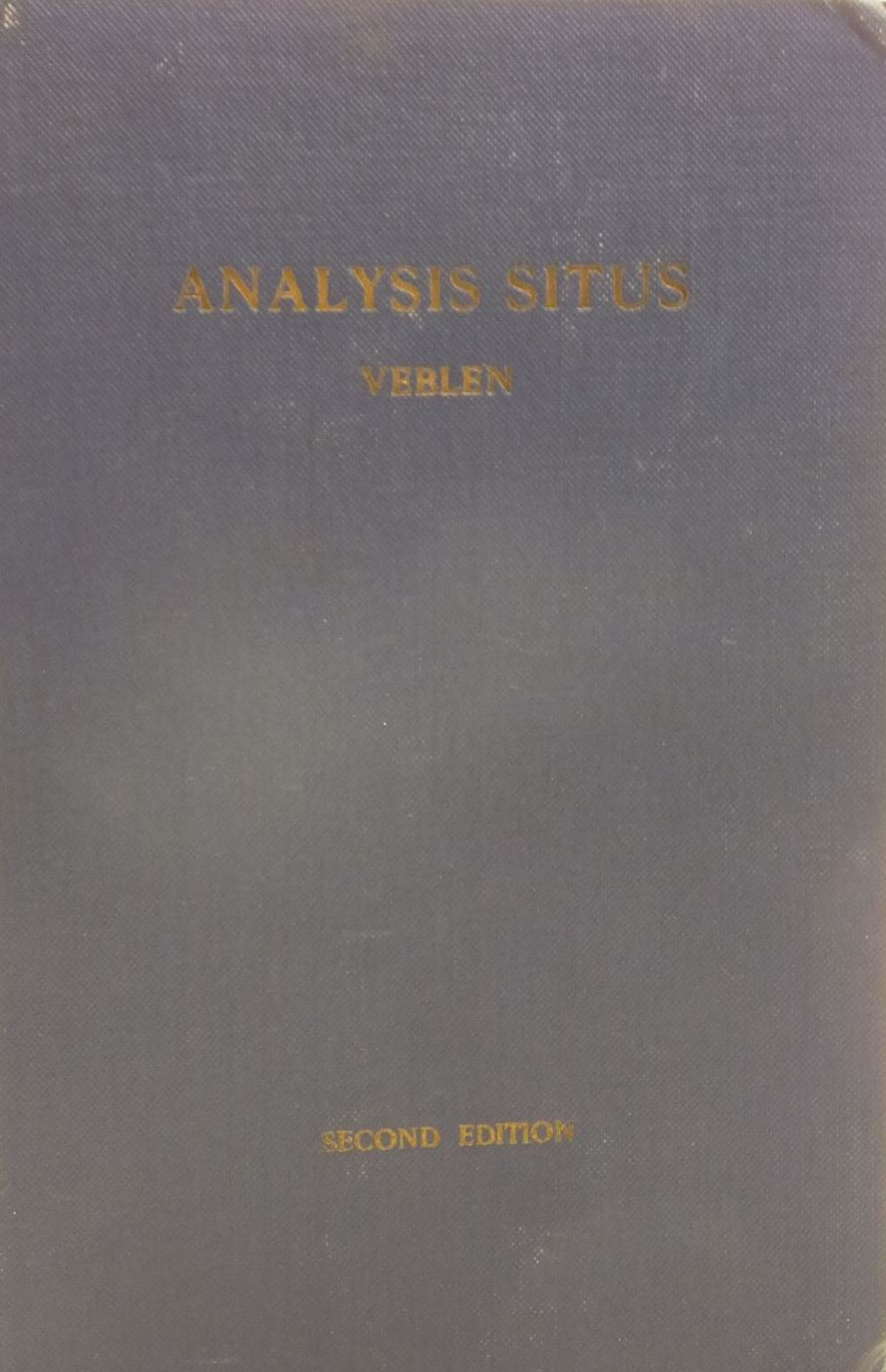
- Author: Oswald Veblen
- Genre: Mathematics
- Publisher: American Mathematical Society
- Publication date: 1922

Analysis Situs is a book by the Princeton mathematician Oswald Veblen, published in 1922. It is based on his 1916 lectures at the Cambridge Colloquium of the American Mathematical Society. The book, which went into a second edition in 1931, was the first English-language textbook on topology, and served for many years as the standard reference for the domain. Its contents were based on the work of Henri Poincaré as well as Veblen's own work with his former student and colleague, James Alexander.

Among the many innovations in the book was the first definition of a topological manifold, and systematisations of Betti number, torsion, the fundamental group, and the topological classification problem.

== Bibliography ==
- Veblen, Oswald (1922) [1916]. Analysis Situs. American Mathematical Society Colloquium Lectures. Vol. 5. New York: American Mathematical Society.
- Batterson, Steve (2007). "The Vision, Insight, and Influence of Oswald Veblen" (PDF). Notices of the American Mathematical Society. 54: 606–618.
- Hodge, W. V. D. (1961). "Oswald Veblen". Journal of the London Mathematical Society. 36: 507–512. doi:10.1112/jlms/s1-36.1.507.
- Scholz, Erhard (1999). "The Concept of Manifold, 1850–1950". In Ioan James (ed.). History of Topology. Amsterdam: Elsevier Science. pp. 25–64.
