= Jeff Cheeger =

American mathematician

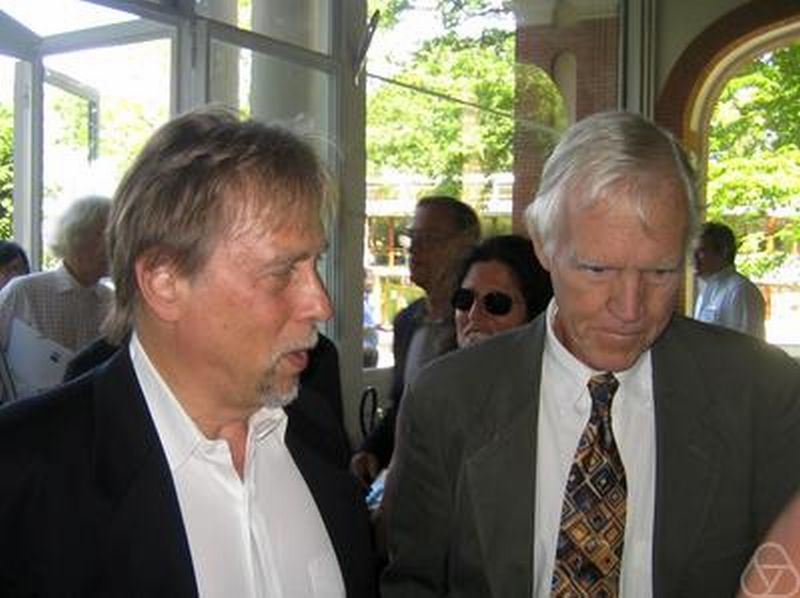
- Jeff Cheeger (left) with H. Blaine Lawson (right) in 2007
- Born: December 1, 1943 (age 82); Brooklyn, U.S.
- Education: Harvard University (BA); Princeton University (MS, PhD)
- Known for: Riemannian geometry Metric geometry Cheeger constant
- Awards: Guggenheim Fellowship (1984); NAS member (1997); Veblen Prize (2001); Steele Prize for Lifetime Achievement (2019); Shaw Prize (2021)
- Scientific career
- Fields: Mathematician
- Workplaces: New York University; Stony Brook University; University of Michigan
- Doctoral advisor: Salomon Bochner; James Harris Simons
- Doctoral students: Christina Sormani

Jeff Cheeger (born December 1, 1943) is an American mathematician and Silver Professor at the Courant Institute of Mathematical Sciences of New York University. His main interest is differential geometry and its connections with topology and analysis.

== Biography ==
Cheeger graduated from Harvard University with a B.A. in 1964. He graduated from Princeton University with an M.S. in 1966 and with a PhD in 1967. He is a Silver Professor at the Courant Institute at New York University, where he has worked since 1993.

He worked as a teaching assistant and research assistant at Princeton University from 1966 to 1967, a National Science Foundation postdoctoral fellow and instructor from 1967 to 1968, an assistant professor from 1968 to 1969 at the University of Michigan, and an associate professor from 1969 to 1971 at SUNY at Stony Brook. Cheeger was a professor at SUNY, Stony Brook from 1971 to 1985, a leading professor from 1985 to 1990, and a distinguished professor from 1990 to 1992.

Cheeger has also had a number of visiting positions in Brazil (1971), at the Institute for Advanced Study (1972, 1977, 1978, 1995), Harvard University (1972), the Institut des Hautes Études Scientifiques (1984–1985), and the Mathematical Sciences Research Institute (1985).

He has supervised at least 13 doctoral theses and three postdoctoral fellows. He has served as a member of several American Mathematical Society committees and National Science Foundation panels.

Cheeger delivered invited addresses at the International Congress of Mathematicians in 1974 and 1986.

He received the Guggenheim Fellowship in 1984. In 1998 Cheeger was elected a foreign member of the Finnish Academy of Science and Letters.

Cheeger was elected a member of the United States National Academy of Sciences in 1997. His election citation read:

Cheeger has discovered many of the deepest results in Riemannian geometry, such as estimates for the spectrum of the Laplace-Beltrami operator, and the identity of the analytic and geometric definitions of torsion, and has led to the solution of problems in topology, graph theory, number theory, and Markov processes.

He received the fourteenth Oswald Veblen Prize in Geometry from the American Mathematical Society in 2001.

== Honors and awards ==
- 1967-1968 National Science Foundation Postdoctoral Fellow
- 1971–1973 Sloan Fellowship
- 1974 Invited Speaker on the International Congress of Mathematicians
- 1978 Invited Address, Annual Meeting of AMS
- 1984–1985 Guggenheim fellowship
- 1986 Invited Speaker on the International Congress of Mathematicians
- 1992–1994 Max Planck Research Award, Alexander von Humboldt Society
- 1997 Member of the United States National Academy of Sciences
- 2001 Oswald Veblen Prize in Geometry
- 2012 Fellow of the American Mathematical Society
- 2019 Steele Prize for Lifetime Achievement
- 2021 Shaw Prize (jointly with Jean-Michel Bismut)

== Selected publications ==
- Cheeger, Jeff; Kleiner, Bruce. On the differentiability of Lipschitz maps from metric measure spaces to Banach spaces. Inspired by S. S. Chern, 129–152, Nankai Tracts kn Mathematics. 11, World Science Publications, Hackensack, N.J., 2006.
- Differentiability of Lipschitz functions on metric measure spaces. Geometric and Functional Analysis. 9 (1999), no. 3, 428–517.
- Lower bounds on Ricci curvature and the almost rigidity of warped products, with T. H. Colding. Annals of Mathematics. 144. 1996. 189–237.
- On the cone structure at infinity of Ricci flat manifolds with Euclidean volume growth and quadratic curvature decay, with Gang Tian. Inventiones Mathematicae. 118. 1994. 493–571.
- Collapsing Riemannian manifolds while keeping their curvature bounded, II, with Mikhail Gromov. Journal of Differential Geometry. 31, 4. 1990. 269–298.
- Eta-invariants and their adiabatic limits, with J. M. Bismut. Journal of American Mathematical Society, 2, 1. 1989. 33–70.
- Cheeger, Jeff; Gromov, Mikhail; Taylor, Michael Finite propagation speed, kernel estimates for functions of the Laplace operator, and the geometry of complete Riemannian manifolds. Journal of Differential Geometry. 17 (1982), no. 1, 15–53.
- On the Hodge theory of Riemannian pseudomanifolds. American Mathematical Society: Proceedings of the Symposium in Pure Mathematics. 36. 1980. 91–146.
- Cheeger, Jeff (1977), "Analytic Torsion and Reidemeister Torsion", Proceedings of the National Academy of Sciences, 74 (7): 2651–2654, Bibcode:1977PNAS...74.2651C, doi:10.1073/pnas.74.7.2651, MR 0451312, PMC 431228, PMID 16592411
- Cheeger, Jeff; Gromoll, Detlef. The splitting theorem for manifolds of nonnegative Ricci curvature. Journal of Differential Geometry. 6 (1971/72), 119–128.
- A lower bound for the smallest eigenvalue of the Laplacian. Problems in analysis (papers dedicated to Salomon Bochner, 1969), pp. 195–199. Princeton University Press, Princeton, N.J., 1970.
- Cheeger, Jeff; Gromoll, Detlef. The structure of complete manifolds of nonnegative curvature. Bulletin of the American Mathematical Society. 74 1968 1147–1150.
- Cheeger, Jeff. Finiteness theorems for Riemannian manifolds. American Journal of Mathematics. 92 (1970) 61–74.
- Cheeger, Jeff; Ebin, David G. Comparison theorems in Riemannian geometry. Revised reprint of the 1975 original. AMS Chelsea Publishing, Providence, RI, 2008.

== See also ==
- Cheeger bound
- Cheeger constant
- Cheeger constant (graph theory)
- Cheeger–Müller theorem
- Collapsing manifold
- L² cohomology
- Riemannian geometry
- Soul theorem
- Splitting theorem
