= Bruce Kleiner =

American mathematician

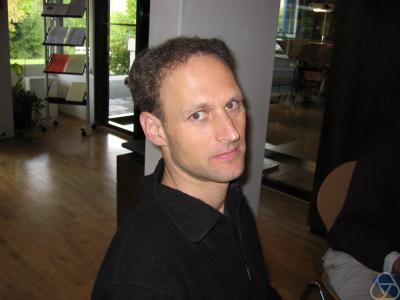
- Bruce Kleiner in Oberwolfach, 2004
- Education: University of California, Berkeley
- Awards: NAS Award for Scientific Reviewing (2013); Simons Fellow in Mathematics (2014)
- Scientific career
- Fields: Mathematics
- Workplaces: New York University
- Doctoral advisor: Wu-Yi Hsiang

Bruce Alan Kleiner is an American mathematician, working in differential geometry and topology and geometric group theory.

He received his Ph.D. in 1990 from the University of California, Berkeley. His advisor was Wu-Yi Hsiang. Kleiner is a professor of mathematics at New York University.

Kleiner has written expository papers on the Ricci flow. Together with John Lott of the University of Michigan, he filled in details of Grigori Perelman's proof of the Geometrization conjecture (from which the Poincaré conjecture follows) in the years 2003–2006. Theirs was the first publication acknowledging Perelman's accomplishment (in May, 2006), which was shortly followed by similar papers by Huai-Dong Cao and Xi-Ping Zhu (in June) and John Morgan and Gang Tian (in July).

Kleiner found a relatively simple proof of Gromov's theorem on groups of polynomial growth. He also proved the Cartan–Hadamard conjecture in dimension 3.
