= Gabriel Paternain =

Uruguayan mathematician

- Education: SUNY Stony Brook
- Scientific career
- Fields: Mathematics
- Workplaces: University of Cambridge University of Washington
- Thesis: Geometric and Toplogical Prop of Manifolds - Completely Integrable Geodesic Flows (1991)
- Doctoral advisor: Detlef Gromoll

Gabriel Pedro Paternain is a Uruguayan mathematician. He is Professor of Mathematics at the University of Washington, and a fellow of Trinity College, Cambridge. Previously he was a professor in DPMMS at the University of Cambridge. He obtained his Licenciatura from Universidad de la Republica in Uruguay in 1987, and his PhD from the State University of New York at Stony Brook in 1991. He has lectured several undergraduate and graduate courses and has gained widespread popularity due to his entertaining and informal lecturing style, which has been recognised by the university in the past for its high calibre. He was managing editor of the mathematical journal Mathematical Proceedings of the Cambridge Philosophical Society for the period 2006–2011.

He is known for his work on dynamical and geometrical aspects of Hamiltonian systems, in particular magnetic and geodesic flows. His recent research focuses on geometric inverse problems and his collaboration with Mikko Salo and Gunther Uhlmann yielded solutions to several inverse problems in two dimensions, including the tensor tomography problem and the proof of spectral rigidity of an Anosov surface.

In his spare time, he partakes in a wide variety of sports, notably football. He is the father of 2025 World Athletics Championships women's marathon bronze medallist Julia Paternain.
