= Tobias Colding =

Danish mathematician

- Born: 1963 (age 62–63); Copenhagen, Denmark
- Education: University of Pennsylvania
- Awards: Veblen Prize in Geometry (2010); Rolf Schock Prize in Mathematics (2026)
- Scientific career
- Fields: Mathematics
- Workplaces: Massachusetts Institute of Technology; New York University
- Doctoral advisor: Christopher Croke

Tobias Holck Colding (born 1963) is a Danish mathematician working on geometric analysis, and low-dimensional topology. He is the great-grandchild of Ludwig August Colding.

== Biography ==
He was born in Copenhagen, Denmark, to Torben Holck Colding and Benedicte Holck Colding. He received his Ph.D. in mathematics in 1992 at the University of Pennsylvania under Chris Croke. Since 2005 Colding has been a professor of mathematics at MIT. He was on the faculty at the Courant Institute of New York University in various positions from 1992 to 2008. He has also been a visiting professor at MIT (2000–01) and at Princeton University (2001–02) and a postdoctoral fellow at MSRI (1993–94). Colding lives in Cambridge, Massachusetts, with his wife and three children.

== Work ==
In the early stage of his career, Colding did impressive work on manifolds with bounds on Ricci curvature. In 1995 he presented this work at the Geometry Festival. He began working with Jeff Cheeger while at NYU. He gave a 45-minute invited address to the ICM on this work in 1998 in Berlin. He began coauthoring with William P. Minicozzi at this time: first on harmonic functions, later on minimal surfaces, and now on mean curvature flow.

== Recognition ==
He gave an AMS Lecture at University of Tennessee. He also gave an invited address at the first AMS-Scandinavian International meeting in Odense, Denmark, in 2000 and an invited address at the Germany Mathematics Meeting in 2003 in Rostock. He gave the 2008 Mordell Lecture at the University of Cambridge and gave the 2010 Cantrell Lectures at University of Georgia. Since 2008 he has been a Fellow of the American Academy of Arts and Sciences, and since 2006 a foreign member of the Royal Danish Academy of Sciences and Letters, and also since 2006 an honorary professor of University of Copenhagen, Denmark.

In 2010 Tobias H. Colding received the Oswald Veblen Prize in Geometry together with William Minicozzi II for their work on minimal surfaces. In justification of the reward the American Mathematical Society wrote:

"The 2010 Veblen Prize in Geometry is awarded to Tobias H. Colding and William P. Minicozzi II for their profound work on minimal surfaces. In a series of papers they have developed a structure theory for minimal surfaces with bounded genus in 3-manifolds, which yields a remarkable global picture for an arbitrary minimal surface of bounded genus. This contribution led to the resolution of long-standing conjectures of initiated a wave of new results. Specifically, they are cited for the following joint papers, of which the first four form a series of establishing the structure theory for embedded surfaces in 3-manifolds:

- Colding, Tobias H.; Minicozzi, William P. (2002). "The space of embedded minimal surfaces of fixed genus in a 3-manifold I; Estimates off the axis for disks". arXiv:math/0210106.
- Colding, Tobias H.; Minicozzi, William P. (2002). "The space of embedded minimal surfaces of fixed genus in a 3-manifold II; Multi-valued graphs in disks". arXiv:math/0210086.
- Colding, Tobias H.; Minicozzi, William P. (2002). "The space of embedded minimal surfaces of fixed genus in a 3-manifold III; Planar domains". arXiv:math/0210141.
- Colding, Tobias H.; Minicozzi, William P. (2002). "The space of embedded minimal surfaces of fixed genus in a 3-manifold IV; Locally simply connected". arXiv:math/0210119.
- Colding, Tobias H.; Minicozzi, William P. (2004). "The Calabi-Yau conjectures for embedded surfaces". arXiv:math/0404197.

In the final paper cited here, the authors show that a complete embedded minimal surface of finite genus is properly embedded, proving the embedded version of the Calabi-Yau conjectures."

== Honors ==
- Sloan Fellowship
- ICM Speaker
- Oswald Veblen Prize in Geometry
- Carlsberg Foundation Research Prize, 2016
- Rolf Schock Prize in Mathematics, 2026

== Major publications ==
- Cheeger, Jeff; Colding, Tobias H. (1996). "Lower Bounds on Ricci Curvature and the Almost Rigidity of Warped Products". The Annals of Mathematics. 144 (1): 189. doi:10.2307/2118589. JSTOR 2118589.
- Colding, Tobias H. (1997). "Ricci Curvature and Volume Convergence". The Annals of Mathematics. 145 (3): 477–501. doi:10.2307/2951841. JSTOR 2951841.
- Cheeger, Jeff; Colding, Tobias H. (1 January 1997). "On the structure of spaces with Ricci curvature bounded below. I". Journal of Differential Geometry. 46 (3). Bibcode:1997JDGeo..4659974C. doi:10.4310/jdg/1214459974. ISSN 0022-040X.
- Cheeger, Jeff; Colding, Tobias H. (1 January 2000). "On the structure of spaces with Ricci curvature bounded below. II". Journal of Differential Geometry. 54 (1) 42145. Bibcode:2000JDGeo..5442145C. doi:10.4310/jdg/1214342145. ISSN 0022-040X.
- Cheeger, Jeff; Colding, Tobias H. (1 January 2000). "On the structure of spaces with Ricci curvature bounded below. III". Journal of Differential Geometry. 54 (1) 42146. Bibcode:2000JDGeo..5442146C. doi:10.4310/jdg/1214342146. ISSN 0022-040X.
- Colding, Tobias; Minicozzi, William (1 March 2012). "Generic mean curvature flow I; generic singularities". Annals of Mathematics. 175 (2): 755–833. arXiv:0908.3788. doi:10.4007/annals.2012.175.2.7. ISSN 0003-486X.
