= Jean-Michel Bismut =

French mathematician (born 1948)

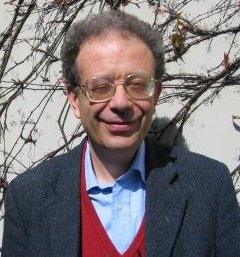
- Bismut in 2004 (photo from MFO)
- Born: 26 February 1948 (age 78); Lisbon, Portugal
- Education: Ecole Polytechnique
- Known for: Backward stochastic differential equations, Probabilistic proof of Atiyah–Singer index theorem, Bismut connection, Bismut superconnection, Geometric hypoelliptic Laplacian, Malliavin calculus, Explicit formulas for orbital integrals
- Awards: Prix Ampère (French Academy of Sciences), 1990; Shaw Prize, 2021
- Scientific career
- Fields: Mathematics
- Workplaces: Université Paris-Sud
- Doctoral advisor: Jacques-Louis Lions; Jacques Neveu

Jean-Michel Bismut (born 26 February 1948) is a French mathematician who has been a professor at the Université Paris-Sud since 1981. His mathematical career covers two apparently different branches of mathematics: probability theory and differential geometry. Ideas from probability play an important role in his works on geometry.

== Biography ==
Bismut's early work was related to stochastic differential equations, stochastic control, and Malliavin calculus, to which he made fundamental contributions.

Bismut received in 1973 his Docteur d'État in Mathematics, from the Université Paris-VI, a thesis entitled Analyse convexe et probabilités. In his thesis, Bismut established a stochastic version of Pontryagin's maximum principle in control theory by introducing and studying the backward stochastic differential equations which have been the starting point of an intensive research in stochastic analysis and it stands now as a major tool in Mathematical Finance.

Using the quasi-invariance of the Brownian measure, Bismut gave a new approach to the Malliavin calculus and a probabilistic proof of Hörmander's theorem. He established his celebrated integration by parts for the Brownian motion on manifolds.

Since 1984, Bismut works on differential geometry. He found a heat equation proof for the Atiyah–Singer index theorem. And he established a local version of the Atiyah-Singer families index theorem for Dirac operators, by introducing the Bismut superconnection which plays a central role in modern aspects of index theory.

Bismut-Freed developed the theory of Quillen metrics on the smooth determinant line bundle associated with a family of Dirac operators. Bismut-Gillet-Soulé gave a curvature theorem for the Quillen metric on the holomorphic determinant of a direct image by a holomorphic proper submersion. This and Bismut—Lebeau's embedding formula for analytic torsions play a crucial role in the proof of the arithmetic Riemann-Roch theorem in Arakelov theory, in which analytic torsion is an essential analytic ingredient in the definition of the direct image.

Bismut gave a natural construction of a Hodge theory whose corresponding Laplacian is a hypoelliptic operator acting on the total space of the cotangent bundle of a Riemannian manifold. This operator interpolates formally between the classical elliptic Laplacian on the base and the generator of the geodesic flow. One striking application is Bismut's explicit formulas for all orbital integrals at semi-simple elements of any reductive Lie group.

He was a visiting scholar at the Institute for Advanced Study in the summer of 1984. In 1990, he was awarded the Prix Ampere of the Academy of Sciences. He was elected as a member of the French Academy of Sciences in 1991. In 2021 he received the Shaw Prize in Mathematics (jointly with Jeff Cheeger).

In 1986, he was an invited speaker in the Geometry section at the ICM in Berkeley, and in 1998 he was a plenary speaker at the ICM in Berlin.

He was a member of the Fields Medal Committee for ICM 1990. From 1999 until 2006, a member of the executive committee (from 2003 until 2006 as vice-president), International Mathematical Union (IMU). He was an editor of Inventiones Mathematicae from 1989 until 1996 and managing editor from 1996 until 2008.

== Selected bibliography ==
- ——— (1973). "Conjugate convex functions in optimal stochastic control". Journal of Mathematical Analysis and Applications. 44 (2): 384–404. doi:10.1016/0022-247X(73)90066-8.
- ——— (1981). "Martingales, the Malliavin calculus and hypoellipticity under general Hörmander's conditions". Zeitschrift für Wahrscheinlichkeitstheorie und verwandte Gebiete. 56 (4): 469–505. doi:10.1007/BF00531428. S2CID 121589373.
- ——— (1984). "Large deviations and the Malliavin calculus". Progress in Mathematics. 45, Birkhäuser Boston Inc.: 216 pp.
- ——— (1986). "The Atiyah-Singer index theorem for families of Dirac operators: two heat equation proofs". Inventiones Mathematicae. 83: 91–151. Bibcode:1986InMat..83...91B. doi:10.1007/bf01388755. S2CID 122054656.
- ———; Lebeau, G. (1992). "Complex immersions and Quillen metrics". Publications Mathématiques de l'IHÉS. 74 (1991): 298 pp.
- ——— (2005). "The hypoelliptic Laplacian on the cotangent bundle". Journal of the American Mathematical Society. 18 (2): 379–476. doi:10.1090/S0894-0347-05-00479-0.
- ——— (2011). "Hypoelliptic Laplacian and orbital integrals". Annals of Mathematics Studies. 177, Princeton University Press, Princeton: 330 pp. doi:10.1515/9781400840571. ISBN 978-1-4008-4057-1.

== See also ==
- Bismut connection
- Atiyah–Singer index theorem
- List of École Polytechnique alumni
