= William Minicozzi =

American mathematician

William Philip Minicozzi II is an American mathematician. He was born in Bryn Mawr, Pennsylvania, in 1967.

== Career ==
Minicozzi graduated from Princeton University in 1990 and received his Ph.D. from Stanford University in 1994 under the direction of Richard Schoen. After graduating he spent a year at the Courant Institute of New York University as a visiting member where he began working with Tobias Colding on harmonic functions on Riemannian manifolds, work he was later invited to present at the Geometry Festival. In 1995, he went to the Johns Hopkins University, with a National Science Foundation postdoctoral fellowship.

Minicozzi became the J. J. Sylvester Professor of Mathematics at Johns Hopkins in 2002, and later became Krieger-Eisenhower Professor there. He turned to work on minimal surfaces, continuing to work with Tobias Colding. In 2012 he joined MIT as a professor of mathematics. Currently, they mainly work on the mean curvature flow and the Ricci flow.

In addition to his teaching and research duties, Minicozzi serves as an editor of the American Journal of Mathematics.

== Awards and honors ==
He won a Sloan Fellowship in 1998. He gave an invited address on this work at the 2006 ICM in Madrid, a London Mathematical Society Spitalfields Lecture in 2007, the thirty-fifth University of Arkansas Spring Lecture Series in 2010, and an AMS invited address in Syracuse in 2010.

In 2010 William P. Minicozzi received the Oswald Veblen Prize in Geometry together with Tobias Colding for their work on minimal surfaces. In justification of the reward the American Mathematical Society wrote:

The 2010 Veblen Prize in Geometry is awarded to Tobias H. Colding and William P. Minicozzi II for their profound work on minimal surfaces. In a series of papers they have developed a structure theory for minimal surfaces with bounded genus in 3-manifolds, which yields a remarkable global picture for an arbitrary minimal surface of bounded genus. This contribution led to the resolution of long-standing conjectures of initiated a wave of new results.

In 2012 he became a fellow of the American Mathematical Society.

== Selected publications ==
- Colding, Tobias H.; Minicozzi, William P., II (2004). "The Space of Embedded Minimal Surfaces of Fixed Genus in a 3-manifold. I. estimates off the Axis for Disks". Ann. of Math. 160 (1): 27–68. arXiv:math/0210106. doi:10.4007/annals.2004.160.27. MR 2119717. S2CID 10598766.
- Colding, Tobias H.; Minicozzi, William P., II (2004). "The Space of Embedded Minimal Surfaces of Fixed Genus in a 3-manifold. II. Multi-valued Graphs in Disks". Ann. of Math. 160 (1): 69–92. doi:10.4007/annals.2004.160.69. MR 2119718.
- Colding, Tobias H.; Minicozzi, William P., II (2004). "The Space of Embedded Minimal Surfaces of Fixed Genus in a 3-manifold. III. Planar Domains". Ann. of Math. 160 (2): 523–572. arXiv:math/0210141. doi:10.4007/annals.2004.160.523. MR 2123932. S2CID 13966528.
- Colding, Tobias H.; Minicozzi, William P., II (2004). "The Space of Embedded Minimal Surfaces of Fixed Genus in a 3-manifold. IV. Locally Simply Connected". Ann. of Math. 160 (2): 573–615. arXiv:math/0210119. doi:10.4007/annals.2004.160.573. MR 2123933. S2CID 6455672.
- Colding, Tobias H.; Minicozzi, William P., II (2015). "The Space of Embedded Minimal Surfaces of Fixed Genus in a 3-manifold V; Fixed genus". Ann. of Math. 181 (1): 1–153. arXiv:math/0509647. doi:10.4007/annals.2015.181.1.1. MR 3272923. S2CID 119660597.
- Colding, Tobias H.; Minicozzi, William P., II (2008). "The Calabi-Yau Conjectures for Embedded Surfaces". Ann. of Math. 167 (1): 211–243. arXiv:math/0404197. doi:10.4007/annals.2008.167.211. MR 2373154. S2CID 11923866.
