= Blanco White (surname) =

Blanco White is a surname, and may refer to:

- Amber Blanco White, married name of Amber Reeves (1887–1981), British feminist writer and scholar
- G. R. Blanco White (1883–1966), English barrister and judge
- Joseph Blanco White (1775–1841), Anglo-Spanish political thinker, theologian and poet
- Justin Blanco White (1911–2001), English architect
- Thomas Blanco White (1915–2006), British barrister

== See also ==
- Blanco (surname)
- White (surname)
