= State switching =

Physiological process

State switching (a.k.a. phenotypic switching) is a fundamental physiological process in which a cell/organism undergoes spontaneous, and potentially reversible, transitions between different phenotypes. Thus, the ability to switch states/phenotypes (phenotypic plasticity) is a key feature of development and normal function of cells within most multicellular organisms that enables the cell to respond to various intrinsic and extrinsic cues and stimuli in a concerted fashion enabling them to 'make' appropriate cellular decisions. Although state switching is essential for normal functioning, the repertoire of phenotypes in a normal cell is limited.

In contrast to normal cells, a striking characteristic of cancer cells is the remarkable degree of phenotypic plasticity they exhibit. For example, cancer cells undergo epithelial to mesenchymal transition (EMT) that plays important roles in their survival, proliferation, and development of resistance to therapeutic treatments, or switch to a phenotype that mimics stem cell-like features – the so-called Cancer Stem Cells (CSCs) or Tumour-initiating Cells. Unlike in the case of normal cells, state switching in cancer cells is widely believed to arise due to somatic mutations. However, there is growing concern that such a deterministic view of a phenomenon that is reversible is not entirely consistent with multiple lines of evidence which indicate that stochasticity may also play an important role in driving phenotypic plasticity.

== Intrinsically Disordered Proteins (IDPs) and state switching ==
A hallmark of the factors implicated in phenotypic switching whether in cancer or in normal cells is that they are Intrinsically disordered proteins (IDPs). That is, they lack a rigid 3D-structure under physiological conditions at least in vitro and exist as conformational ensembles instead. However, many IDPs can transition from disorder to order upon interacting with a target or in response to post-translational modifications such as phosphorylation. IDPs are particularly enriched in transcriptional regulation, signaling and splicing, and are overexpressed in many pathological states including cancer. Thus, the products of most oncogenes such as Jun, Fos, Myc, the Yamanaka factors namely, OCT3/4, SOX2, MYC, NANOG, and KLF4 that induce reprogramming of pluripotent stem (iPS) cells, and >90% of the Cancer/Testis Antigens several of which are implicated in EMT are predicted, and in many cases experimentally verified, to be IDPs. Consistent with these observations, the key factors implicated in EMT/MET namely, OVOL1/2, ZEB1 and SNAI1 are also strongly predicted to be IDPs.

== Scale-free Networks ==
Until the 1990s, it was tacitly assumed that most networks adopt a random architecture wherein an edge (connection) between each pair of nodes has equal probability, independent of the other edges (Erdős–Rényi model). However, pioneering work by Barabási and colleagues (Barabási–Albert model) indicated that biological networks, like many other networks they interrogated, adopt an architecture wherein the degree distribution P(k) exhibits a power-law behavior as a function of the degree k. In particular, P(k) ~ k-γ, with only a few nodes (hub nodes) has numerous edges while the majority of the nodes have very few edges. As such, these networks are robust to failure of random nodes but vulnerable to failure of hubs. In light of the scale-free topology of the PIN, Mahmoudabadi et al. set out to elucidate whether perturbation to IDP hub proteins could account for such dramatic changes as state switching in the absence of DNA mutations (changes to the DNA sequence) and whether these changes could be passed onto the progeny.

== The MRK Model explaining state switching ==
The authors proposed a theoretical model (hereby named the 'MRK model' after the main proponents- Gita Mahmoudabadi, Govindan Rangarajan, and Prakash Kulkarni) which envisaged that because IDPs have multiple conformational states and rapid conformational dynamics, they are prone to engage in 'promiscuous' interactions. These stochastic interactions between the IDPs and their partners result in 'noise', defined as conformational noise. Indeed, many biological processes are driven by probabilistic events underscoring the importance of 'noise' in biological systems. However, while research on biological noise focused on low gene copy numbers as the predominant source of noise, noise arising from stochastic IDP interactions due to the conformational dynamics of IDPs had not been considered. Thus, the central tenet of the MRK model is that, just as transcriptional noise plays an important role in probabilistic differentiation and adaptation, noise inherent in protein interactions could underlie the activation of latent pathways and cellular transformation. Although the authors chose to highlight the role of IDPs in propagation of transcriptional noise because this type of noise has systematically been studied and is a common feature of cellular processes in both normal and diseased conditions, they also point out that the role of IDPs is not limited to the propagation of transcriptional noise. Rather, the model emphasizes that IDPs could likely relay, and perhaps, even amplify, other intrinsic and extrinsic types of noise and perturbations in the system. Consistent with this argument, there are now numerous examples of remodeling of the IDP conformational ensemble in response to binding and/or post-translational modifications to populate a different conformation with huge functional consequences.

Together, these observations tend to suggest that contrary to the prevailing wisdom that phenotype specification is highly deterministic, stochasticity may be a confounding factor in specifying cell fate. This thinking may also help explain how a given cell can reversibly switch phenotypes as seen in EMT and MET or for that matter, a drug-sensitive cell from developing resistance and switching back to drug sensitivity, or the transformation of a normal cell to a malignant one and its reversal to normalcy. Indeed, such stochasticity in phenotypic switching is also thought to underlie cellular differentiation, generation of induced pluripotent stem cells (iPS cells), tumor heterogeneity and emergence of cancer stem cells from non-stem cancer cells. Implicit in the MRK model, the PIN configuration contains information that can specify the cell's phenotype.

== Learning and evolution ==
It seems quite reasonable to assume that organisms acquire useful adaptations during their lifetime. Such adaptations are the result of an exploratory search which samples various iterations of potential outputs in order to discern and select the most appropriate ones. Thus, it is plausible that 'learning', which can be described as an elaborate and iterative form of phenotypic modification that allows an organism to adjust its response to the same inputs over time based on the outcomes of previous outputs, could have a significant influence on evolution of a new species in the long run. Therefore, it would be quite wasteful to forego the advantage of the exploration performed by the organism to facilitate the evolutionary search for increased fitness if information about the acquired (learned) characteristics (new phenotypes) was not transferred to the genotype or at least retained in some (non-genomic) fashion to facilitate transgenerational inheritance. Indeed, this type of interaction between learning and evolution was independently proposed in the late 1800s by Baldwin, Osborn and Morgan and is often referred to as the 'Baldwin effect'. However, the Baldwin effect remained under-appreciated because of its Lamarckian connotation and consequently it was inferred by many that learning cannot guide evolution.

In 1987, Hinton & Nowlan using a computer simulation demonstrated that indeed, learning (they actually meant phenotypic plasticity) can be very effective in guiding the evolutionary search. In fact, the authors observed that learning alters (smoothens) the shape of the search space in which evolution operates and predicted that in difficult evolutionary searches that may require many possibilities to be tested, each learning trial can be almost as helpful to the evolutionary search as the production and evaluation of a whole new organism. Thus, logically speaking, the 'efficiency' of evolution is greatly enhanced since a learning trial is much faster and far less energy-intensive than that required for the production of a whole organism by random mutations. Subsequent studies by Behara and Nanjundiah demonstrated that although the relationship may not be as straightforward as was assumed by Hinton & Nowlan, phenotypic plasticity can potentiate evolution even when more realistic fitness schemes are simulated.

Although these computational studies are tantalizing, the real question is, can cancer cells (or other protists, for that matter) really 'learn' or 'make' decisions? To describe the cell's physiological response to a stimulus as learning/decision making is perhaps a matter of semantics. However, several observations made in protists that lack even the rudiments of a nervous system, much less a brain, suggest that they possess sophisticated mechanisms through which they respond to, 'anticipate', and even 'learn' from fluctuations and challenges in their environment.

While cancer cells are not protists per se, they exhibit several characteristics that are typical of these simple forms of life. In fact, cancer has been postulated to represents some sort of reversion to a more primitive phenotype – an atavism. In the atavistic model of cancer progression, tumor cell dedifferentiation is interpreted as a reversion to phylogenetically earlier capabilities. For example, cancer cells, develop drug resistance, exhibit traits of the persister phenotype (an extremely slow-growing physiological state which makes them insensitive to drug treatment) and quorum sensing (a system of stimulus and response correlated to population density), and display many other collective behaviour capabilities and cooperative strategies necessary for survival under extreme stress. These characteristics present cancer cells in a different light – smart communicating cells – and tend to portray tumours as societies of cells capable of making decisions. Thus, the MRK model posits that the stochasticity in interactions of IDPs that are overexpressed in cancer cells could facilitate learning by exploring the network search space and rewiring the network.

But how is the organization of the networks specified? What determines the network dynamics? How does this affect learning? Kulkarni hypothesized that analogous to the computational models developed by Hinton & Nowlan, and Behera & Nanjundiah, the basic design of the PINs is specified by the genome inasmuch as the expression of the critical nodes in space, time and amplitude are concerned. However, the ultimate organization of the PIN and its ground state threshold would be determined by learning and adapting to the environment in which the organism finds itself.

== Inheritance of adaptive learning or phenotypic plasticity: Can information transfer be reversed (from phenotype to genotype)? ==
For adaptive learning to be inherited, one would anticipate that changes in the genome, whether genetic or epigenetic, would be necessary implying a reversal of information flow from phenotype to genotype. In response to dynamic environmental fluctuations, an organism's PINs constantly process information and organize and reorganize themselves. However, it is postulated that in response to 'unanticipated' environmental changes, several IDPs are overexpressed and the organism explores numerous iterations of network connections many of which are due to the promiscuous nature of these interactions. This results in a specific output that the organism benefits from, and in resetting the network to a new set-point (threshold). Further, it is postulated that information derived from PIN rewiring can operate across diverse timescales. Thus, while some of the information particularly that which operates over relatively short timescales maybe retained within the PINS, information that operates over long periods such as cellular transformation, development and evolution, is directly transferred to the genome to effect heritable genetic/epigenetic changes, or via a mechanism similar to genetic assimilation of the acquired character proposed by Waddington. Several proteins that are involved in epigenetically sculpturing the chromatin are IDPs.

Insofar as genetic changes are concerned, emerging evidence suggests that a nexus between transcription factors and chromatin remodelers, and between transcription factors and DNA repair proteins that are part of large PINs, can facilitate such changes. With regard to genetic assimilation, Waddington proposed that it is the process in which an environmental stimulus that affects the phenotype has been superseded by an internal genetic factor during the course of evolution. While such mechanisms could potentially account for permanent changes in the diploid genome of the cancer cell or other unicellular organisms, how information to activate such an internal genetic switch is transmitted to the germline for stable inheritance in metazoans reproducing sexually remains an important and intriguing question.

Notwithstanding the molecular mechanisms however, an equally important question that needs to be considered here is the evolutionary timescale. A key point in Darwinian evolution is that it works very slowly, over millions of years of geological time, through the gradual, incremental acquisition of small differences. Then how can a cancer cell evolve in such a short time? Perhaps, as has been suggested, under certain conditions evolution could occur more rapidly than previously envisioned. For example, in the extreme case, in a population of just a few individuals, all sorts of unusual mutations could become fixed simply because the number of individuals was so small and each mutation has a much higher likelihood of survival because competition among mutant forms is lower. Through this process a new species can arise in a few generations. However, in either case, mutations that hold the key arise by chance and without foresight for the potential advantage or disadvantage of the mutation. Furthermore, the underlying implication would be a unidirectional flow of information from genotype to phenotype.

On the other hand, in the scenario resulting from the MRK model wherein learning can guide evolution, changes to the genome arise due to necessity after trial and error and not just by chance, and in a few generations, are fixed. Episodes of rapid change - network rewiring to uncover latent pathway interactions in response to environmental perturbations - could lead to genotypic changes in a relatively short order. In other words, a species need not originate in a series of gradual steps, each resulting from a mutation with a small effect, slowly changing ancestor into descendant. Rather, the genetic changes that lead to the formation of new species have large effects and happen over relatively few generations. Thus, the MRK model implies that informational flow would be bidirectional and has parallels to ideas enunciated by Lamarck although empirical evidence for informational flow from phenotype to genotype is lacking at present. In fact, the inheritance of characteristics induced by the environment has often been opposed to the theory of evolution by natural selection. However, the emergence of non-conventional modes and the diversity of mechanisms for generating and transmitting variations such as the transmission of small interfering RNAs, the transmission of conformational states of IDPs such as prions, or, at the cellular level, the transmission of self-sustaining states of gene regulation, and, at the organismal level, so-called parental effects could provide additional support for the MRK theory.

Indeed, a recently proposed mathematical model to compare the adaptive value of different schemes of inheritance by Rivoire and Leibler does appear to lend credence to the MRK model. The authors considered three biological phenomena that are often considered to be either irrelevant to evolution, or absent because "forbidden" namely, i) role of phenotypic plasticity and developmental canalization, ii) reverse flow of information from phenotype to genotype (or its absence), and iii) conditions under which direct integration of information into the transmitted genotype is logically excluded as a consequence of natural selection. Their model allows for variations to be inherited, randomly produced, or environmentally induced, and, irrespectively, to be either transmitted or not during reproduction. The adaptation of the different schemes for processing variations is quantified for a range of fluctuating environments, following an approach that links quantitative genetics with stochastic control theory. When the authors conducted a Gedankenexperiment (German for a thought-experiment) that allowed them to compare the Darwinian and Lamarckian "modalities," and test the conjecture that each of them is tuned to a different type of selective pressure, they found that the main controlling parameter in the model appears to be the correlation a of the environmental fluctuations, with the Lamarckian modality systematically becoming more favorable when this correlation is large, in line with the intuition that transmitting acquired information is beneficial when the selective pressure experienced by the offspring is sufficiently similar to that experienced by the parents.
