= Thomas Blanco White =

British patent lawyer (1915–2006)

- Born: 19 January 1915; Kensington, London
- Died: 12 January 2006 (aged 90)
- Education: Trinity College, Cambridge
- Parent(s): George Rivers Blanco White and Amber Reeves
- Relatives: Justin Blanco White (sister); Maud Pember Reeves (grandmother); William Pember Reeves (grandfather); Conrad Waddington (brother-in-law); Dusa McDuff (niece); Caroline Humphrey (niece)
- Military career
- Allegiance: United Kingdom
- Branch: Air Force
- Service years: 1940-1946
- Conflicts: World War II

Thomas Anthony Blanco White QC (19 January 1915 – 12 January 2006) was a British barrister specializing in patent law.

He was described in his Times obituary as "the best intellectual property lawyer to have practised in England since Fletcher Moulton" and "cultured, straight-talking lawyer who was without peer on intellectual property issues."

== Early life and family ==
Born in Kensington, White was the son of the barrister George Rivers Blanco White and his wife the feminist writer, scholar, and campaigner Amber Reeves, daughter of William Pember Reeves and his wife Maud Pember Reeves. His sister, Margaret Justin Blanco White, was an architect, and through her his brother-in-law was the biologist Conrad Hal Waddington - their daughters, his nieces, are the anthropologist Caroline Humphrey and the mathematician Dusa McDuff.

He was educated at University College School and Gresham's School, before going to his father's alma mater Trinity College, Cambridge, where he read physics. He was called to the bar at Lincoln's Inn in 1937.

== Career ==
Blanco White served with the Royal Air Force Volunteer Reserve from 1940 to 1946 (service No. 80865), working on the then-new field of radar, primarily in India and Ceylon.

After the Second World War, he returned to the bar, becoming a specialist in intellectual property law. He was made Queen's Counsel in 1969.

== Personal life ==
In 1950, Blanco White married Anne Katherine Ironside-Smith; they had two sons and one daughter.

== Publications ==
His textbook Patents for Inventions (1962) was the leading reference work in its day.

== Recognition ==
Blanco White was inducted into the Intellectual Property Hall of Fame in 2010.

An intellectual property library in Delhi has been named for him.
