= G. R. Blanco White =

English judge

- G. R. Blanco White in army uniform, c. 1918
- Born: 8 May 1883; Fulham, London, England
- Died: 26 March 1966 (aged 82); London, England
- Education: Trinity College, Cambridge
- Spouse: Amber Reeves (m. 1909)
- Children: 3, including Thomas and Justin
- Relatives: Dusa McDuff (granddaughter); Caroline Humphrey (granddaughter); Conrad Waddington (son-in-law); Maud Pember Reeves (mother-in-law); William Pember Reeves (father-in-law)
- Military career
- Allegiance: United Kingdom
- Service: Royal Garrison Artillery
- Conflicts: World War I

George Rivers Blanco White QC (8 May 1883 – 26 March 1966) was an English judge, Recorder of Croydon from 1940 to 1956, and a member of the Special Divorce Commission, from 1948 to 1957.

== Biography ==
The son of Thomas and Margaret Elizabeth Blanco White, he was born in Fulham, London. He was educated at St Paul's School, London and Trinity College, Cambridge, from where he graduated second wrangler behind Arthur Eddington in 1904, and was awarded Smith's Prize in 1906. He was called to the bar at Lincoln's Inn in 1907.

On 7 May 1909, he married Amber Reeves, feminist writer, scholar and campaigner. She was the daughter of William Pember Reeves and his wife Maud Pember Reeves. She bore a daughter Anna-Jane in December that year whose biological father was the author H. G. Wells (though Blanco White was Anna's legal father). The Blanco Whites later had a daughter, Margaret Justin Blanco White (1911–2001), who became an architect, and a son Thomas Blanco White (1915–2006), a patent lawyer. Through Margaret he was the grandfather of anthropologist Caroline Humphrey and mathematician Dusa McDuff.

He served in World War I with the Royal Garrison Artillery. He stood for the Labour Party at the 1929 Holland with Boston by-election, coming second to Liberal James Blindell.

He was made King's Counsel in 1936. He became a Bencher of Lincoln's Inn in 1940 in replacement of Henry Chartres Biron. He died in London in 1966 and received obituaries in The Times and The Guardian.
