= Alastair McIntosh =

British writer and academic

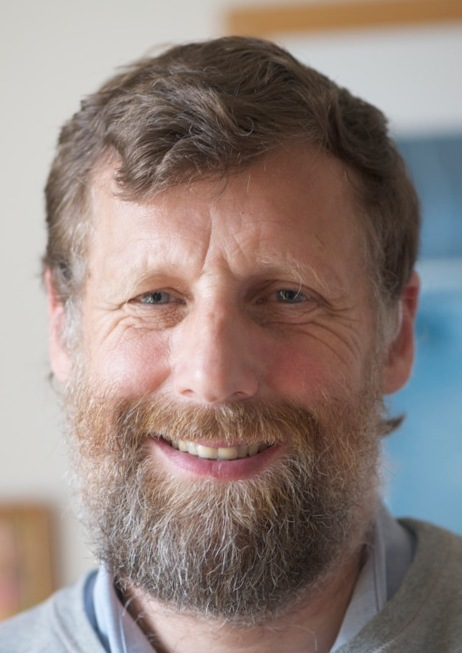
- Alastair McIntosh, in 2010.
- Born: 1955 (age 70–71)
- Education: Universities of Aberdeen (BSc), Edinburgh (MBA), Ulster (PhD)
- Occupations: Writer, academic and activist
- Spouse: Vérène Nicolas

Alastair McIntosh is a Scottish writer, academic and activist.

He was brought up in Leurbost on the Isle of Lewis and is married to Vérène Nicolas. He is involved with Scottish land reform especially on Eigg and campaigned successfully against the Harris superquarry in Lingerbay. He is a fellow of the Centre for Human Ecology, an Honorary Fellow of the Schumacher Society, and helped to set up the Govan based GalGael Trust of which he is Treasurer and a non-executive director. In 2006 he was appointed to the honorary position of visiting professor of Human Ecology at the University of Strathclyde (Department of Geography & Sociology) – the first such post in Human ecology in a Scottish university.

Alastair also features on Nizlopi's mini album 'Extraordinary' on the track titled 'Homage To Young Men'.

== Education ==
He holds a BSc in geography, submajoring in moral philosophy and psychology from the University of Aberdeen (1977), a financial MBA from the University of Edinburgh (1981), and in 2008 the Academy of Irish Cultural Heritages (of which he is a Visiting Fellow) at the University of Ulster approved the award of PhD by Published Work based on Soil and Soul and twelve supporting publications presented with a short linking thesis, 'Some Contributions of Liberation Theology to Community Empowerment in Scottish Land Reform 1991-2003'. Parts of this were published in 2008 as Schumacher Briefing No. 15: 'Rekindling Community: Connecting People, Environment and Spirituality'.

== Publications ==
His best-known work is his 2001 book Soil and Soul: People Versus Corporate Power. In 2006 he published his collected poetry, Love and Revolution. His 2008 book on the psychology and spirituality underlying climate change "Hell and High Water: Climate Change, Hope and the Human Condition" was described by Michael Russell MSP, Minister for the Environment in the Scottish Government as "a profoundly important book, just as Soil and Soul was a profoundly important book."

=== Bibliography ===
- Healing Nationhood: Essays on Spirituality, Place and Community, Curlew Productions, May 2000, ISBN 1-900259-95-8
- Soil and Soul: People versus Corporate Power, Aurum Press, October 2001, ISBN 1-85410-942-1
- Love and Revolution: Collected Poetry, Luath Press, September 2006, ISBN 1-905222-58-0
- Hell and High Water: Climate Change, Hope and the Human Condition, Birlinn, June 2008, ISBN 1-84158-622-6
- Rekindling Community: Connecting People, Environment and Spirituality, Green Books, September 2008, ISBN 1-900322-38-2, Alastair McIntosh and colleagues in association with WWF International and the Centre for Human Ecology
- Spiritual Activism: Leadership as Service, by Alastair McIntosh and Matt Carmichael, Green Books (UK), September 2014, ISBN 9780857843005. Published in North America by UIT Cambridge Ltd., October 2015, ISBN 9780857843005
- Poacher's Pilgrimage: an Island Journey, Birlinn Books (UK), ISBN 9781780274683.
- Riders on the Storm: the Climate Crisis and the Survival of Being, Birlinn Books (UK), August 2020, ISBN 9781780276397

== See also ==
- Human ecology
- Spiritual ecology
