= Jessica Hua =

Herpetologist

- Education: Purdue University (Postdoc); University of Pittsburgh (PhD); Southwestern University (BA)
- Known for: Studying the influence of anthropogenic chemicals on aquatic life
- Scientific career
- Fields: Herpetology, Toxicology, Ecology, Evolution
- Workplaces: Binghamton University
- Website: jhua13.wixsite.com/jhua

Jessica Hua is a professor in the Department of Forest and Wildlife Ecology at University of Wisconsin–Madison, WI. In addition Hua was the Director for the Center for Integrated Watershed Studies at Binghamton University which focuses on understanding watersheds and the human influences on them through research. She is a herpetologist and oversees her own lab, The Hua Lab, where they focus on ecological interactions, evolutionary processes and ecological-evolutionary feedbacks. Hua's background has led to her appreciation of education with coming from a refugee family who "epitomizes the concept of the American Dream". Her research aims to help others gain opportunities while also establishing a lab that is inclusive and diverse. Hua also enjoys a variety of sports and plays disc golf professionally since 2016.

== Education ==
Hua received her Bachelor of Arts Degree in Biology and Kinesiology from Southwestern University, TX, in 2008 where she had gone to the university for basketball and picked biology for her major with the intention of going to medical school. However, in her Junior year of college she had gotten a lab position with Ben Pierce who ultimately changed her career interests towards research and studying herpetology.

Following her completion of her B.A., Hua went to the University of Pittsburgh, PA, and received her Ph.D. in 2014. Hua worked with Rick Relyea on researching the effects of contaminants on amphibians. This experience led Hua to become a Herpetologists' League member. The article "Differential Host Susceptibility to Batrachochytrium dendrobatidis, an Emerging Amphibian Pathogen" was published during her graduate education in which she was a co-author for. The research was focused on a fungal pathogen that afflicted amphibians, called Batrachochytrium dendrobatidis, and how amphibian species varied in their sensitivity to this pathogen.

== Career and research ==
=== Post-doctorate ===
Hua completed her postdoc at Purdue University, IN, from 2014 to 2015. She had studied amphibian disease ecology along with her advisor Jason Hoverman. In her research article on "The contribution of phenotypic plasticity to the evolution of insecticide tolerance in amphibian populations" she discussed how wood frog populations were seen to have higher tolerance to the pesticide carbaryl when they lived closer to agriculture compared to wood frog populations that were further from farmlands, which follows the evolutionary responses known for pesticides. There was also constitutive tolerance (tolerance that is always expressed despite environmental conditions) seen for frog populations near agriculture but was not seen in populations that were away from agriculture, leading Hua to note that genetic assimilation, a process cause by phenotypic plasticity, may be influencing evolutionary responses with unique environments.

=== Teaching ===
At Binghamton University Hua has taught a variety of courses on ecology. These classes aim to educate students on the principles of ecology, how to apply ecology, the significance and diversity of wetlands, as well as how humans impact ecology.

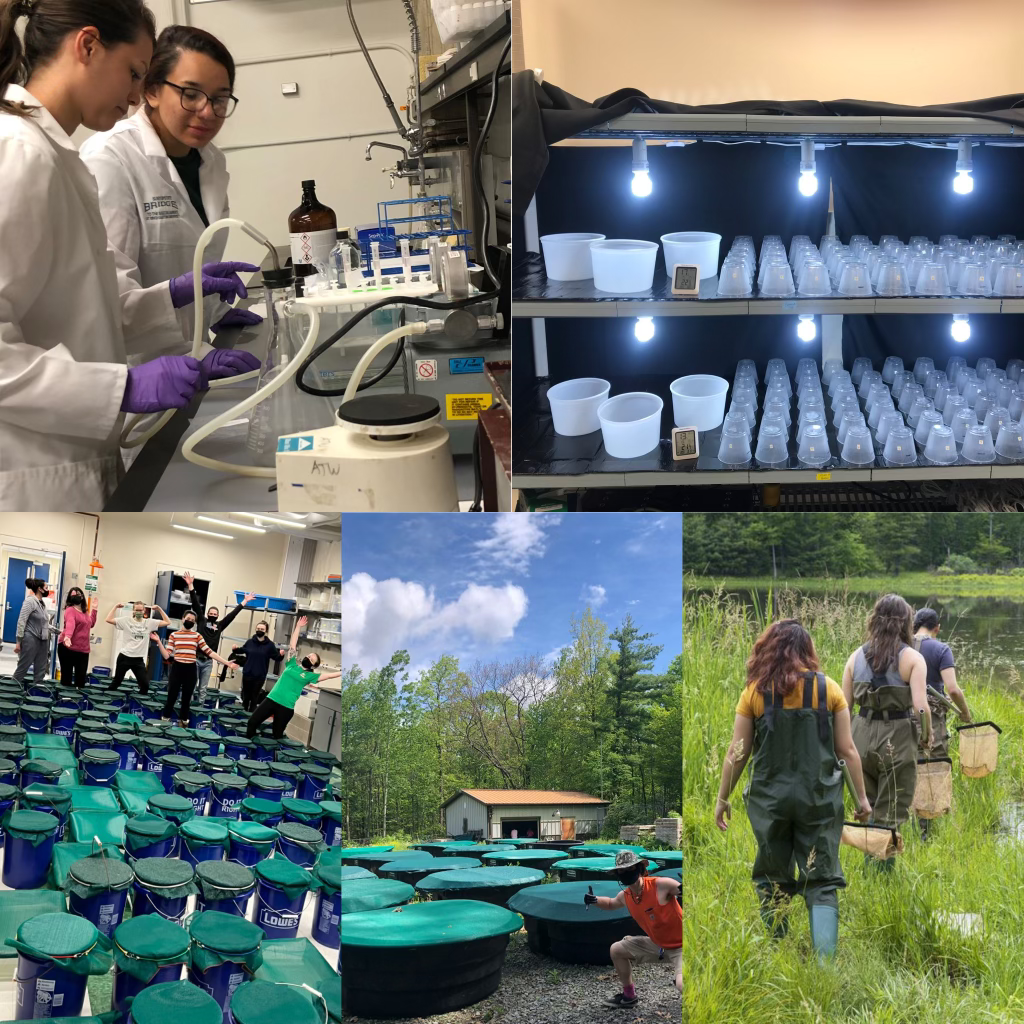
Here is how ecotoxicological research in the Hua lab is conducted, studying how amphibians are effected by light pollution and the influence of pollutants on wetlands as well as field studies on the effects of amphibian biodiversity on emerging diseases.

=== Research ===
The Hua Lab investigates mechanisms involving ecology, evolution, and ecological-evolutionary feedbacks. Hua focuses her lab's research on understanding the impact of chemicals on aquatic systems through ecological and evolutionary mechanisms while working with a variety of organisms from amphibians to insects to isopods.

==== Ecotoxicology ====
Researches human interaction in ecology to understand how human-related activities, such as pollution, has impacted aquatic ecosystems at all levels of the ecosystem. Questions being explored involve species interactions, responses to pollutants and how human activities impact ecological interactions. To study ecotoxicology, field research is conducted as well as DNA extractions, mesocosm studies and a variety of assays including ones on toxicity, behaviors and waterborne corticosterone.

==== Evotoxicology ====
This is an evolutionary approach on toxicology interested in researching if wildlife can become tolerant to pollutants through evolving tolerance to toxins such as pesticides. Model systems of wood frogs are used to study this topic since wood frogs have a high degree of variance with their pollutant tolerance. In lab they have seen that wood frog populations near agriculture have higher tolerance to the insecticides which shows evolved tolerance to pesticides.

==== Ecological-evolutionary feedbacks (disease ecology) ====
This area of research focuses on human activities impacting ecology through studying evolution. The questions asked here consist of how evolving pollutant tolerance can be associated with ecological costs or how plasticity to pollutants influence species relationships and interactions in the environment. Three types of parasites have been significant in this topic of research including trematodes, Ranavirus and Batrachochytrium dendrobatidis. Future directions with this research involve collaborations with varying people and labs such as Devin Jones, Relyea, Hoverman labs, Obed Hernandez Gomez and Ivan Gomez-Mestre.

== Outreach ==
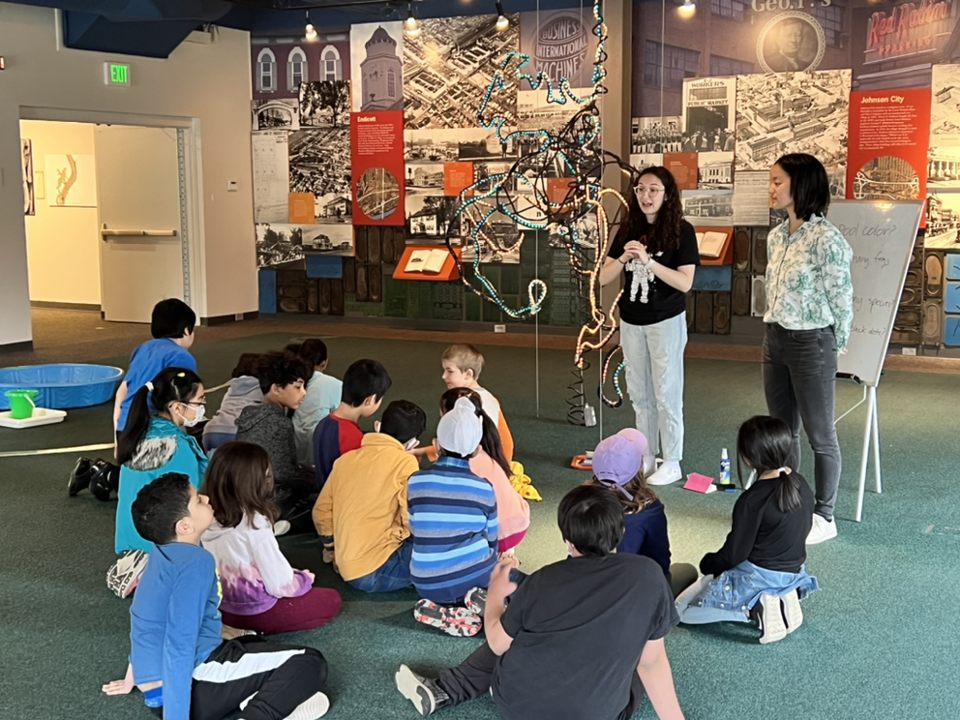
Community outreach on ecology with local schools by the Hua Lab where their team of artists generated a graphic novel to teach 3rd graders about wetland diversity.

The Hua Lab does a variety of outreach in their community from the local elementary schools up to high school students and the general public to learn and interact with ecology hands-on. Hua had stated that "We're hoping to change perceptions and decouple the idea of 'these are humans — and this is wildlife.' Instead, we want people to realize that everything is connected". She views that communicating research effectively to the broader population is vital to making a difference in the world.

=== Hua Lab Wild Waders ===
This program incorporates field ecology with art to create a hands-on experience with studying nature in order to showcase the diversity of wetland organisms, discuss current issues putting these ecosystems at risk and to illustrate the significance of ecological and evolutionary perspectives for conservation of wetlands. The Hua Lab has hosted art shows for this program including in 2017 called "Where the Wetlands End" and in 2016 "Tadpoles, Trematodes, and Toxins- Oh My!". One art show Hua had measured how effective this outreach was in the community by doing pre and post surveys which lead to there being a 20% increase in understanding the importance of wetlands.

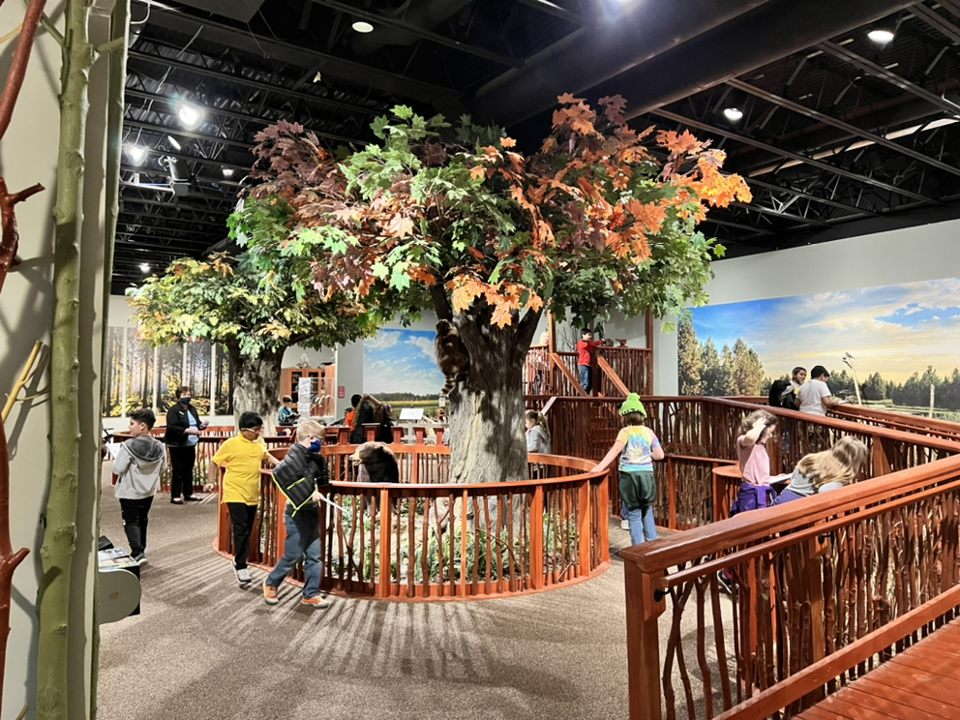
Local 3rd graders during their field trip to the Roberson Museum and Science Center where they interacted with scientists in the Hua lab to help collect real amphibian biodiversity data for the lab.

=== Evolution: Teacher's K-12 Workshop ===
Aims to explain the theory of evolution through scientific content and instructional strategies in a 6-day workshop to high school teachers who in turn will teach their classrooms these concepts.

=== Creek Connections ===
Introduces high schoolers to the waterways in their local community with the partnership of Allegheny College and K-12 schools.

=== Humans, Chemicals, and the Environment: Teacher's K-12 Workshop ===
Instructs teachers on current research in ecotoxicology to improve knowledge on how chemicals influence nature with a focus on ecological and evolutionary principles in a 6-day workshop.

=== Fish Hatchery Open House ===
An educational exhibit for the public about wildlife habitats with the partnership of PA State Hatchery.

== Grants ==
Hua had most recently received the National Science Foundation Career Award which the grant provides $947,030 for her research on evolutionary disease ecology. The project is titled "Evolutionary Disease Ecology - Can Evolutionary Responses to Environmental Change Modify the Biodiversity-Disease Relationship?" and will receive funding from March 2022 through February 2027. This award will allow Hua to dive further in her research to understand if variances in tolerance to pesticides affect biodiversity and its relationship with disease susceptibility since increased biodiversity is usually seen to have decreased susceptibility to diseases, however this concept is not fully understood. There is also an educational aspect to this project to showcase the interconnections of ecology and disease by featuring a citizen science program where third-grade students and their teachers from local communities can learn about data collection in a hands-on manner which will be used by the lab and they will get to learn about biodiversity and its relationship with disease. Another grant Hua has received for $251,407 was the National Science Foundation Division of Environmental Biology Population and Community Ecology (2017-2022).

== Honors and awards ==
Award	Year
National Wetlands Award - Promoting Awareness	2022
SUNY Chancellor's Award for Excellence in Scholarship and Creative Activities	2022
Provost Award for Faculty Excellence in Community - Engaged Scholarship	2021
Harpur College Teaching Award	2017

== Select publications ==
- Searle, C.L., Gervasi, S.S., Hua, J., Hammond, J.I., Relyea, R.A., Olson, D.H. and Blaustein, A.R. (2011), Differential Host Susceptibility to Batrachochytrium dendrobatidis, an Emerging Amphibian Pathogen. Conservation Biology, 25: 965-974. https://doi.org/10.1111/j.1523-1739.2011.01708.x
- Hua, J., Morehouse, N.I. and Relyea, R. (2013), Pesticide tolerance in amphibians: induced tolerance in susceptible populations, constitutive tolerance in tolerant populations. Evol Appl, 6: 1028-1040. https://doi.org/10.1111/eva.12083
- Gervasi, S.S., Urbina, J., Hua, J., Chestnut, T., Relyea, R., and Blaustein, A.R. (2013), Experimental Evidence for American Bullfrog (Lithobates catesbeianus) Susceptibility to Chytrid Fungus (Batrachochytrium dendrobatidis). EcoHealth, 10:166–171. https://doi.org/10.1007/s10393-013-0832-8
- Hua, J. and Relyea, R. (2014), Chemical cocktails in aquatic systems: Pesticide effects on the response and recovery of >20 animal taxa. Environmental Pollution, 189: 18-26. https://doi.org/10.1016/j.envpol.2014.02.007
- Miles, J.C., Hua J., Sepulveda, M.S., Krupke, C.H. and Hoverman, J.T. (2018), Correction: Effects of clothianidin on aquatic communities: Evaluating the impacts of lethal and sublethal exposure to neonicotinoids. PLOS ONE 13(3): e0194634. https://doi.org/10.1371/journal.pone.0194634
- Shidemantle, G., Buss, N. and Hua, J. (2022), Are glucocorticoids good indicators of disturbance across populations that exhibit cryptic variation in contaminant tolerance?. Animal Conservation, 25: 273-284. https://doi.org/10.1111/acv.12737
