= Colin MacLeod =

Colin MacLeod, Macleod or McLeod may refer to:

- Colin Munro MacLeod (1909–1972), Canadian-American geneticist
- Colin William Macleod (1943–1981), British classical scholar, educator and author
- Colin McLeod (engineer) (1921–2018), New Zealand civil engineer
- Colin Murdo Macleod (1966–2005), founder of GalGael Trust
- Colin MacLeod, the lead character of Highlander: The Search for Vengeance
