= Creode =

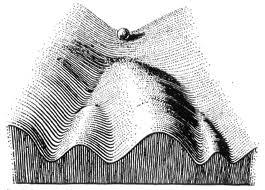

Creode or chreod is a neologistic portmanteau term coined by the English 20th century biologist C. H. Waddington to represent the developmental pathway followed by a cell as it grows to form part of a specialized organ. Combining the Greek roots for "necessary" and "path," the term was inspired by the property of regulation. When development is disturbed by external forces, the embryo attempts to regulate its growth and differentiation by returning to its normal developmental trajectory.

== Developmental biology ==
Waddington used the term along with canalisation and homeorhesis, which describes a system that returns to a steady trajectory, in contrast to homeostasis, which describes a system which returns to a steady state. Waddington explains development with the metaphor of a ball rolling down a hillside, where the hill's contours channel the ball in a particular direction. In the case of a pathway or creode which is deeply carved in the hillside, external disturbance is unlikely to prevent normal development. He notes that creodes tend to have steeper sides earlier in development, when external disturbance rarely suffices to alter the developmental trajectory. Small differences in placement atop the hill can lead to dramatically different results by the time the ball reaches the bottom. This represents the tendency of neighboring regions of the early embryo to develop into different organs with radically different structures. Since intermediate structures rarely exist between organs, each ball that rolls down the hill is "canalised" to a region distinct from other regions, just as an eye, for instance, is distinct from an ear.

Waddington refers to the network of creodes carved into the hillside as an "epigenetic landscape," meaning that the formation of the body depends on not only its genetic makeup but the different ways genes are expressed in different regions of the embryo. He expands his metaphor by describing the underside of the epigenetic landscape. Here we see that the "landscape" is really more like a giant sheet that would blow away except that a series of tension-bearing cables holds it down. The pegs that connect the cables to the ground are the genes. The cables themselves are the epigenetic factors that influence gene expression in various regions of the embryo. The depth and direction of the channels is thus determined by a combination of genetic makeup and the epigenetic feedback loops by which genes are regulated.

While Waddington does assert that the process of development is genetically driven, he makes no attempt to explain how this works and even offers evidence to the contrary. He observes, for instance, that genes ordinarily determine peripheral traits, such as eye color, rather than "focal" traits, such as the structure of the eye itself. Moreover, when genetic mutation influences basic structures, the result tends to be the complete transformation of a structure into another rather than piecemeal change, which Waddington illustrates with the developmental ball rolling out of one creode into another. Thus his account gives the impression that genes influence development, perhaps altering the course of a region of cells, without determining the endpoints toward which the embryo develops.

This interpretation is further reinforced by Waddington's discussion of the organization of the gene pool, where he points out that "the epigenetic process occurring during the development of the organism might be so buffered or canalized that the optimum end-result is produced irrespective of the genes which the individual contains." The more deeply creodes are carved into the epigenetic landscape, the weaker the influence of genes over development. He also argues that deep creodes will resist not only genetic but environmental pressures to change course. This phenomenon, which he calls "stabilizing selection," puts genes and environment on a par in secondary importance compared to the epigenetic system.

Waddington's emphasis on epigenetics over genes prefigured the current interest in evolutionary developmental biology. As Sean B. Carroll and others have explained, genes involved in development are roughly the same in all animal species, from insect to primate. Instead of mutations in developmental genes, evolution has been driven by changes in gene expression, namely which genes are expressed at which times and locations in the developing organism.

== Architecture ==
Architectural theorist Sanford Kwinter described the concept of the chreod as "the most important concept of the 20th century." The word "chreod" also closely describes paths of decision within what Christopher Alexander has called configuration space, his term for what he notes that Stuart Kaufmann calls "fitness landscape." By Alexander's theory, because conscious human design decisions do not need to follow these chreods, conscious human design can lead to mixed results. Therefore, he proposes that discovering ways to allow architecture to follow these paths is the best way to get good results in the built environment. Alexander sees his theories of "The Fundamental Process", "structure preserving transformations" and "15 fundamental properties" which he outlines in his work The Nature of Order as instrumentally shaping paths through configuration space.

== See also ==
- Cell biology
- Systems biology

== Sources ==
- C.H. Waddington, The Strategy of the Genes, George Allen & Unwin, 1957
