= Katrin Wehrheim =

German-American mathematician (born 1974)

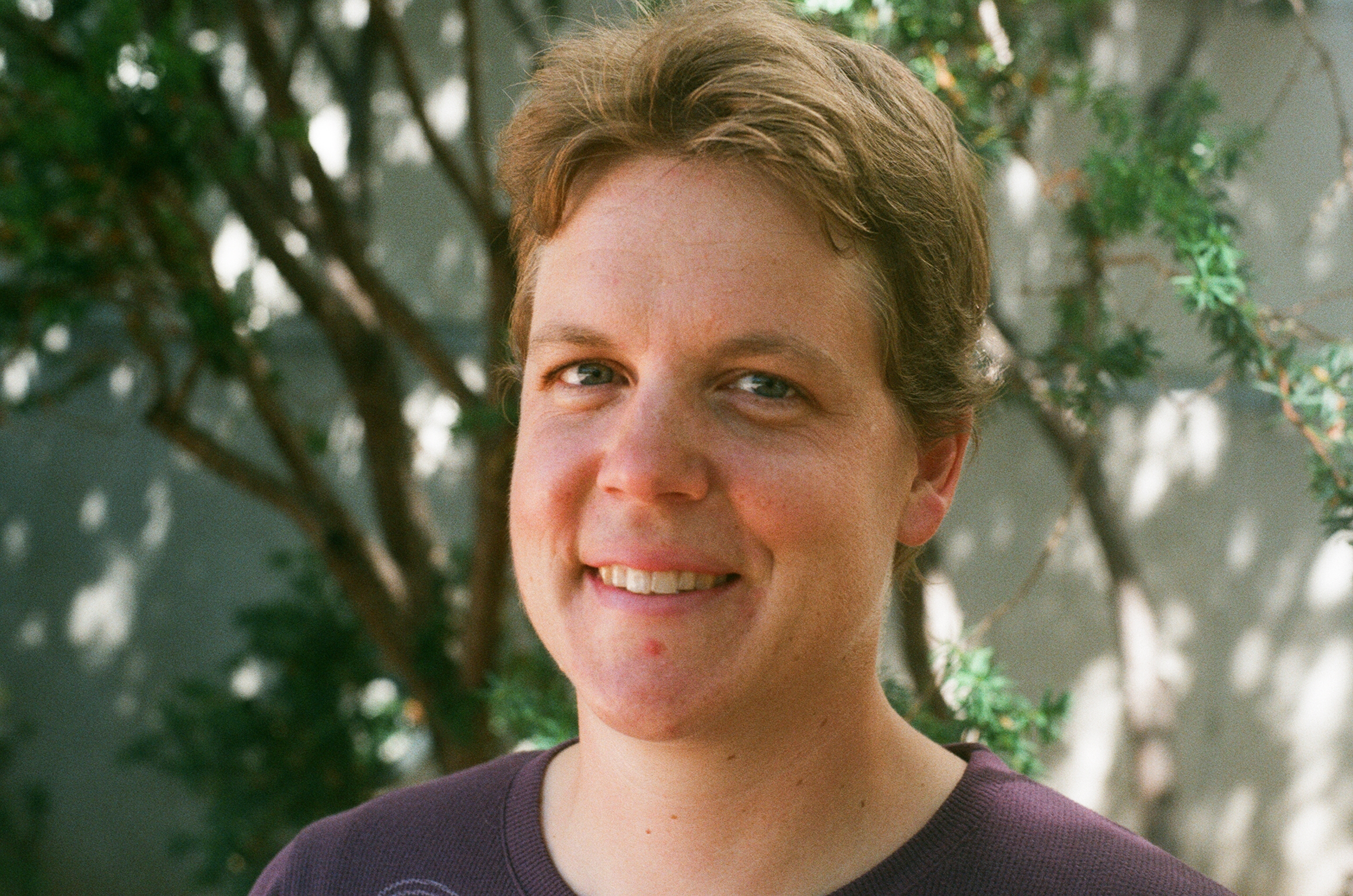
- Wehrheim at Berkeley, California 2013
- Born: 1974 (age 51–52)
- Education: ETH Zürich
- Awards: Fellow of the American Mathematical Society (2012); PECASE (2010)
- Scientific career
- Fields: Mathematics
- Workplaces: Massachusetts Institute of Technology; UC Berkeley
- Thesis: Anti-self-dual instantons with Lagrangian boundary conditions (2002)
- Doctoral advisor: Dusa McDuff; Dietmar Salamon

Katrin Wehrheim (born 1974) is an associate professor of mathematics at the University of California, Berkeley. Wehrheim's research centers around symplectic topology and gauge theory, and they are known for work on pseudoholomorphic quilts. With Dusa McDuff, they have challenged the foundational rigor of a classic proof in symplectic geometry.

== Education and career ==
After attending school in Hamburg and studying at the University of Hamburg until 1995 and Imperial College until 1996, Wehrheim went to ETH Zürich for graduate studies. After almost dropping out to become an Olympic rower, Wehrheim completed their PhD in 2002, under the joint supervision of Dusa McDuff and Dietmar Salamon.

Wehrheim was an instructor at Princeton University and member of the Institute for Advanced Study before taking a tenure track position at the Massachusetts Institute of Technology in 2005. While they were at MIT, Wehrheim—who is openly gay—co-headed the 2008 Celebration of Women in Mathematics conference. Since 2013, Wehrheim has been teaching mathematics at the University of California, Berkeley.

== Awards and honors ==
Wehrheim's PhD thesis in mathematics Anti-Self-Dual Instantons with Lagrangian Boundary Conditions won the 2002 ETH medal. In 2010, Wehrheim received the Presidential Career Award PECASE from Barack Obama in a ceremony at the White House. In 2012, Wehrheim became a fellow of the American Mathematical Society.
