= Canalisation (genetics) =

Measure of the ability of a population to produce the same phenotype

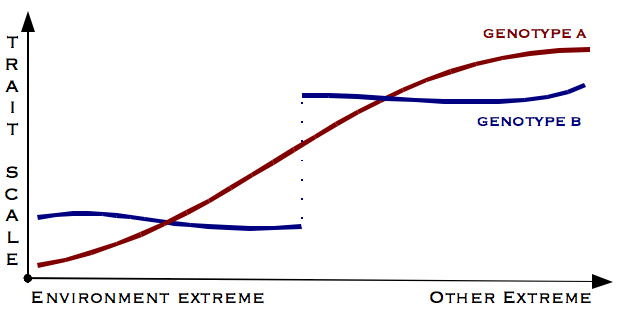
Norms of reaction for two genotypes. Genotype B shows a strongly bimodal distribution indicating differentiation into distinct phenotypes. Each phenotype that results from genotype A is buffered against environmental variation—it is canalised.

Canalisation (also called canalization) is a measure of the ability of a population to produce the same phenotype regardless of variability of its environment or genotype. It is a form of evolutionary robustness. The term was coined in 1942 by C. H. Waddington to capture the fact that "developmental reactions, as they occur in organisms submitted to natural selection... are adjusted so as to bring about one definite end-result regardless of minor variations in conditions during the course of the reaction". He used this word rather than robustness to consider that biological systems are not robust in quite the same way as, for example, engineered systems.

Biological robustness or canalisation comes about when developmental pathways are shaped by evolution. Waddington introduced the concept of the epigenetic landscape, in which the state of an organism rolls "downhill" during development. In this metaphor, a canalised trait is illustrated as a valley (which he called a creode) enclosed by high ridges, safely guiding the phenotype to its "fate". Waddington claimed that canals form in the epigenetic landscape during evolution, and that this heuristic is useful for understanding the unique qualities of biological robustness.

== Genetic assimilation ==
Waddington used the concept of canalisation to explain his experiments on genetic assimilation. In these experiments, he exposed Drosophila pupae to heat shock. This environmental disturbance caused some flies to develop a crossveinless phenotype. He then selected for crossveinless. Eventually, the crossveinless phenotype appeared even without heat shock. Through this process of genetic assimilation, an environmentally induced phenotype had become inherited. Waddington explained this as the formation of a new canal in the epigenetic landscape.

It is, however, possible to explain genetic assimilation using only quantitative genetics and a threshold model, with no reference to the concept of canalisation. However, theoretical models that incorporate a complex genotype–phenotype map have found evidence for the evolution of phenotypic robustness contributing to genetic assimilation, even when selection is only for developmental stability and not for a particular phenotype, and so the quantitative genetics models do not apply. These studies suggest that the canalisation heuristic may still be useful, beyond the more simple concept of robustness.

== Congruence hypothesis ==
Neither canalisation nor robustness are simple quantities to quantify: it is always necessary to specify which trait is canalised (robust) to which perturbations. For example, perturbations can come either from the environment or from mutations. It has been suggested that different perturbations have congruent effects on development taking place on an epigenetic landscape. This could, however, depend on the molecular mechanism responsible for robustness, and be different in different cases.

== Evolutionary capacitance ==
The canalisation metaphor suggests that some phenotypic traits are very robust to small perturbations, for which development does not exit the canal, and rapidly returns down, with little effect on the outcome of development. But perturbations whose magnitude exceeds a certain threshold will break out of the canal, moving the developmental process into uncharted territory. For instance, the study of an allelic series for Fgf8, an important gene for craniofacial development, with decreasing levels of gene expression demonstrated that the phenotype remains canalised as long as the expression level is above 40% of the wild-type expression.

Strong robustness up to a limit, with little robustness beyond, is a pattern that could increase evolvability in a fluctuating environment. Canalisation of a large set of genotypes into a limited phenotypic space has been suggested as a mechanism for the accumulation, in a neutral manner, of mutations that could otherwise be deleterious. Genetic canalisation could allow for evolutionary capacitance, where genetic diversity accumulates in a population over time, sheltered from natural selection because it does not normally affect phenotypes. This hidden diversity could then be unleashed by extreme changes in the environment or by molecular switches, releasing previously cryptic genetic variation that can then contribute to a rapid burst of evolution, a phenomenon termed decanalisation. Cycles of canalization-decanalization could explain the alternating periods of stasis, where genotypic diversity accumulates without morphological changes, followed by rapid morphological changes, where decanalization releases the phenotypic diversity and becomes subject to natural selection, in the fossil record, thus providing a potential developmental explanation for the punctuated equilibrium.

== HSP90 and decanalisation ==
In 1998, Susan Lindquist discovered that Drosophila hsp83 heterozygous mutants exhibit a large diversity of phenotypes (from sexual combs on the head, to scutoid-like and notched wings phenotypes). She showed that these phenotypes could be passed on to the next generation, suggesting a genetic basis for those phenotypes. The authors hypothesized that Hsp90 (the gene mutated in hsp83), as a chaperone protein, plays a pivotal role in the folding and activation of many proteins involved in developmental signaling pathways, thus buffering against genetic variation in those pathways. hsp83 mutants would therefore release the cryptic genetic variation, resulting in a diversity of phenotypes.

In 2002, Lindquist showed that pharmacological inhibition of HSP90 in Arabidopsis thaliana also lead to a wide range of phenotypes, some of which could be considered adaptive, further supporting the canalising role of HSP90.

Finally, the same type of experiment in the cavefish Astyanax mexicanus yielded similar results. This species encompasses two populations: an eyed population living under the water surface and an eye-less blind population living in caves. Not only is the cave population eye-less but it also displays a largely reduced orbit size. HSP90 inhibition leads to an increased variation in orbit size that could explain how this trait could evolve in just a few generations. Further analysis showed that low conductivity in the cave water induces a stress response mimicking the inhibition of HSP90, providing a mechanism for decanalisation.

Interpretation of the original Drosophila paper is now subject to controversy. Molecular analysis of the hsp83 mutant showed that HSP90 is required for piRNA biogenesis, a set of small RNAs repressing transposons in the germline., causing massive transposon insertional mutagenesis that could explain the phenotypic diversification.

== Significance of Variability in Components ==
Understanding variability is an important aspect of comprehending natural selection and mutations. Variability can be classified into two categories: modulating phenotypic variation and modulating the phenotypes that are produced. The presence of this so-called bias in genetic variability allows us to gain further insights into how certain phenotypes are more successful in terms of their actual morphology, biochemical makeup, or behavior. It is scientifically known that organisms need to develop systematically integrated systems in order to thrive in their specific ecosystems. This extends to morphology, where variations must occur in a systematic order; otherwise, phenotypic mutations will not persist due to the occurrence of natural selection. The variation affects the speed and rate of evolutionary change through the selection and modulation of phenotypic variations. Ultimately, this results in a lower amount of diversity observed throughout evolution, as the majority of phenotypes do not persist beyond a few generations due to their inferior morphology, biochemical makeup, or physical movement or appearance.

== See also ==
- Developmental noise
- Phenotypic integration
- Phenotypic plasticity
- Developmental systems theory
- Gene regulatory network
- Systems biology
