= Justin Blanco White =

English architect (1911–2001)

- Born: Margaret Justin Blanco White; 11 December 1911; Kensington, London, England
- Died: 1 November 2001 (aged 89)
- Education: Architectural Association School of Architecture
- Occupation: Architect
- Spouse: Conrad Hal Waddington (m. 1936; died 1975)
- Children: Dusa and Caroline
- Parent(s): G. R. Blanco White and Amber Reeves
- Relatives: Maud Pember Reeves (grandmother); William Pember Reeves (grandfather)

Margaret Justin Blanco White OBE ARIBA (11 December 1911 – 1 November 2001) was an English architect, who lived and worked in Scotland.

== Early life and education ==
Margaret Justin Blanco White was born at 30 Pembroke Square, Kensington, London, on 11 December 1911. Her father was George Rivers Blanco White KC, and her mother was writer Amber Reeves. Her brother was Thomas Blanco White, an intellectual property lawyer. She had an older half sibling Anna-Jane whose father was H.G. Wells. Her maternal grandparents were William Pember Reeves and Maud Pember Reeves.

She was educated at St Paul’s Girls’ School, London between 1926 and 1929.

Blanco White trained at the Architectural Association School of Architecture from 1929, alongside students and close friends Judith Ledeboer, Jessica Albery, and Mary Crowley (later Medd), where they developed a commitment to housing reform and social concerns which impacted their later careers.

== Career ==
Justin Blanco White designed Shawms, Conduit Head Road, Cambridge in 1938. The building was listed Grade II in 1996, and is built in the Modernist style, although using timber as a facing material.

She worked on low cost housing, housing for the elderly, and hospitals when she was Superintending Architect of the Scottish Office.

Also attributed to Blanco White is 12 Landsdowne, Cambridge, built 1961-1968 in collaboration with David Croghan. Commissioned by Pat Merton in 1958, the building was demolished in 2003 according to the condition of sale to its new owners.

In the 1973 Birthday Honours she was appointed an OBE for her work.

== Personal life ==
She married biologist Conrad Hal Waddington in 1936. They had two daughters, Caroline (married name Humphrey, subsequently Dame and Lady Rees, 1943–), an anthropologist, and Dusa (married name McDuff, 1945–), a mathematician.
