= Dietmar Salamon =

German mathematician (1953–2025)

- Born: 7 March 1953; Bremen, West Germany
- Died: 4 November 2025 (aged 72)
- Education: Leibniz University Hannover; University of Bremen
- Awards: Fellow of the American Mathematical Society (2012); Leroy P. Steele Prize (2017)
- Scientific career
- Fields: Symplectic topology
- Workplaces: ETH Zurich; University of Warwick
- Thesis: On control and observation of neutral systems (1982)

Dietmar Arno Salamon (7 March 1953 – 4 November 2025) was a German mathematician.

== Life and career ==
Salamon studied mathematics at the Leibniz University Hannover. In 1982, he earned his doctorate at the University of Bremen with dissertation On control and observation of neutral systems. He subsequently spent two years as a postdoctoral fellow at the Mathematical Research Center at the University of Wisconsin–Madison, followed by one year at the Mathematical Research Institute at ETH Zurich. In 1986, he became a lecturer at the University of Warwick, where he was appointed full professor in 1994. The summer semester 1988 he spent as a visiting professor at the University of Bremen and the winter semester 1991 at the University of Wisconsin-Madison. From 1998 to 2018, he was a full professor of mathematics at ETH Zurich, retiring as professor emeritus in 2018.

Salamon's field of research is symplectic topology and related fields such as symplectic geometry. Symplectic topology is a relatively new field of mathematics that developed into an important branch of mathematics in the 1990s. Some important new techniques are Gromov's pseudoholomorphic curves, Floer homology, and Seiberg-Witten invariants on four-dimensional manifolds.

In 1994, he was an Invited Speaker with talk Lagrangian intersections, 3-manifolds with boundary and the Atiyah-Floer conjecture at the International Congress of Mathematicians (ICM) in Zurich. In 2012, he was elected a Fellow of the American Mathematical Society. In 2017, he received, with Dusa McDuff, the AMS Leroy P. Steele Prize for Mathematical Exposition for the book J-holomorphic curves and symplectic topology, which they co-authored. He was a member of Academia Europaea from 2011 until his death on 4 November 2025, at the age of 72.

== Selected publications ==
=== Books ===
- Dietmar Salamon: Funktionentheorie. Birkhauser, 2011.
- Dusa McDuff, Dietmar Salamon: J-holomorphic curves and symplectic topology. American Mathematical Society, 2004, 2nd edition 2012.
- Dusa McDuff, Dietmar Salamon: Introduction to symplectic topology. Oxford University Press, 1998.
- Dusa McDuff: $J$-holomorphic curves and quantum cohomology. American Mathematical Soc. 1994. ISBN 978-0-8218-0332-5.

=== Articles ===
- Dietmar Salamon: Symplectic Geometry. Cambridge University Press, 1994 (London Mathematical Society Lecture Notes), ISBN 0-521-44699-6.
- Helmut Hofer, Dietmar Salamon: Floer homology and Novikov rings. The Floer memorial volume, 483–524, Progr. Math., 133, Birkhäuser, Basel, 1995. (proof of the Arnold conjecture for $c_1\mid_{\pi_2M}=0$) doi:10.1007/978-3-0348-9217-9_20
- Andreas Floer, Helmut Hofer, Dietmar Salamon: Transversality in elliptic Morse theory for the symplectic action. Duke Math. J. 80 (1995), no. 1, 251–292.
- Joel Robbin, Dietmar Salamon: The spectral flow and the Maslov index. Bull. London Math. Soc. 27 (1995), no. 1, 1–33.
- Stamatis Dostoglou, Dietmar Salamon: Self-dual instantons and holomorphic curves. Ann. of Math. (2) 139 (1994), no. 3, 581–640. doi:10.2307/2118573
- Joel Robbin, Dietmar Salamon: The Maslov index for paths. Topology 32 (1993), no. 4, 827–844.
- Dietmar Salamon, Eduard Zehnder: Morse theory for periodic solutions of Hamiltonian systems and the Maslov index. Comm. Pure Appl. Math. 45 (1992), no. 10, 1303–1360. doi:10.1002/cpa.3160451004
- Dietmar Salamon: Infinite-dimensional linear systems with unbounded control and observation: a functional analytic approach. Trans. Amer. Math. Soc. 300 (1987), no. 2, 383–431. doi:10.1090/S0002-9947-1987-0876460-7
