= Centre for Human Ecology =

Scottish research institute

The Centre for Human Ecology is an independent academic institute based in Glasgow, Scotland. It was founded in 1972 by Conrad Hal Waddington at the University of Edinburgh.
