= Baldwin effect =

Effect of learned behavior on evolution

The Baldwin effect compared to Lamarck's theory of evolution, Darwinian evolution, and Waddington's genetic assimilation. All the theories offer explanations of how organisms respond to a changed environment with adaptive inherited change.

In evolutionary biology, what is now called the Baldwin effect describes the ways agency, imitation and learned behaviour can pioneer evolutionary change. It was first christened as such in the 1950s by George Gaylord Simpson, one of the architects of the modern synthesis, to bring attention to a process highlighted in the previous century by James Mark Baldwin.

Inspired to challenge late Victorian neo-darwinism by Darwin's own use of his theory of natural selection (in On the Origin of Species) to reframe the laws of use and disuse in terms of transitional habits—giving several examples of the ways different organisms' change of habits, as in flying squirrels and flightless beetles, have altered the subsequent evolutionary fates of their anatomy—Baldwin and others re-emphasised that an organism's ability to learn new behaviours (e.g., to colonise new habitat or acclimatise to a new stressor) may affect its reproductive success and may, therefore, subsequently affect the genetic makeup of its species through natural selection, if supported by heritable traits. The Baldwin effect posits that, if such new habits prove advantageous, subsequent selection will reinforce those habits and any other structures they affect so that they will become instinctive or in-born over many generations. This process may appear similar to non-Darwinian Lamarckism, a view which proposes that living things may directly inherit their parents' acquired characteristics. But, in contrast to Lamarck, and echoing Darwin's argument about transitional habits in On the Origin of Species, Baldwin proposed that, only if supportable by heritable traits, can changed behaviour lead to adaptive evolutionary change.

The Baldwin effect has been independently proposed several times. It is generally recognized by proponents of the modern synthesis. And it has become a central plank of 21st century evolutionary biology which challenges the 20th century's modern synthesis by retheorizing the leading role played by organisms' agency in the origin of species (see Extended Evolutionary Synthesis).

== "A New Factor in Evolution" ==
By highlighting the Baldwin effect when he did, Simpson invited evolutionary biologists to reconsider the earlier claim made by Julian Huxley and others that, viewed through the prism of the modern synthesis, Darwin’s theory denied any role for the “purposiveness of organic structure” in the evolution of adaptations (most famously in Evolution: The Modern Synthesis). Baldwin’s 1896 paper "A New Factor in Evolution" had christened the 'new factor' Organic Selection, a label which became the title of his second paper on the topic published in 1897. These two papers specified three ways in which an organism might through its own changes become adaptively modified during its life-history: bodily or ‘physico-genetically’, neurally or ‘neuro-genetically’, and through 'conscious agency' or ‘psycho-genetically’. As the historian of science Robert Richards put it in 1987:

If animals entered a new environment—or their old environment rapidly changed—those that could flexibly respond by learning new behaviours or by ontogenetically adapting would be naturally preserved. This saved remnant would, over several generations, have the opportunity to exhibit spontaneously congenital variations similar to their acquired traits and have these variations naturally selected. It would look as though the acquired traits had sunk into the hereditary substance in a Lamarckian fashion, but the process would really be neo-Darwinian.

Selected offspring would tend to have an increased capacity for developing new skills. The Baldwin effect thus places emphasis on the fact that the sustained behaviour of a species or group can shape the evolution of that species, often being understood in evolutionary developmental biology as a scenario in which a character or trait change occurring in an organism as a result of its interaction with its environment becomes gradually assimilated into its developmental genetic or epigenetic repertoire. In the words of the philosopher of science Daniel Dennett:

Thanks to the Baldwin effect, species can be said to pretest the efficacy of particular different designs by phenotypic (individual) exploration of the space of nearby possibilities. If a particularly winning setting is thereby discovered, this discovery will create a new selection pressure: organisms that are closer in the adaptive landscape to that discovery will have a clear advantage over those more distant.

An update to the Baldwin effect was developed by Jean Piaget, Paul Weiss, and Conrad Waddington in the 1960s–1970s. This new version included an explicit role for the social in shaping subsequent natural change in humans (both evolutionary and developmental), with reference to alterations of selection pressures.

More recently, lack of familiarity with Darwin's exposition of transitional habits in his 1859 book On the Origin of Species has led some scientists to claim that, in 1873, Douglas Spalding was the first to identify the process now known as the Baldwin effect, as discussed by Baldwin in 1896.

== Controversy and acceptance ==
Initially Baldwin's ideas were not incompatible with the prevailing, but uncertain, ideas about the mechanism of transmission of hereditary information and at least two other biologists put forward very similar ideas in 1896. In 1901, Maurice Maeterlinck referred to behavioural adaptations to prevailing climates in different species of bees as "what had merely been an idea, therefore, and opposed to instinct, has thus by slow degrees become an instinctive habit". The Baldwin effect theory subsequently became more controversial, with scholars divided between "Baldwin boosters" and "Baldwin skeptics". The theory was first called the "Baldwin effect" by George Gaylord Simpson in 1953. Simpson "admitted that the idea was theoretically consistent, that is, not inconsistent with the modern synthesis", but he doubted that the phenomenon occurred very often, or if so, could be proven to occur. In his discussion of the reception of the Baldwin-effect theory Simpson points out that the theory appears to provide a reconciliation between a neo-Darwinian and a neo-Lamarckian approach and that "Mendelism and later genetic theory so conclusively ruled out the extreme neo-Lamarckian position that reconciliation came to seem unnecessary". In 1942, the evolutionary biologist Julian Huxley promoted the Baldwin effect as part of the modern synthesis, saying the concept had been unduly neglected by evolutionists.

In the 1960s, the evolutionary biologist Ernst Mayr contended that the Baldwin effect theory was untenable because

1. the argument is stated in terms of the individual genotype, whereas what is really exposed to the selection pressure is a phenotypically and genetically variable population;
2. it is not sufficiently emphasized that the degree of modification of the phenotype is in itself genetically controlled;
3. it is assumed that phenotypic rigidity is selectively superior to phenotypic flexibility.

In 1987 Geoffrey Hinton and Steven Nowlan demonstrated by computer simulation that learning can accelerate evolution, and they associated this with the Baldwin effect.

Paul Griffiths suggests two reasons for the continuing interest in the Baldwin effect. The first is the role mind is understood to play in the effect. The second is the connection between development and evolution in the effect. Baldwin's account of how neurophysiological and conscious mental factors may contribute to the effect brings into focus the question of the possible survival value of consciousness.

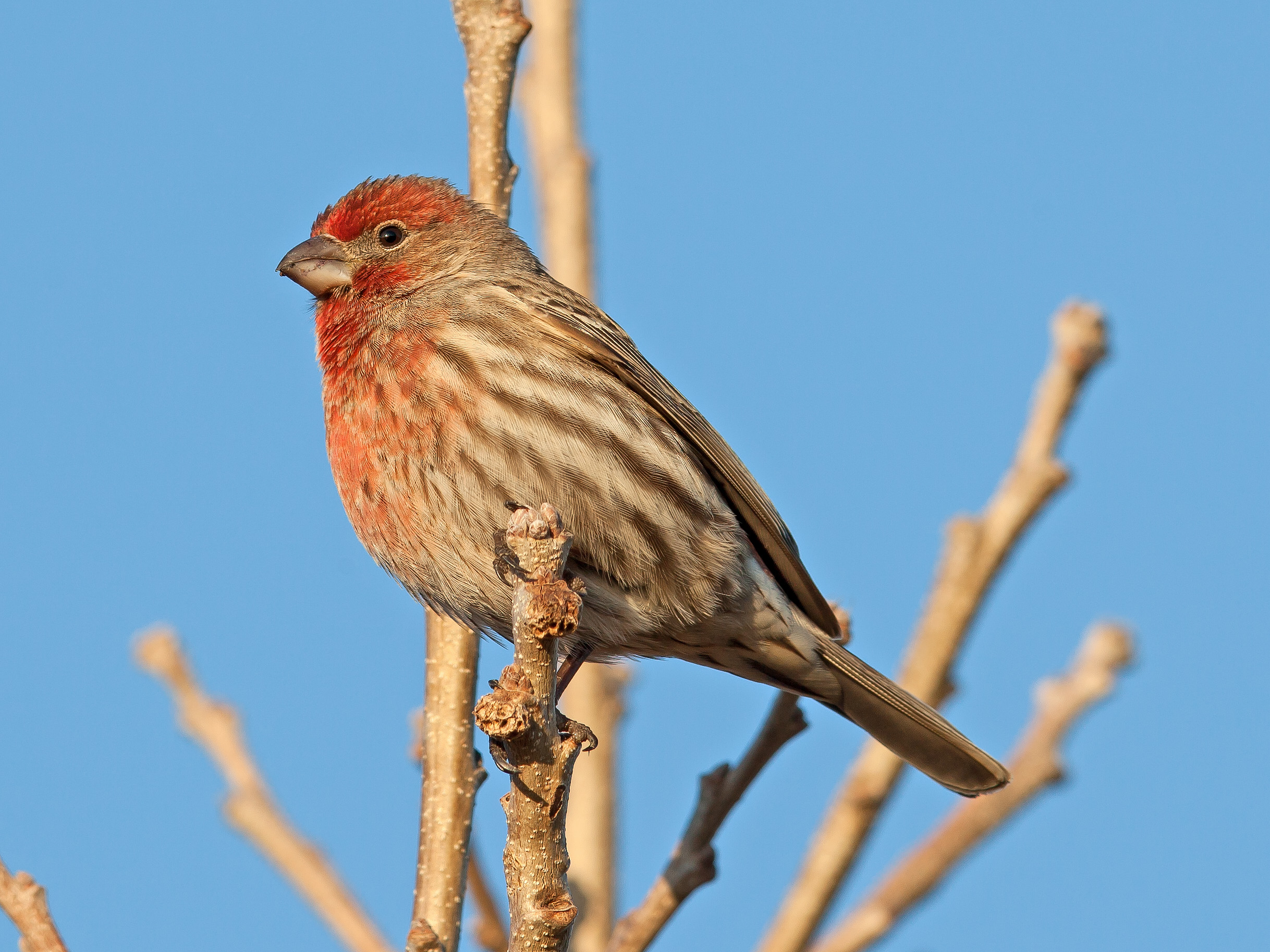
The house finch's colonisation of North America has provided empirical evidence of the Baldwin effect.

Still, David Depew observed in 2003, "it is striking that a rather diverse lot of contemporary evolutionary theorists, most of whom regard themselves as supporters of the Modern Synthesis, have of late become 'Baldwin boosters'". These

are typically evolutionary psychologistw who are searching for scenarios in which a population can get itself by behavioral trial and error onto a "hard to find" part of the fitness landscape in which human brain, language, and mind can rapidly coevolve. They are searching for what Daniel Dennett, himself a Baldwin booster, calls an "evolutionary crane," an instrument to do some heavy lifting fast.

According to Dennett, also in 2003, recent work has rendered the Baldwin effect "no longer a controversial wrinkle in orthodox Darwinism". Potential genetic mechanisms underlying the Baldwin effect have been proposed for the evolution of natural (genetically determinant) antibodies. In 2009, empirical evidence for the Baldwin effect was provided from the colonisation of North America by the house finch.

The Baldwin effect has been incorporated into the extended evolutionary synthesis.

== Comparison with genetic assimilation ==
The Baldwin effect has been confused with, and sometimes conflated with, a different evolutionary theory also based on phenotypic plasticity, C. H. Waddington's genetic assimilation. The Baldwin effect includes genetic accommodation, of which one type is genetic assimilation. Science historian Laurent Loison has written that "the Baldwin effect and genetic assimilation, even if they are quite close, should not be conflated".

== See also ==
- Evolvability – Capacity of a system for adaptive evolution
- Maternal effect – Influence of mother's environment and genotype on offspring's phenotype
- Meme – Cultural idea that spreads through imitation
- Pangenesis – Darwin's proposed mechanism for heredity
- Weismann barrier – Distinction between germ cell lineages producing gametes and somatic cells
