= Amber Reeves =

British novelist and teacher

- Amber Reeves, with Anna-Jane, her daughter with H. G. Wells (1910)
- Born: 1 July 1887; Christchurch, New Zealand
- Died: 26 December 1981 (aged 94); St John's Wood, London, England
- Education: Newnham College, Cambridge
- Spouse: George Blanco White (m. 1909; died 1966)
- Children: 3, including Thomas and Justin
- Parent(s): Maud Pember Reeves and William Pember Reeves
- Relatives: Dusa McDuff (granddaughter); Caroline Humphrey (granddaughter); Conrad Waddington (son-in-law)
- Writing career
- Subject: Feminism

Amber Blanco White (née Reeves; 1 July 1887 – 26 December 1981) was a New Zealand–born British feminist writer and scholar.

== Early life ==
Reeves was born in Christchurch, New Zealand, the eldest of three children of Fabian feminist Maud Pember Reeves (née Robison; 1865–1953) and New Zealand politician and social reformer William Pember Reeves.

The family moved to London in 1896, where her father became New Zealand's Agent-General. Her own widowed aunt, cousins, and servants joined the household in Cornwall Gardens, Kensington. "London was hateful after New Zealand," she said. "No freedom. No seashore. Streets, streets, streets. Houses, houses."

Reeves attended Kensington High School until 1904, and then travelled to Europe to become fluent in French. Her own father was not fully converted to the higher education of women; when he gave her the choice between being presented at court and going to the University of Cambridge, she chose Cambridge. Reeves then began studying Moral Sciences (philosophy) at Newnham College in 1905. It is unlikely her father raised further opposition as he always spoke highly of her academic achievements.

== University of Cambridge ==
While at Cambridge Reeves began to associate with other young women who shared her intellectual enthusiasms and socialist political leanings, forming a lifelong friendship with Eva Spielmann (later Eva Hubback), who became an educationalist. She became involved in a number of societies, including the debating society. In 1907, she led the inter-collegiate debate with Girton, arguing that "the socialist conception of life is the most noble and the most fruitful, both for the state and the individual."

In 1906, she founded the Cambridge University Fabian Society (CUFS) with Ben Keeling, a member of the (somewhat inactive) existing Fabian society in the town. CUFS was the first society at Cambridge to enlist women from its founding. Young women met regularly with men as equals and discussed everything from religious beliefs to social evils to sex, which would have been impossible in the conventional atmospheres of their homes.

She excelled in her studies, taking a double first in 1908. Gilbert Murray once wrote of an address she had given to the Newnham Philosophical Society, "It seems to me quite the best college paper that I have read—I mean as treated by a young person and from a non-metaphysical point of view." A fellow student described her as "intellect personified" after a lecture she gave to the Philosophical Society.

== Relationship with H. G. Wells ==
H. G. Wells had been a friend of Reeves' parents and one of the most popular speakers to address the CUFS. After Reeves' address to the Philosophical Society it was rumoured that she and Wells, one of the most prominent and prolific writers of the first half of the twentieth century, had gone to Paris for a weekend. Their appearance together at a supper party thrown for fellow Fabian and Governor of Jamaica Sir Sydney Olivier, 1st Baron Olivier was the first open declaration of the romantic relationship between the pair. Wells claimed that Reeves responded to his taste for adventurous eroticism, and the "sexual imaginativess" that his wife Jane could not cope with. Wells maintained that their relationship be kept silent, though Reeves saw no reason why their exciting affair be kept a secret. Once their relationship became well known, there were numerous attempts to break it up, particularly from Amber's mother and from George Rivers Blanco White, a lawyer who would later marry her.

Reeves was anxious not to break up Wells's marriage, though she wanted to have his child. The news that she was pregnant in the spring of 1909 shocked the Reeves family, and the couple fled to Le Touquet-Paris-Plage where they rented a house together. Whilst there, Wells sold his family home in Sandgate and bought a new house for his wife and two sons in London. Considerable social pressure on both sides mounted for them to stop seeing each other. Unhappy in France, after three months they decided to leave Le Touquet. On 7 May 1909, she married Rivers Blanco White. Despite the marriage, Reeves and Wells carried on seeing each other, much to the consternation of everyone else. Due to social pressure, the affair finally ended by the spring of 1910. In her later life she wrote, "I did not arrange to marry Rivers; he arranged it with H.G, but I have always thought it the best that could possibly have happened."

Wells wrote the roman à clef Ann Veronica based on his relationship with Reeves. The novel was rejected by his publisher, Frederick Macmillan, because of the possible damage it would do; however, T. Fisher Unwin published it in the autumn of 1909, when gossip concerning Wells was rampant. Wells later wrote that while the character of Ann Veronica was based on Amber, the character he believed came closest to her was Amanda in his novel The Research Magnificent. On 31 December 1909, she bore a daughter, Anna-Jane, who did not learn that her real father was H. G. Wells until she was 18.

== Work and family life ==
Reeves was employed by the Ministry of Labour, in charge of a section that dealt with the employment of women. Part of her job was encouraging workers and employers to see that women were capable of a much wider range of tasks than was usually expected. She later took responsibility for women's wages at the Ministry of Munitions. In 1919, she was appointed to the Whitley Council, but in that same year her appointment was terminated. Humbert Wolfe, a public servant, wrote to Matthew Nathan, the secretary of the council, pointing out that Amber's termination was chiefly on the grounds that she was a married woman, and that letting her go from the public service was "really stupid".

By 1921, her vigour in the women workers' cause had led her to come up against ex-servicemen who exercised considerable power through their associations. She was told a deputation of MPs had approached the minister and claimed that no ex-serviceman could sleep in peace while she remained in the civil service. She received a dismissal notice and, aside from time with the Ministry of Labour in 1922, that was the end of her civil service career. She began to work on her book Give and Take, which was published in 1923. Amber did not take well to being a housewife; at one point she wrote:

The life of washing up dishes in little separate houses and being necessarily subordinate in everything to the wage-earning man is I think very destructive to the women and to any opinion they may influence. It is humiliating and narrowing and there is nothing to be said in its favour... ...Oh how I should like some hard work again that brought one up against outside life.

There was some strain in her marriage with George Rivers Blanco White. In their youth they had both adopted positive attitudes toward the free expression of love that were common in the literary, intellectual and left-wing society at the time, but as they grew older these attitudes were beginning to change. Writing of marriage in her book Worry in Women, she stated that if people choose to break ethical codes, they had to be prepared to cope with guilt. She also stated that if a wife was unfaithful, she should not tell her husband, writing, "if ever there is a case for a downright lie, this is it."

In addition to Anna-Jane, Reeves had two children, Thomas, a patent lawyer, and (Margaret) Justin Blanco White, an architect. Justin married the biologist Conrad Hal Waddington, and had two daughters, mathematician Dusa McDuff and anthropologist Caroline Humphrey.

== Writings ==
Reeves published four novels and four non-fiction works, dealing with a variety of subjects, but all sharing a common socialist and feminist critique of capitalist society. These are:

- The Reward of Virtue (1911)
- A Lady and her Husband (1914)
- Helen in Love (1916)
- Give and Take: A Novel of Intrigue (1923)
- The Nationalisation of Banking (1934)
- The New Propaganda (1938)
- Worry in Women (1941)
- Ethics for Unbelievers (1949)

She also wrote book reviews for Queen and Vogue, as well as articles for the Saturday Review. For some time she was the editor of the Townswomen's Guild paper Townswoman.

Reeves collaborated with Wells on The Work, Wealth and Happiness of Mankind (1931). In this book, she researched and put together material on the devastation of the rubber trade on the native populations of Putumayo Department, Peru, and Belgian Congo (see the Casement Report for an account of the tremendous human rights abuses in the latter). She also contributed to a section on how wealth is accumulated by supplying case histories of new powers and forces "running wild and crazy in a last frenzy for private and personal gain". The chapter "The Role of Women in the World's Work" was included by Wells at Amber's suggestion, though after reading the chapter she asked him to include a disclaimer that she did not necessarily agree with what he said.

== Political career ==
During the 1924 election campaign, Reeves was asked to speak on behalf of both the Liberal and Labour Party candidates. She choose to support Labour: "The Liberal audiences were nice narrow decent people. They sat upright in rows and clapped their cotton gloves... But when I got to the Labour meetings in the slums, among the costers and the railway men and the women in tenth hand velvet hats—when I saw their pinched grey-and-yellow faces in those steamy halls, I knew all of a sudden that they were my people." She soon became a member of the party and supported her husband as the Labour Party candidate for Holland-with-Boston in Lincolnshire. The seat had gone to the Liberals in a by-election earlier that year and White failed to win it back.

Reeves attempted to get her theories on currency, later brought together in her book The Nationalisation of Banking, adopted by the Labour Party, and she and Rivers became responsible for a party publication called Womens Leader. Reeves remained active in the Fabian Society, and by this time many Fabians agreed that there was a need to work through the parliamentary Labour Party. She stood twice as a candidate for Hendon, in 1931 and 1935.

== Teaching ==
For some time Reeves taught at Morley College in London. Initially invited by her friend from Cambridge Eva Hubback to help out, she became part of a team of lecturers in 1928, giving twice weekly classes on ethics and psychology. In 1929, the year after the passing of the Equal Franchise Act which gave women the vote on the same terms as men, she was billed by the Fabian Society to lecture on "The New Woman Voters and the Coming Election". However, she withdrew from this lecture to work on a by-election campaign for her husband in Holland-with-Boston. She lectured at Morley for thirty-seven years, regularly revising her courses to incorporate an increased body of psychological thought. In 1946, she became acting principal after Hubback's death. When a new principal was appointed in 1947 she returned to lecturing and writing her book Ethics for Unbelievers.

== Later life ==
In July 1960, Rivers suffered a stroke which left him paralysed down his right side. Reeves was distraught and during the last years of his life she worried a lot and became depressed. She wrote to her daughter Anna-Jane, who was in Singapore at the time, "If there is a Confucian temple in K.L., you might make a little offering (if he does like offerings)... ...I have more faith in him now than in our own deity who seems to be letting us down all round." When Rivers died on 28 March 1966, Reeves was determined to keep living as normally as possible. She was visited by New Zealand historian Keith Sinclair who was writing a biography of her father, and twice by interviewers from the BBC (a 40-minute interview with Denys Gueroult was broadcast by Radio 4 in September 1970). Although she enjoyed discussing politics and world affairs, she felt disillusioned about the socialist hopes of her youth, and supported the Conservatives in the 1970 election. She believed that the wrong people were leading the left and that only diehards would vote for them.

In December 1981, she was admitted to a hospital in St John's Wood and died on 26 December aged 94.
