= GalGael Trust =

GalGael Trust is a community and heritage association located in Govan, Glasgow, Scotland, near the River Clyde. It works with recovering drug addicts and alcoholics, people suffering from mental-health problems and the long-term unemployed. According to a volunteer, "GalGael gives you the opportunity to open up a wee bit without all the pressure".

The trust is best known for building and sailing wooden boats in celebration of Scotland's heritage.

== Origins ==
GalGael was founded in the mid-1990s by Gehan and Colin Macleod, following the protests against the building of the M77 through Pollok Country Park.

The phrase "GalGael" comes from 9th-century Norsemen, who mingled with native Celts; gall meant "foreigner", and gael meant "native".

== Boat building ==
Trees blown down in a storm were collected for carving and boat building. GalGael built first a model of a birlinn and then a 30 foot long boat called Orcuan. The birlinn was launched on the Clyde by the Deputy Social Justice Minister for Scotland and then sailed to the island of Eigg. The following year the Orcuan sailed to Ireland.

== Other projects ==
GalGael is also involved with the restoration of Barmaddy Farm in Argyll.
