= Genetic assimilation =

Mechanism which genetically encodes phenotypes through evolutionary processes

Genetic assimilation is a process described by Conrad H. Waddington by which a phenotype originally produced in response to an environmental condition, such as exposure to a teratogen, later becomes genetically encoded via artificial selection or natural selection. Despite superficial appearances, this does not require the (Lamarckian) inheritance of acquired characters, although epigenetic inheritance could potentially influence the result. Waddington stated that genetic assimilation overcomes the barrier to selection imposed by what he called canalization of developmental pathways; he supposed that the organism's genetics evolved to ensure that development proceeded in a certain way regardless of normal environmental variations.

The classic example of genetic assimilation was a pair of experiments in 1942 and 1953 by Waddington. He exposed Drosophila fruit fly embryos to ether, producing an extreme change in their phenotype: they developed a double thorax, resembling the effect of the bithorax gene. This is called a homeotic change. Flies which developed halteres (the modified hindwings of true flies, used for balance) with wing-like characteristics were chosen for breeding for 20 generations, by which point the phenotype could be seen without other treatment.

Waddington's explanation has been controversial, and has been accused of being Lamarckian. More recent evidence appears to confirm the existence of genetic assimilation in evolution; in yeast, when a stop codon is lost by mutation, the reading frame is preserved much more often than would be expected. Genetic assimilation has been incorporated into the extended evolutionary synthesis.

== History ==
=== Waddington's experiments ===
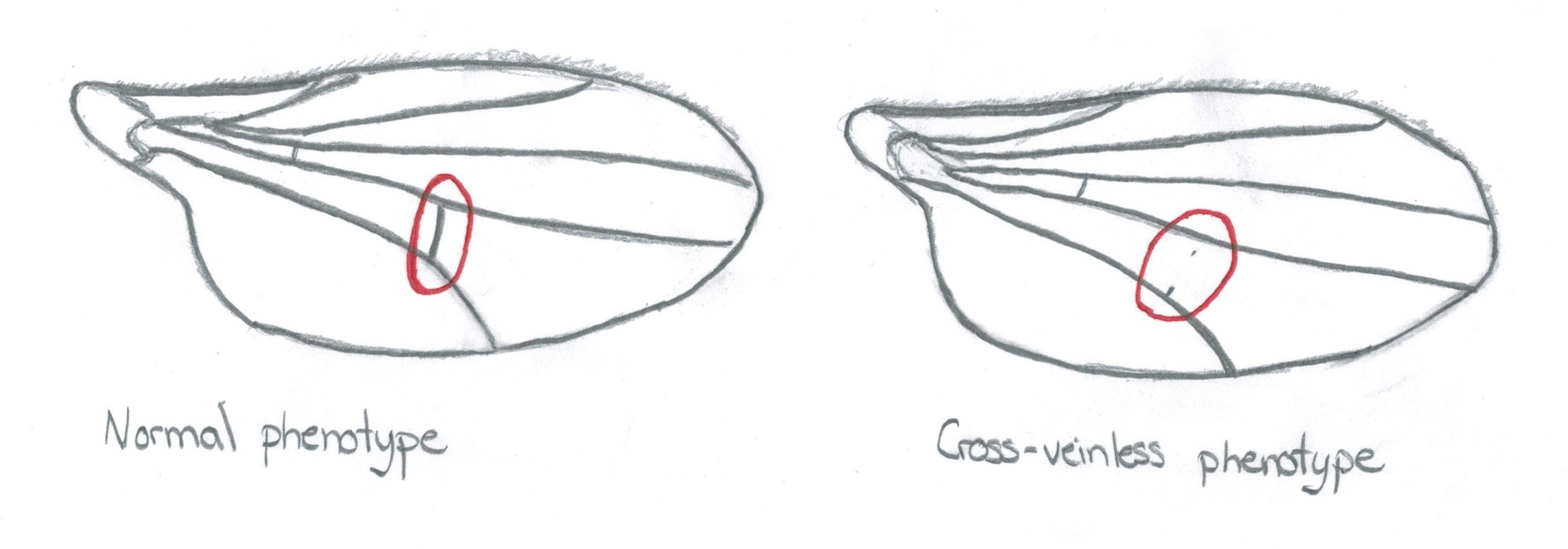
Normal and cross-veinless Drosophila wings

Conrad H. Waddington's classic experiment (1942) induced an extreme environmental reaction in the developing embryos of Drosophila. In response to ether vapor, a proportion of embryos developed a radical phenotypic change, a second thorax. At this point in the experiment bithorax is not innate; it is induced by an unusual environment. Waddington then repeatedly selected Drosophila for the bithorax phenotype over some 20 generations. After this time, some Drosophila developed bithorax without the ether treatment.

Waddington carried out a similar experiment in 1953, this time inducing the cross-veinless phenocopy in Drosophila with a heat shock, with 40% of the flies showing the phenotype prior to selection. Again he selected for the phenotype over several generations, applying heat shock each time, and eventually the phenotype appeared even without heat shock.

=== Waddington's explanation ===
Waddington called the effect he had seen "genetic assimilation". His explanation was that it was caused by a process he called "canalization". He compared embryonic development to a ball rolling down a slope in what he called an epigenetic landscape, where each point on the landscape is a possible state of the organism (involving many variables). As a particular pathway becomes entrenched or "canalized", it becomes more stable, likely to occur even in the face of environmental changes. Major perturbations such as ether or heat shock eject the developmental pathway from the metaphorical canal, exploring other parts of the epigenetic landscape. Selection in the presence of that perturbation leads to the evolution of a new canal; after the perturbation is discontinued, developmental trajectories continue to follow the canalized pathway.

=== A Darwinian explanation ===
Other evolutionary biologists have agreed that assimilation occurs, but give a different, purely quantitative genetics explanation in terms of Darwin's natural or artificial selection. The phenotype, say cross-veinless, is presumed to be caused by a combination of multiple genes. The phenotype appears when the sum of gene effects exceeds a threshold; if that threshold is lowered by a perturbation, say a heat shock, the phenotype is more likely to be seen. Continued selection under perturbing conditions increases the frequency of the alleles of genes that promote the phenotype until the threshold is breached, and the phenotype appears without requiring the heat shock.

Perturbations can be genetic or epigenetic rather than environmental. For example, Drosophila fruit flies have a heat shock protein, Hsp90, which protects the development of many structures in the adult fly from heat shock. If the protein is damaged by a mutation, then just as if it were damaged by the environmental effects of drugs, many different phenotypic variants appear; if these are selected for, they quickly establish without further need for the mutant Hsp90.

=== A mutational explanation ===
In 2017, L. Fanti and colleagues replicated Waddington's experiments, but included DNA sequencing, revealing that the wing phenotypes were due to mutational events, small deletions and the insertions of transposable elements that were mobilised by the heat exposure.

== Neo-Darwinism or Lamarckism ==
Waddington's genetic assimilation compared to Lamarckism, Darwinian evolution, and the Baldwin effect. All the theories offer explanations of how organisms respond to a changed environment with adaptive inherited change.

Waddington's theory of genetic assimilation was controversial. The evolutionary biologists Theodosius Dobzhansky and Ernst Mayr both thought that Waddington was using genetic assimilation to support so-called Lamarckian inheritance. They denied that the inheritance of acquired characteristics had taken place, and asserted that Waddington had simply observed the natural selection of genetic variants that already existed in the study population. Waddington himself interpreted his results in a Neo-Darwinian way, particularly emphasizing that they "could bring little comfort to those who wish to believe that environmental influences tend to produce heritable changes in the direction of adaptation." The evolutionary developmental biologist Adam S. Wilkins wrote that "[Waddington] in his lifetime... was widely perceived primarily as a critic of Neo-Darwinian evolutionary theory. His criticisms ... were focused on what he saw as unrealistic, 'atomistic' models of both gene selection and trait evolution." In particular, according to Wilkins, Waddington felt that the Neo-Darwinians badly neglected the phenomenon of extensive gene interactions and that the 'randomness' of mutational effects, posited in the theory, was false. Even though Waddington became critical of the neo-Darwinian synthetic theory of evolution, he still described himself as a Darwinian, and called for an extended evolutionary synthesis based on his research. Waddington did not deny the threshold-based conventional genetic interpretation of his experiments, but regarded it "as a told to the children version of what I wished to say" and considered the debate to be about "mode of expression, rather than of substance". Both genetic assimilation and the related Baldwin effect are theories of phenotypic plasticity, where aspects of an organism's physiology and behaviour are affected by the environment. The evolutionary ecologist Erika Crispo states that they differ in that genetic assimilation decreases the level of plasticity (returning to Waddington's original definition of canalization; whereas the Baldwin effect may increase it) but does not change the mean phenotypic value (where the Baldwin effect changes it). Crispo defines genetic assimilation as a kind of genetic accommodation, "evolution in response to both genetically based and environmentally induced novel traits", which in turn is in her view central to the Baldwin effect.

== Relationship to adaptation ==
Mathematical modeling suggests that under certain circumstances, natural selection favours the evolution of canalization that is designed to fail under extreme conditions. If the result of such a failure is favoured by natural selection, genetic assimilation occurs. In the 1960s, Waddington and his colleague the animal geneticist J. M. Rendel argued for the importance of genetic assimilation in natural adaptation, as a means of providing new and potentially beneficial variation to populations under stress, enabling them to evolve rapidly. Their contemporary George C. Williams argued that genetic assimilation proceeds at the cost of a loss of previously adaptive developmental plasticity, and therefore should be seen as resulting in a net loss rather than gain of complexity, making it in his view uninteresting from the perspective of the constructive process of adaptation. However, the preceding phenotypic plasticity need not be adaptive, but simply represent a breakdown of canalization.

A 2023 transcriptomic analysis revealed that genetic assimilation in environmental adaptations is rare.

== In natural populations ==
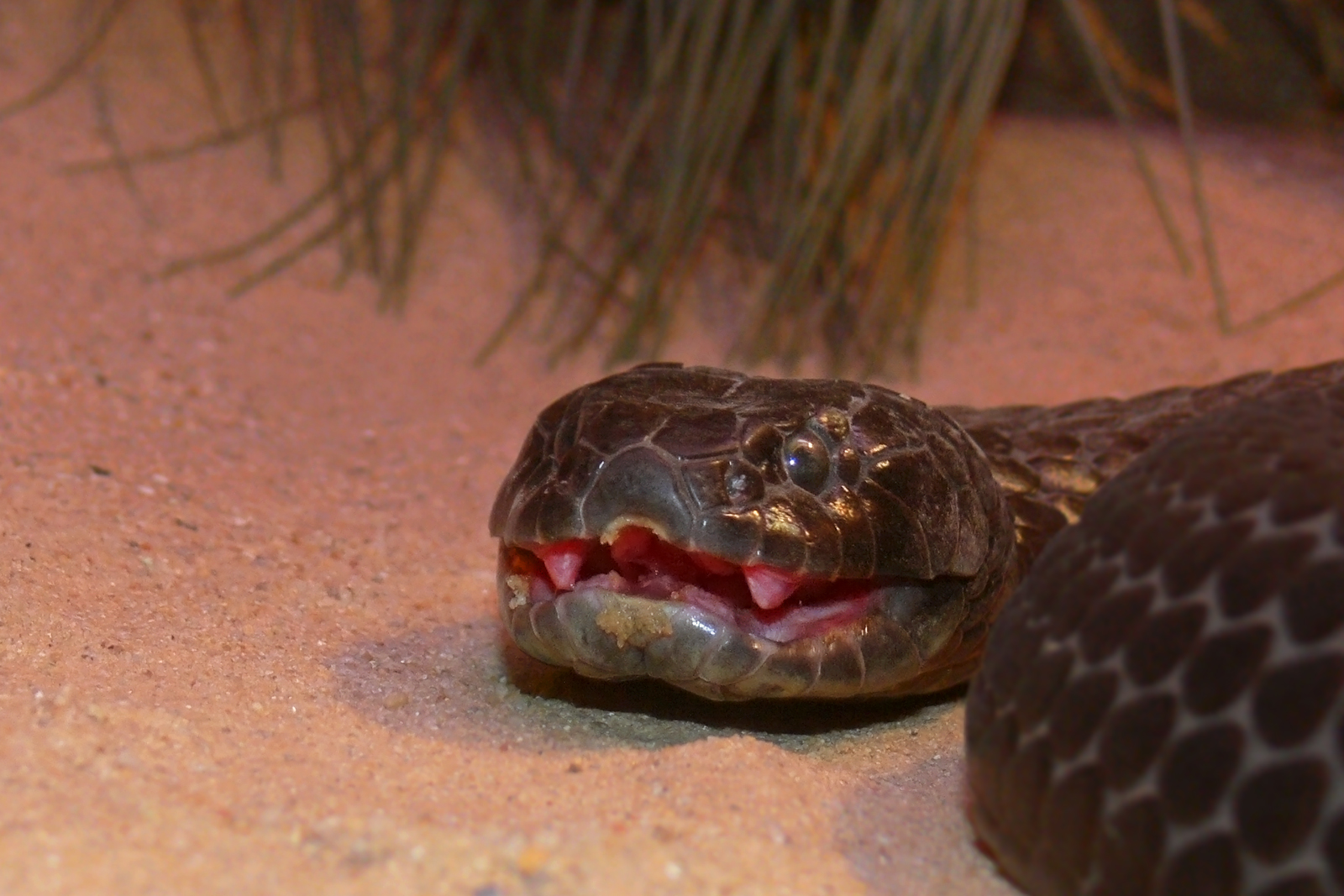
Notechis scutatus tiger snakes from islands, like this one from Chappell Island, have larger heads than mainland populations, apparently genetically assimilated.

Several instances of genetic assimilation have been documented contributing to natural selection in the wild. For example, populations of the island tiger snakes (Notechis scutatus) have become isolated on islands and have larger heads to cope with large prey animals. Young populations have larger heads by phenotypic plasticity, whereas large heads have become genetically assimilated in older populations.

In another example, patterns of left-right asymmetry or "handedness", when present, can be determined either genetically or plastically. During evolution, genetically determined directional asymmetry, as in the left-oriented human heart, can arise either from a nonheritable (phenotypic) developmental process, or directly by mutation from a symmetric ancestor. An excess of transitions from plastically determined to genetically determined handedness points to the role of genetic assimilation in evolution.

A third example has been seen in yeast. Evolutionary events in which stop codons are lost preserve the reading frame much more often than would be expected from mutation bias. This finding is consistent with the role of the yeast prion [PSI+] in epigenetically facilitating stop codon readthrough, followed by genetic assimilation via the permanent loss of the stop codon.

== See also ==
- Evolutionary developmental biology
- List of genetics-related topics
