= Dusa McDuff =

English mathematician

Dusa McDuff FRS
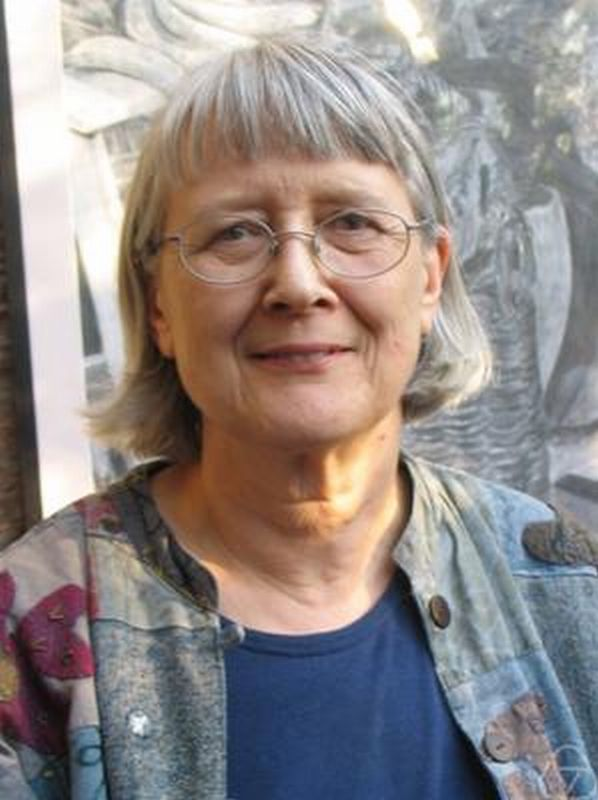
- Dusa McDuff, Edinburgh 2009 (80th Birthday of Michael Atiyah)
- Born: Margaret Dusa Waddington; 18 October 1945 (age 80); London, England
- Education: University of Edinburgh; Girton College, Cambridge
- Spouses: David McDuff (m. 1968; div. 1978) John Milnor (m. 1984)
- Parents: Conrad Waddington (father); Justin Blanco White (mother)
- Awards: BMS Morning Speaker; Satter Prize (1991); Fellow of the Royal Society; Corresponding Fellow of the Royal Society of Edinburgh (2008); Speaker at International Congress of Mathematicians; BMC Plenary Speaker; Sylvester Medal (2018)
- Scientific career
- Fields: Mathematics
- Workplaces: University of Cambridge; University of York; University of Warwick; Massachusetts Institute of Technology; Institute for Advanced Study; Stony Brook University; Barnard College
- Doctoral advisor: George A. Reid
- Doctoral students: Katrin Wehrheim

Dusa McDuff FRS CorrFRSE (born 18 October 1945) is an English mathematician who works on symplectic geometry. She was the first recipient of the Ruth Lyttle Satter Prize in Mathematics, was a Noether Lecturer, and is a Fellow of the Royal Society. She is currently the Helen Lyttle Kimmel '42 Professor of Mathematics at Barnard College.

== Personal life and education ==
Margaret Dusa Waddington was born in London, England, on 18 October 1945 to Edinburgh architect Margaret Justin Blanco White, second wife of biologist Conrad Hal Waddington, her father. Her sister is the anthropologist Caroline Humphrey, and she has an elder half-brother C. Jake Waddington by her father's first marriage. Her mother was the daughter of Amber Reeves, the noted feminist, author and lover of H. G. Wells. McDuff grew up in Scotland where her father was Professor of Genetics at the University of Edinburgh. McDuff was educated at St George's School for Girls in Edinburgh and, although the standard was lower than at the corresponding boys' school, The Edinburgh Academy, McDuff had an exceptionally good mathematics teacher. She writes:

I always wanted to be a mathematician (apart from a time when I was eleven when I wanted to be a farmer's wife), and assumed that I would have a career, but I had no idea how to go about it: I didn't realize that the choices which one made about education were important and I had no idea that I might experience real difficulties and conflicts in reconciling the demands of a career with life as a woman.

Turning down a scholarship to the University of Cambridge to stay with her boyfriend in Scotland, she enrolled at the University of Edinburgh. She graduated with a BSc Hons in 1967, going on to Girton College, Cambridge as a doctoral student. Here, under the guidance of mathematician George A. Reid, McDuff worked on problems in functional analysis. She solved a problem on Von Neumann algebras, constructing infinitely many different factors of type II_{1}, and published the work in the Annals of Mathematics.

After completing her doctorate in 1971 McDuff was appointed to a two-year Science Research Council Postdoctoral Fellowship at Cambridge. Following her husband, the literary translator David McDuff, she left for a six-month visit to Moscow. Her husband was studying the Russian Symbolist poet Innokenty Annensky. Though McDuff had no specific plans it turned out to be a profitable visit for her mathematically. There, she met Israel Gelfand in Moscow who gave her a deeper appreciation of mathematics. McDuff later wrote:

[My collaboration with him]... was not planned: it happened that his was the only name which came to mind when I had to fill out a form in the Inotdel office. The first thing that Gel'fand told me was that he was much more interested in the fact that my husband was studying the Russian Symbolist poet Innokenty Annensky than that I had found infinitely many type II-sub-one factors, but then he proceeded to open my eyes to the world of mathematics. It was a wonderful education, in which reading Pushkin, Mozart and Salieri played as important a role as learning about Lie groups or reading Cartan and Eilenberg. Gel'fand amazed me by talking of mathematics as though it were poetry. He once said about a long paper bristling with formulas that it contained the vague beginnings of an idea which he could only hint at and which he had never managed to bring out more clearly. I had always thought of mathematics as being much more straightforward: a formula is a formula, and an algebra is an algebra, but Gel'fand found hedgehogs lurking in the rows of his spectral sequences!

On returning to Cambridge McDuff started attending Frank Adams's topology lectures and was soon invited to teach at the University of York. In 1975 she separated from her husband, and was divorced in 1978. At the University of York, she "essentially wrote a second PhD" while working with Graeme Segal. At this time a position at Massachusetts Institute of Technology (MIT) opened up for her, reserved for visiting female mathematicians. Her career as a mathematician developed further while at MIT, and soon she was accepted to the Institute for Advanced Study where she worked with Segal on the Atiyah–Segal completion theorem. She then returned to England, where she took up a lectureship at the University of Warwick.

Around this time she met mathematician John Milnor who was then based in Princeton University. To live closer to him she took up an untenured assistant professorship at the Stony Brook University. Now an independent mathematician, she began work on the relationship between diffeomorphisms and the classifying space for foliations. She has since worked on symplectic topology. In the spring of 1985, McDuff attended the Institut des Hautes Études Scientifiques in Paris to study Mikhael Gromov's work on elliptic methods. Since 2007, she has held the Helen Lyttle Kimmel chair at Barnard College.

In 1984 McDuff married Milnor, now a professor at Stony Brook University, and a Fields Medal recipient, Wolf Prize winner and Abel Prize Laureate.

== Work and research ==
For the past 30 years McDuff has been a contributor to the development of the field of symplectic geometry and topology. She gave the first example of symplectic forms on a closed manifold that are cohomologous but not diffeomorphic and also classified the rational and ruled symplectic four-manifolds, completed with François Lalonde. More recently, partly in collaboration with Susan Tolman, she has studied applications of methods of symplectic topology to the theory of Hamiltonian torus actions. She has also worked on embedding capacities of 4-dimensional symplectic ellipsoids with Felix Schlenk, which gives rise to some very interesting number-theoretical questions. It also indicates a connection between the combinatorics of J-holomorphic curves in the blow up of the projective plane and the numbers that appear as indices in embedded contact homology. With Katrin Wehrheim, she has challenged the foundational rigor of a classic proof in symplectic geometry.

With Dietmar Salamon, she co-authored two textbooks Introduction to Symplectic Topology and J-Holomorphic Curves and Symplectic Topology.

== Honours and recognition ==
McDuff was the first to be awarded the Satter Prize, in 1991, for her work on symplectic geometry; she is a Fellow of the Royal Society (1994), a Noether Lecturer (1998) and a member of both the United States National Academy of Sciences (1999) and the American Philosophical Society (2013). In 2008 she was elected a Corresponding Fellow of the Royal Society of Edinburgh. She was a Plenary Lecturer at the 1998 International Congress of Mathematicians (ICM) and an Invited Speaker at the 1990 ICM. In 2012 she became a fellow of the American Mathematical Society. In 1999, she was the first female Hardy Lecturer, an award from the London Mathematical Society. She is also a member of the Academia Europaea, and is part of the 2019 class of fellows of the Association for Women in Mathematics.

In 2010, she was awarded the Senior Berwick Prize of the London Mathematical Society. For 2017 she received, jointly with Dietmar Salamon, the AMS Leroy P. Steele Prize for Mathematical Exposition. In 2018 she received the Sylvester Medal by the Royal Society. For 2025 McDuff was awarded the AMS Leroy P. Steele Prize for Lifetime Achievement.
