= Caroline Humphrey =

British anthropologist and academic

The Right Honourable The Lady Rees of Ludlow DBE FBA
- Born: Caroline Waddington; 1 September 1943 (age 83)
- Title: Sigrid Rausing Professor of Collaborative Anthropology
- Spouses: Nicholas Humphrey (m. 1967–1977) Martin Rees (m. 1986)
- Parent(s): C. H. Waddington; Margaret Justin Blanco White

Academic background
- Education: St George's School, Edinburgh
- Alma mater: Girton College, Cambridge; University of Leeds

Academic work
- Discipline: Anthropology
- Institutions: University of Cambridge; Girton College, Cambridge; Scott Polar Research Institute; King's College, Cambridge

Caroline Humphrey, Baroness Rees of Ludlow, DBE, FBA (née Waddington; born 1 September 1943) is a British anthropologist and academic.

== Biography ==
Humphrey's father was the biologist Conrad H. Waddington. Her mother was her father's second wife, architect Margaret Justin Blanco White (daughter of the writer Amber Reeves); she has a younger sister, the mathematician Dusa McDuff, and an elder half-brother, the physicist C. Jake Waddington, by her father's first marriage to Cecil Elizabeth Lascelles.

Humphrey received a BA degree in Social Anthropology from Girton College, Cambridge. Her PhD, completed in 1973, was entitled Magical Drawings in the Religion of the Buryat. She received the Rivers Memorial Medal in 1999, and, in 2003, an Honorary Doctorate from the National University of Mongolia. Humphrey was awarded an honorary doctorate by the University of Bolton in 2017 for her outstanding contribution to the field of anthropology.

== Personal life ==
In 1967, Caroline Waddington married Nicholas Humphrey; they had no children and divorced in 1977. In 1986, she married Martin Rees.

== Research and positions ==
Humphrey has conducted research in Siberia, Nepal, India, Mongolia, China (Inner Mongolia), Uzbekistan and Ukraine. In 1966, she was one of the first Anthropologist from a western country to be allowed to do fieldwork in the USSR. Her PhD (1973) focussed on Buryat religious iconography, and ensuing research topics have included Soviet collective farms, the farming economy in India and Tibet, Jainist culture in India, and environmental and cultural conservation in Inner Asia.

Between 1971 and 1978, she undertook research, holding a fellowship at Girton College, Cambridge and at a post at the Scott Polar Research Institute. From 1978 to 1983 she lectured at the Department of Social Anthropology at the University of Cambridge, before becoming a director of studies in archaeology and anthropology in 1984-89, and 1992-96. Humphrey has held the posts of university reader in Asian anthropology, University of Cambridge, 1995–98; university professor of Asian anthropology, 1998–2006; visiting professor at the University of Michigan, 2000; and Rausing Professorship of Collaborative Anthropology, 2006–10.

In 1986 she co-founded the Mongolia and Inner Asia Studies Unit (MIASU) at Cambridge, together with Urgunge Onon. She retired from her post as Sigrid Rausing Professor of Collaborative Anthropology at the University of Cambridge to become Voluntary Research Director of MIASU in October 2010.

She has been a Fellow of King's College, Cambridge since 1978. In 2010, she completed the manuscript of a monograph, jointly written with Hurelbaatar Ujeed, entitled A Monastery in Time: the Making of Mongolian Buddhism. The book was the culmination of fieldwork and visits, from 1995, to Mergen Monastery in the Urad Mongols region of Inner Mongolia (China), where a distinctive form of Mongolian-language Buddhism has survived since the 18th century.

== Honours ==
In the 2011 New Year Honours, Humphrey was appointed Dame Commander of the Order of the British Empire (DBE) 'for services to scholarship'. Humphrey is an honorary fellow of Robinson College, Cambridge. In 2004, she was elected to the American Philosophical Society.

== Work ==
- Karl Marx Collective: Economy, Society and Religion in a Siberian Collective Farm [Staley Prize, School of American Research] (1983)
- (ed. with Michael Carrithers) The Assembly of Listeners: Jains in Society (1991)
- (ed. with Stephen Hugh-Jones) Barter, Exchange and Value (1992)
- (ed. with Nicholas Thomas) Shamanism, History and the State (1994)
- (with James Laidlaw) The Archetypal Actions of Ritual, illustrated by the Jain rite of worship (1994)
- (with Urgunge Onon) Shamans and Elders: Experience, Knowledge and Power among the Daur Mongols (1996)
- (ed. with David Sneath) Culture and Environment in Inner Asia (1996)
- (with Piers Vitebsky) Sacred Architecture (1997) [This is a popular work]
- Marx Went Away, but Karl Stayed Behind (1998)
- (with David Sneath) The End of Nomadism? Society, the State and the Environment in Inner Asia (1999)
- (ed. with A. Tulokhonov) Kul'tura i Priroda vo Vnutrenneyi Azii (Culture and Environment in Inner Asia, in Russian) (2001)
- (ed. with David Sneath) Dotugadu Aziiya-yin Soyol kiged Baigal Orchim (Environment and Culture of Inner Asia, in Mongolian) (2002)
- The Unmaking of Soviet Life: Everyday Economies After Socialism [Heldt Prize] (2002)
- (ed. with Katherine Verdery) Property in Question: Value Transformation in the Global Economy (2004)
- (ed. with Catherine Alexander and Victor Buchli) Urban Life in Post-Soviet Central Asia (2007)
- (with Hurelbaatar Ujeed) A Monastery in Time: The Making of Mongolian Buddhism [Association for Asian Studies: E. Gene Smith Book Prize Honorable Mention] (2013)
