= Maud Pember Reeves =

Suffragist and member of the Fabian Society

- Reeves, date unknown
- Born: Magdalene Stuart Robison; 24 December 1865; Mudgee, New South Wales, Australia
- Died: 13 September 1953 (aged 87); Auckland, New Zealand
- Occupation: Political activist
- Known for: Feminism, membership of the Fabian Society
- Notable work: Round About a Pound a Week (1913)
- Spouse: William Pember Reeves (m. 1885; died 1932)
- Children: 3, including Amber Reeves

Maud Pember Reeves (24 December 1865 – 13 September 1953) (born Magdalene Stuart Robison) was a feminist, writer and member of the Fabian Society. She spent most of her life in New Zealand and Britain.

== Early life ==
She was born in Mudgee, New South Wales, Australia, to bank manager William Smoult Robison; the family moved to Christchurch, New Zealand in 1868. In 1885, she married the journalist and politician William Pember Reeves and became interested in socialism and the suffragist movements, having become involved in the suffrage issue through Julius Vogel. Women's suffrage in New Zealand was granted in 1893, Maud having joined the Canterbury Women's Institute in 1892, and been an activist on its behalf, collecting signatures for a petition.

In 1896, the family moved to London after William's appointment as Agent-General, the representative of New Zealand government within the British Empire.

== London associations ==
In the late 1890s, Maud Pember Reeves joined the Pioneer Club.

The couple became friends with a number of left-wing intellectuals, such as George Bernard Shaw, H. G. Wells, and Sidney and Beatrice Webb. Maud joined the Fabian Society which promoted social reform.

== Fabian Women's Group ==
Reeves was one of the founders of the Fabian Women's Group (FWG), with Charlotte Wilson. With Charlotte Shaw and Bessie Hutchins, she had pressed in 1907 on the Fabian Society executive for action on sex equality, supported also by Millicent Murby, but encountered reluctance. She hosted the first meeting of the FWG in the family home. Other members of the FWG included Beatrice Webb, Alice Clark, Edith Nesbit, Susan Lawrence, Margaret Bondfield, and Marion Phillips.

During the suffragist protests of 1908, 11 members of the FWG were imprisoned. Lady Glasgow (née Dorothea Hunter-Blair), wife of David Boyle, 7th Earl of Glasgow, spoke for the Women's National Anti-Suffrage League and claimed the 1893 New Zealand general election was disorderly, from the standpoint of one married to the Governor-General of New Zealand at the time. Maud Pember Reeves and Anna Stout contradicted her directly, stating they were eyewitnesses in a way she was not.

A further concern of the FWG was the economic independence of women. Members who wrote on this area included also Mabel Atkinson and Barbara Drake. In 1913 Reeves published as Fabian Tract #162 a survey of poverty in Lambeth, a poor borough in South London, called Round About a Pound a Week, a work that was reprinted in 2008 by Persephone Books.

== World War I ==
During the First World War, Reeves served on a government committee concerned with women's issues. She was director of the Education and Propaganda department of the Ministry of Food; and in 1917–1918, she directed with Constance Peel the women's service of the Ministry concerned with voluntary rationing.

== Family ==
William and Maud Reeves had two daughters, the feminist writer Amber Reeves (born 1887) and Beryl (born 1889); and one son, Fabian Pember Reeves (1895–1917). He was killed in the First World War, aged 21 while a Flight Lieutenant in the RNAS. Maud gave her (legal) name as Magdalene (or Magdalen) Stuart Reeves on their New Zealand birth certificates.

== See also ==
- first-wave feminism
