= C. H. Waddington =

British biologist

Conrad Hal Waddington CBE FRS FRSE
- Conrad Hal Waddington in 1934
- Born: 8 November 1905; Evesham, Worcestershire, England
- Died: 26 September 1975 (aged 69); Edinburgh, Scotland
- Education: University of Cambridge
- Known for: Epigenetic landscape, canalisation, genetic assimilation, creode
- Spouse: Justin Blanco White
- Children: 3, including Caroline Humphrey and Dusa McDuff
- Awards: Mendel Medal (1960)
- Scientific career
- Fields: Developmental biology, genetics, paleontology
- Workplaces: University of Edinburgh; University of Cambridge, Christ's College; Wesleyan University; Centre for Human Ecology
- Doctoral students: Robert Edwards

Conrad Hal Waddington CBE FRS FRSE (8 November 1905 – 26 September 1975) was a British developmental biologist, paleontologist, geneticist, embryologist and philosopher who laid the foundations for systems biology, epigenetics, and evolutionary developmental biology.

His theory of genetic assimilation probably has a Darwinian explanation, which contrast with the fact that Waddington himself was very critical about the notion of natural selection and Neo-Darwinism. Leading evolutionary biologists including Theodosius Dobzhansky and Ernst Mayr considered that Waddington was using genetic assimilation to support so-called Lamarckian inheritance, the acquisition of inherited characteristics through the effects of the environment during an organism's lifetime.

Waddington had wide interests that included poetry and painting, as well as left-wing political leanings. In his book The Scientific Attitude (1941), he touched on political topics such as central planning, and praised Marxism as a "profound scientific philosophy".

== Life ==
Conrad Waddington, known as "Wad" to his friends and "Con" to family, was born in Evesham to Hal and Mary Ellen (Warner) Waddington, on 8 November 1905.

His family moved to India and until nearly three years of age, Waddington lived in India, where his father worked on a tea estate in the Wayanad district of Kerala. In 1910, at the age of four, he was sent to live with family in England including his aunt, uncle, and Quaker grandmother. His parents remained in India until 1928. During his childhood, he was particularly attached to a local druggist and distant relation, Dr. Doeg. Doeg, whom Waddington called "Grandpa", introduced Waddington to a wide range of sciences from chemistry to geology. During the year following the completion of his entrance exams to university, Waddington received an intense course in chemistry from E. J. Holmyard. Aside from being "something of a genius of a [chemistry] teacher," Holmyard introduced Waddington to the "Alexandrian Gnostics" and the "Arabic Alchemists." From these lessons in metaphysics, Waddington first gained an appreciation for interconnected holistic systems. Waddington reflected that this early education prepared him for Alfred North Whitehead's philosophy in the 1920s and 30s and the cybernetics of Norbert Wiener and others in the 1940s.

He attended Clifton College and Sidney Sussex College, Cambridge. He took the Natural Sciences Tripos, earning a First in Part II in geology in 1926. In 1928, he was awarded an Arnold Gerstenberg Studentship in the University of Cambridge, whose purpose was to promote "the study of Moral Philosophy and Metaphysics among students of Natural Science, both men and women." He took up a Lecturership in Zoology and was a Fellow of Christ's College until 1942. His friends included Gregory Bateson, Walter Gropius, C. P. Snow, Solly Zuckerman, Joseph Needham, and John Desmond Bernal. His interests began with palaeontology but moved on to the heredity and development of living things. He also studied philosophy.

During World War II he was involved in operational research with the Royal Air Force (RAF) and became scientific advisor to the Commander in Chief of Coastal Command from 1944 to 1945. In this position a significant contribution of his was his analysis of aircraft maintenance schedules leading to the conclusion that manufacturer's specified maintenance and overhaul hourly figures were excessive for a wartime environment and that such frequent dismantling and re-assembling were more likely to lead to maintenance-induced-errors, therby reducing aircraft safety as well as availability. Subsequently revised schedules based on his work was adopted throughout the RAF.

After the war, in 1947, he replaced Francis Albert Eley Crew as Professor of Animal Genetics at the University of Edinburgh. He would stay at Edinburgh for the rest of life with the exception of 1960–1961 when he was a Fellow on the faculty in the Center for Advanced Studies at Wesleyan University in Middletown, Connecticut. and in 1970 when Waddington accepted the position of the Albert Einstein Chair in Science at the State University of New York in Buffalo, spending about two years there. His personal papers are largely kept at the University of Edinburgh library.

He died in Edinburgh on 26 September 1975.

== Family ==
Waddington was married twice. His first marriage produced a son, C. Jake Waddington, professor of physics at the University of Minnesota, but ended in 1936. He then married architect Margaret Justin Blanco White, daughter of the writer Amber Reeves, with whom he had two daughters, the anthropologist Caroline Humphrey (1943–) and mathematician Dusa McDuff (1945–).

== Evolution ==
In the early 1930s, Waddington and many other embryologists looked for the molecules that would induce the amphibian neural tube. The search was beyond the technology of that time, and most embryologists moved away from such deep problems. Waddington, however, came to the view that the answers to embryology lay in genetics, and in 1935 went to Thomas Hunt Morgan's Drosophila laboratory in California, even though this was a time when most embryologists felt that genes were unimportant and just played a role in minor phenomena such as eye colour.

In the late 1930s, Waddington produced formal models about how gene regulatory products could generate developmental phenomena, showed how the mechanisms underpinning Drosophila development could be studied through a systematic analysis of mutations that affected the development of the Drosophila wing. (Note: This was the essence of the approach that won the 1995 Nobel prize in medicine for Christiane Nüsslein-Volhard and Eric F. Wieschaus) In a period of great creativity at the end of the 1930s, he also discovered mutations that affected cell phenotypes and wrote his first textbook of "developmental epigenetics", a term that then meant the external manifestation of genetic activity.

Waddington introduced the concept of canalisation, the ability of an organism to produce the same phenotype despite variation in genotype or environment. He also identified a mechanism called genetic assimilation which would allow an animal's response to an environmental stress to become a fixed part of its developmental repertoire, and then went on to show that the mechanism would work.

In 1972, Waddington founded the Centre for Human Ecology in the University of Edinburgh.

=== Epigenetic landscape ===
Waddington's epigenetic landscape is a metaphor for how gene regulation modulates development. Among other metaphors, Waddington asks us to imagine a number of marbles rolling down a hill. The marbles will sample the grooves on the slope, and come to rest at the lowest points. These points represent the eventual cell fates, that is, tissue types. Waddington coined the term chreode to represent this cellular developmental process. The idea was based on experiment: Waddington found that one effect of mutation (which could modulate the epigenetic landscape) was to affect how cells differentiated. He also showed how mutation could affect the landscape, and used this metaphor in his discussions on evolution—he emphasised (like Ernst Haeckel before him) that evolution mainly occurred through mutations that affected developmental anatomy.

=== Genetic assimilation ===
Waddington's genetic assimilation compared to Lamarckism, Darwinian evolution, and the Baldwin effect. All the theories offer explanations of how organisms respond to a changed environment with adaptive inherited change.

Waddington proposed an evolutionary process, "genetic assimilation", as a Darwinian mechanism that allows certain acquired characteristic to become heritable. According to Adam Navis, (2007) "Waddington focused his genetic assimilation work on the crossveinless trait of Drosophila. This trait occurs with high frequency in heat-treated flies. After a few generations, the trait can be found in the population, without the application of heat, based on hidden genetic variation that Waddington asserted had been "assimilated".

=== Neo-Darwinism versus Lamarckism ===
Waddington's theory of genetic assimilation was controversial. The evolutionary biologists Theodosius Dobzhansky and Ernst Mayr both thought that Waddington was using genetic assimilation to support Lamarckian inheritance. They denied that genetic assimilation had taken place, and asserted that Waddington had simply observed the natural selection of genetic variants that already existed in the study population. Other biologists such as Wallace Arthur disagree, writing that "genetic assimilation, looks, but is not Lamarckian. It is a special case of the evolution of phenotypic plasticity". Adam S. Wilkins wrote that "[Waddington] in his lifetime... was widely perceived primarily as a critic of Neo-Darwinian evolutionary theory. His criticisms ... were focused on what he saw as unrealistic, 'atomistic' models of both gene selection and trait evolution." In particular, according to Wilkins, Waddington felt that the Neo-Darwinians badly neglected the phenomenon of extensive gene interactions and that the "randomness" of mutational effects, posited in the theory, was false. Even though Waddington became critical of the neo-Darwinian synthetic theory of evolution, he still described himself as a Darwinian, and called for an extended evolutionary synthesis based on his research. Reviewing the debate in 2015, the systems biologist Denis Noble writes however that

[Waddington] did not describe himself as a Lamarckian, but by revealing mechanisms of inheritance of acquired characteristics, I think he should be regarded as such. The reason he did not do so is that Lamarck could not have conceived of the processes that Waddington revealed. Incidentally, it is also true to say that Lamarck did not invent the idea of the inheritance of acquired characteristics. But, whether historically correct or not, we are stuck today with the term 'Lamarckian' for inheritance of a characteristic acquired through an environmental influence.

== As an organiser ==
Waddington was very active in advancing biology as a discipline. He contributed to a book on the role of the sciences in times of war, and helped set up several professional bodies representing biology as a discipline.

A remarkable number of his contemporary colleagues in Edinburgh became Fellows of the Royal Society during his time there, or shortly thereafter. Waddington was an old-fashioned intellectual who lived in both the arts and science milieus of the 1950s and wrote widely. His 1969 book Behind Appearance; a Study of the Relations Between Painting and the Natural Sciences in This Century (MIT press) not only has wonderful pictures but is still worth reading. Waddington was, without doubt, the most original and important thinker about developmental biology of the pre-molecular age and the medal of the British Society for Developmental Biology is named after him.

Waddington co-founded The Institute for Advanced Studies in the Humanities at the University of Edinburgh in 1969 with Professor John MacQueen, Professor of Scottish Literature and Oral Tradition.

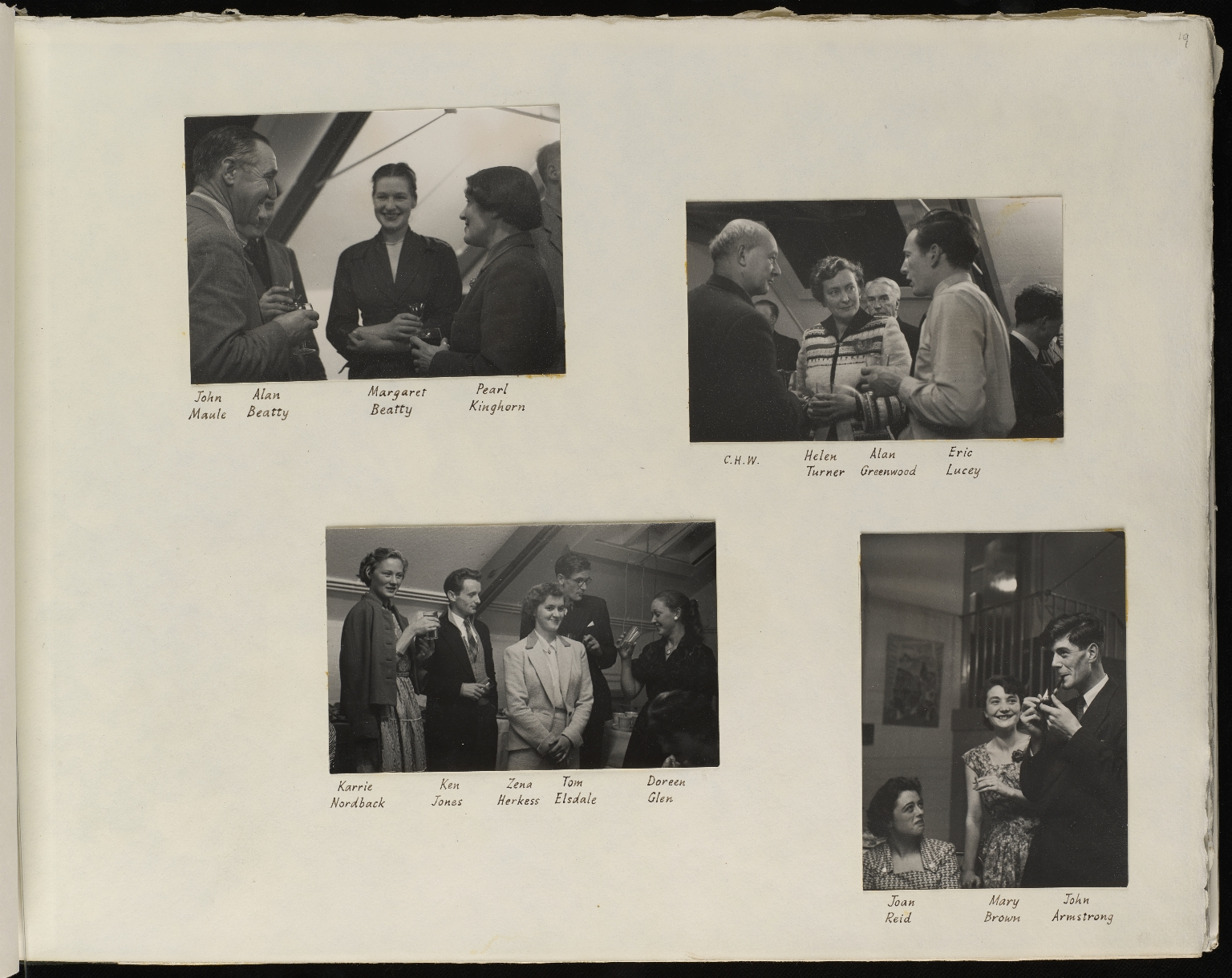
Pages from a photograph album, given to Waddington by his colleagues on his 50th birthday.

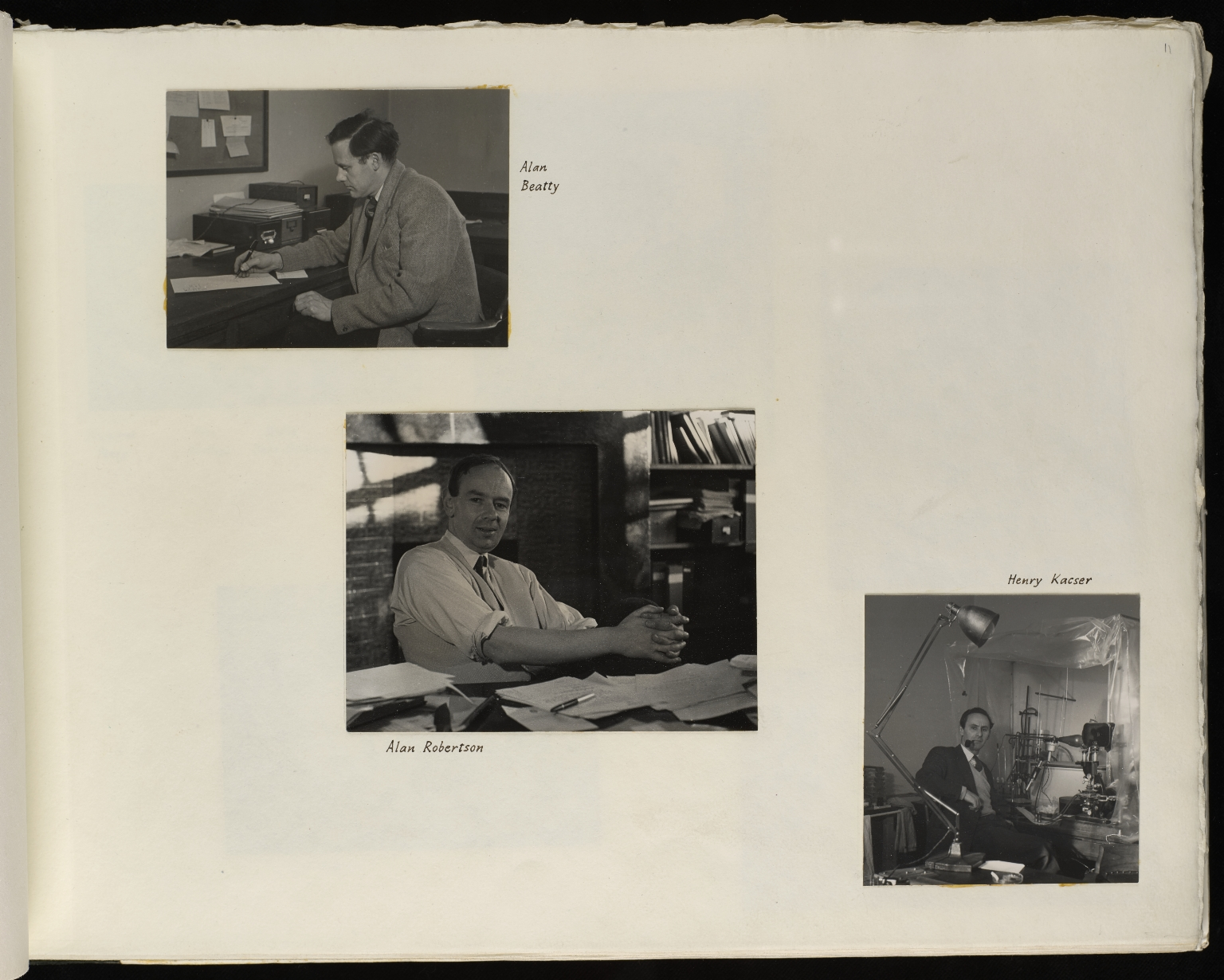

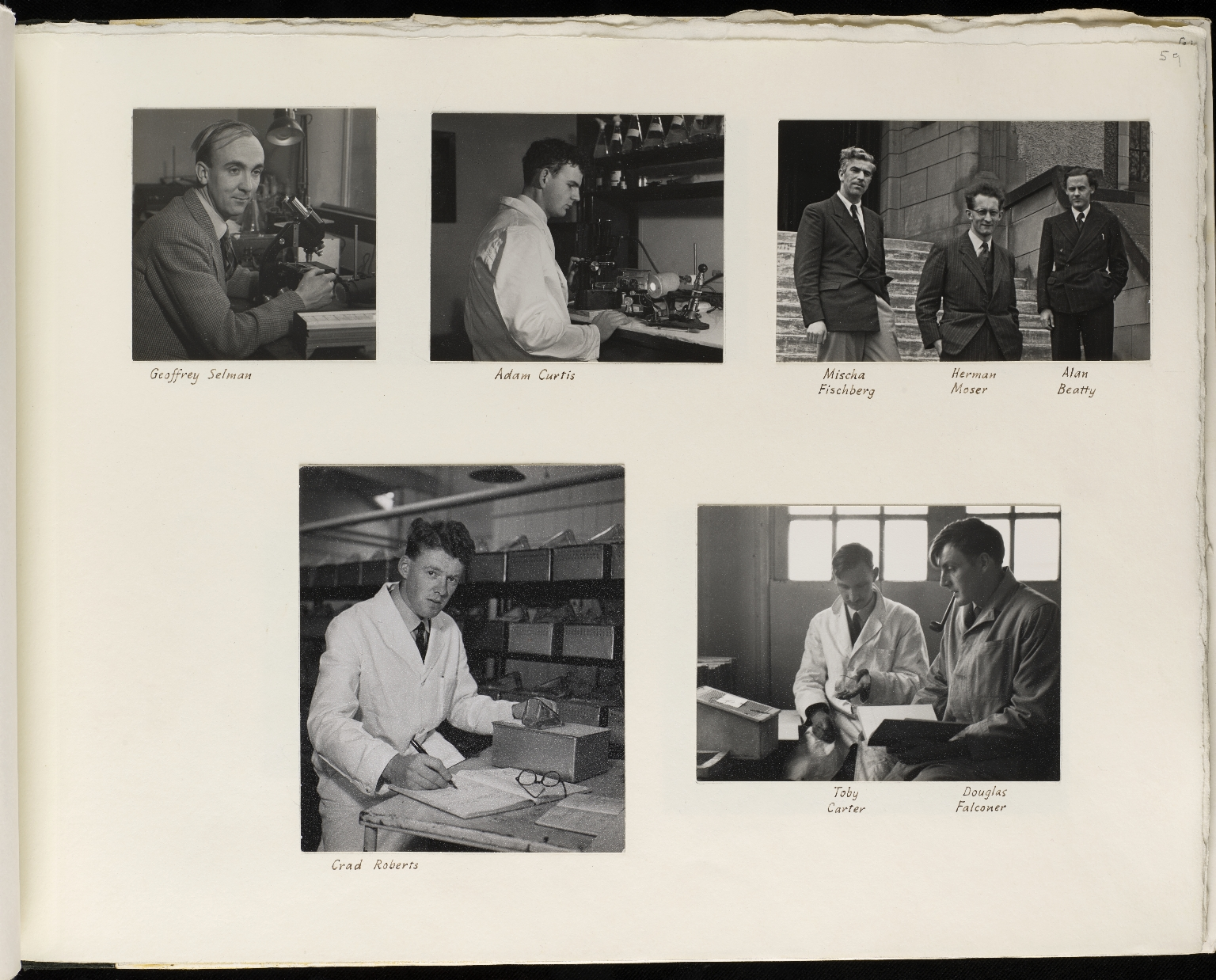

== Reception ==
Despite Waddington's ideas being considered an influential foundation of contemporary evolutionary developmental biology ("evo-devo"), they were viewed by many as at best heterodox. It has been suggested by some that Waddington's association with Alfred North Whitehead and his metaphysical ideas may have contributed to the marginalisation of his hypotheses, combined with a lack of support from mainstream institutions for his research programme.

== Selected works ==
=== Books ===
- Waddington, C. H. (1939). An Introduction to Modern Genetics. London : George Alien & Unwin.
- ––– (1940). Organisers & Genes. Cambridge: Cambridge University Press.
- ––– and others Science and Ethics. George Allen & Unwin. 1942 – via Internet Archive.
- ––– (1946). How Animals Develop. London : George Allen & Unwin.
- ––– The Scientific Attitude (2nd ed.). Pelican Books. 1948 – via Internet Archive.
- ––– (1953). The Epigenetics of birds. Cambridge : Cambridge University Press.
- ––– (1956). Principles of Embryology. London : George Allen & Unwin.
- ––– (1957). The Strategy of the Genes. London : George Allen & Unwin.
- ––– (1959). Biological Organisation Cellular and Subcellular : Proceedings of a Symposium. London: Pergamon Press.
- ––– (1960). The Ethical Animal. London : George Allen & Unwin.
- ––– (1961). The Human Evolutionary System. In: Michael Banton (Ed.), Darwinism and the Study of Society. London: Tavistock.
- ––– (1961). The Nature of Life. London : George, Allen, & Unwin.
- ––– (1962). New Patterns in Genetics and Development. New York: Columbia University Press.
- ––– (1966). Principles of Development and Differentiation. New York: Macmillan Company.
- ––– (1970). 72). Behind Appearance : A Study in the Relationship Between Painting and the Natural Sciences in this Century. The MIT Press.
- –––, ed. (1968–72). Towards a Theoretical Biology. 4 vols. Edinburgh: Edinburgh University Press.
- –––, Kenny, A., Longuet-Higgins, H.C., Lucas, J.R. (1972). The Nature of Mind, Edinburgh: Edinburgh University Press.
- –––, Kenny, A., Longuet-Higgins, H. C., Lucas, J. R. (1973). The Development of Mind, Edinburgh: Edinburgh University Press (1971-3 Gifford Lectures in Edinburgh, online)
- ––– (1973) O.R. in World War 2: Operational Research Against the U-Boat. London: Elek Science.
- –––, & Jantsch, E. (Eds.). (1976). (published posthumously). Evolution and Consciousness: Human Systems in Transition. Addison-Wesley.
- ––– (1977) (published posthumously). Tools for Thought. London: Jonathan Cape.

=== Papers ===
- Waddington, C. H. (1942). Canalization of development and the inheritance of acquired characters. Nature 150 (3811):563–565.
- ––– (1946). Human Ideals and Human Progress. World Review August:29-36.
- ––– & Carter T. C. (1952). Malformations in mouse embryos induced by trypan blue. Nature 169 (4288):27-28.
- ––– (1952). Selection of the Genetic Basis for an Acquired Character. Nature 169 (4294):278.
- ––– (1953). Genetic assimilation of an acquired character. Evolution 7:118–126.
- ––– (1953). Epigenetics and evolution. Symposia of the Society of Experimental Biology 7:186–199.
- ––– (1956). Genetic assimilation of the bithorax phenotype. Evolution 10:1–13.
- ––– (1961). Genetic assimilation. Advances in Genetics 10:257–290.
- ––– & Russell J Cowe (1969). Computer Simulation of a Mulluscan Pigmentation Pattern. Journal of Theoretical Biology July pp 219–225.
- ––– (1974). A Catastrophe Theory of Evolution. Annals of the New York Academy of Sciences 231:32–42.
- ––– (1977) (published posthumously). Whitehead and Modern Science. Mind in Nature: The Interface of Science and Philosophy. Ed. John B. Cobb and David R. Griffin. University Press of America.
