= AMS Centennial Fellowship =

Research award

The AMS Centennial Research Fellowship is presented annually to outstanding mathematicians who have held the doctoral degree for between three and twelve years. The primary selection criterion is excellence in research achievement.

A Research Fellowship Fund was established by the American Mathematical Society in 1973.

== Previous awards ==
- 2026 – 2027 Wencai Liu
- 2025 – 2026 Zhouli Xu
- 2024 – 2025 Francesc Castella
- 2023 – 2024 Joel Nagloo
- 2022 – 2023 Mimi Dai
- 2021 – 2022 Aaron J Pollack
- 2020 – 2021 Ilya Khayutin
- 2019 – 2020 Piotr Przytycki
- 2018 – 2019 Nguyen, Toan
- 2017 – 2018 Takeda, Shuichiro
- 2016 – 2017 Lubetzky, Eyal
- 2015 – 2016 Schnell, Christian; Lee, Kyungyong
- 2014 – 2015 Juschenko, Kate
- 2013 – 2014 Zhu, Xinwen
- 2012 – 2013 Melnick, Karin
- 2011 – 2012 Toms, Andrew
- 2010 – 2011 Bellaiche, Joel
- 2009 – 2010 Montalban, Antonio
- 2008 – 2009 Hoffman, Christopher
- 2007 – 2008 Kassabov, Martin
- 2006 – 2007 Hacon, Christopher; Kra, Bryna
- 2005 – 2006 Lee, Yuan-Pin; Popa, Mihnea
- 2004 – 2005 Baik, Jinho; Kitchloo, Nitu
- 2003 – 2004 Kim, Henry; Meier, John
- 2002 – 2003 Fannjiang, Albert; Gan, Wee Teck; Ramakrishna, Ravi
- 2001 – 2002 Dimitrov, Ivan; Vakil, Ravi; Wu, Jiahong; Zhu, Meijun
- 2000 – 2001 Fu, Siqi; Herald, Christopher; Ruan, Wei-Dong; Strela, Vasily
- 1999 – 2000 Rezk, Charles; Wang, Bin; Wang, Changyou; Yang, Tonghai
- 1998 – 1999 de Cataldo, Mark; Garoufalidis, Stavros; Kovács, Sándor; Li, Yanguang
- 1997 – 1998 Costin, Ovidiu; Diamond, Fred; Liu, Gang; Shen, Zhongwei;
- 1996 – 1997 Hu, Yi; McCann, Robert; Voronov, Alexander; Wang, Jiaping
- 1995 – 1996 de la Llave, Rafael; McCallum, William Gordon; Orr, Kent
- 1994 – 1995 Bauman, Patricia; Marker, David
- 1993 – 1994 Hurtubise, Jacques; Scedrov, Andre; Webb, David
- 1992 – 1993 Burdzy, Krzysztof; William Menasco; David Morrison
- 1991 – 1992 Bump, Daniel; Vilonen, Kari
- 1990 – 1991 Anderson, Michael; Gordon, Carolyn; Mitchell, Steven
- 1989 – 1990 Efrat, Isaac; Lee, John; Spatzier, Ralf
- 1988 – 1989 Bell, Steven; Blasius, Don; Gabai, David
- 1987 – 1988 Hain, Richard; Jacob, Bill
- 1986 – 1987 Ramakrishnan, Dinakar
- 1985 – 1986 Beals, Michael
- 1984 – 1985 Durrett, Richard
- 1983 – 1984 Lyons, Russell
- 1982 – 1983 Kuhn, Nicholas
- 1981 – 1982 Ein, Lawrence; Williams, Mark
- 1980 – 1981 Lazarsfeld, Robert; Parker, Thomas; Sachs, Robert
- 1979 – 1980 Brown, Scott; Hoffstein, Jeffrey; Kahn, Jeffry; McClure, James; Smith, Rick
- 1978 – 1979 Dankner, Alan; Harbater, David; Hiller, Howard; Kerckhoff, Steven; McOwen, Robert
- 1977 – 1978 Kalikow, Steven; Patton, Charles; Phong, Duong-Hong; Vogan, David
- 1976 – 1977 Ancel, Fredric; Sgro, Joseph
- 1975 – 1976 Gaffney, Terence; Nèvai, Paul; Reed, George
- 1974 – 1975 Abramson, Fred; Wang, James Li-Ming

== See also ==
- List of mathematics awards
