= List of lakes of Carbon County, Montana =

There are at least 178 named lakes and reservoirs in Carbon County, Montana.

== Lakes ==
- Abandoned Lake, 45°00′36″N 109°36′11″W, el. 10,036 feet (3,059 m)
- Albino Lake, 45°00′52″N 109°34′47″W, el. 9,990 feet (3,040 m)
- Alp Lake, 45°03′16″N 109°38′59″W, el. 9,770 feet (2,980 m)
- Anchor Lake, 45°03′27″N 109°42′31″W, el. 10,026 feet (3,056 m)
- Anvil Lake, 45°01′33″N 109°43′08″W, el. 9,708 feet (2,959 m)
- Arch Lake, 45°09′35″N 109°44′14″W, el. 10,026 feet (3,056 m)
- Arrowhead Lake, 45°01′58″N 109°36′20″W, el. 10,341 feet (3,152 m)
- Basin Creek Lake, 45°08′43″N 109°25′47″W, el. 8,993 feet (2,741 m)
- Bergschrund Lake, 45°05′31″N 109°42′38″W, el. 10,121 feet (3,085 m)
- Big Butte Lake, 45°03′43″N 109°42′13″W, el. 10,095 feet (3,077 m)
- Big Moose Lake, 45°00′04″N 109°45′43″W, el. 8,018 feet (2,444 m)
- Big Park Lake, 45°07′29″N 109°43′21″W, el. 8,264 feet (2,519 m)
- Black Canyon Lake, 45°04′12″N 109°31′54″W, el. 9,144 feet (2,787 m)
- Bowback Lake, 45°07′19″N 109°36′02″W, el. 10,394 feet (3,168 m)
- Broadwater Lake, 45°04′56″N 109°28′46″W, el. 7,985 feet (2,434 m)
- Burnt Bacon Lake, 45°00′43″N 109°39′37″W, el. 8,953 feet (2,729 m)
- Cairn Lake, 45°07′50″N 109°47′43″W, el. 10,184 feet (3,104 m)
- Canyon Lake, 45°02′21″N 109°46′02″W, el. 8,796 feet (2,681 m)
- Castle Lake, 45°03′07″N 109°39′29″W, el. 9,541 feet (2,908 m)
- Cladocera Lake, 45°04′18″N 109°39′43″W, el. 10,495 feet (3,199 m)
- Cloverleaf Lakes, 45°02′11″N 109°36′33″W, el. 10,164 feet (3,098 m)
- Copeland Lake, 45°00′21″N 109°43′38″W, el. 8,714 feet (2,656 m)
- Copepod Lake, 45°04′12″N 109°39′10″W, el. 10,420 feet (3,180 m)
- Cradle Lake, 45°04′11″N 109°46′26″W, el. 9,593 feet (2,924 m)
- Crazy Lakes, 45°01′00″N 109°46′59″W, el. 8,038 feet (2,450 m)
- Crescent Lake, 45°02′35″N 109°28′59″W, el. 9,993 feet (3,046 m)
- Crow Lake, 45°10′44″N 109°34′17″W, el. 9,068 feet (2,764 m)
- Crystal Lake, 45°02′57″N 109°38′28″W, el. 9,875 feet (3,010 m)
- Daly Lake, 45°02′42″N 109°28′06″W, el. 9,678 feet (2,950 m)
- Desolation Lake, 45°04′01″N 109°43′03″W, el. 10,187 feet (3,105 m)
- Dewey Lake, 45°06′37″N 109°45′28″W, el. 9,308 feet (2,837 m)
- Diamond Lake, 45°02′00″N 109°46′54″W, el. 8,550 feet (2,610 m)
- Donelson Lake, 45°02′53″N 109°37′05″W, el. 10,440 feet (3,180 m)
- Dude Lake, 45°08′11″N 109°35′04″W, el. 10,180 feet (3,100 m)
- Duggan Lake, 45°07′03″N 109°44′21″W, el. 8,806 feet (2,684 m)
- East Rosebud Lake, 45°11′51″N 109°38′35″W, el. 6,214 feet (1,894 m)
- Echo Lake, 45°07′50″N 109°44′58″W, el. 8,520 feet (2,600 m)
- Elephant Lake, 45°07′24″N 109°39′35″W, el. 9,498 feet (2,895 m)
- Elk Horn Lake, 45°02′32″N 109°29′07″W, el. 10,059 feet (3,066 m)
- Elk Lake, 45°09′54″N 109°39′34″W, el. 6,788 feet (2,069 m)
- Elpestrine Lake, 45°05′20″N 109°43′17″W, el. 10,938 feet (3,334 m)
- Erratic Lake, 45°03′27″N 109°40′19″W, el. 10,236 feet (3,120 m)
- Estelle Lake, 45°01′42″N 109°40′23″W, el. 9,186 feet (2,800 m)
- Falls Creek Lake, 45°06′05″N 109°42′45″W, el. 9,951 feet (3,033 m)
- Farley Lake, 45°02′03″N 109°42′33″W, el. 9,695 feet (2,955 m)
- First Rock Lake, 45°05′12″N 109°32′49″W, el. 8,835 feet (2,693 m)
- Flat Rock Lake, 45°04′02″N 109°38′06″W, el. 9,944 feet (3,031 m)
- Fossil Lake, 45°05′25″N 109°47′26″W, el. 9,905 feet (3,019 m)
- Fritter Lake, 45°01′42″N 109°42′58″W, el. 9,711 feet (2,960 m)
- Frosty Lake, 45°01′59″N 109°33′02″W, el. 10,987 feet (3,349 m)
- Gallery Lake, 45°04′30″N 109°45′53″W, el. 9,911 feet (3,021 m)
- Ghost Lake, 45°02′24″N 109°38′15″W, el. 10,072 feet (3,070 m)
- Glissade Lake, 45°05′46″N 109°42′53″W, el. 10,056 feet (3,065 m)
- Goat Lake, 45°01′13″N 109°33′24″W, el. 10,036 feet (3,059 m)
- Golden Lake, 45°01′25″N 109°36′01″W, el. 10,102 feet (3,079 m)
- Granite Lake, 45°00′11″N 109°40′01″W, el. 8,642 feet (2,634 m)
- Granite Lake, 45°09′23″N 109°47′15″W, el. 10,075 feet (3,071 m)
- Gravel Lake, 45°03′38″N 109°41′22″W, el. 10,272 feet (3,131 m)
- Green Lake, 45°01′58″N 109°39′49″W, el. 9,321 feet (2,841 m)
- Greenough Lake, 45°03′04″N 109°25′06″W, el. 7,283 feet (2,220 m)
- Hairpin Lake, 45°02′42″N 109°29′58″W, el. 10,151 feet (3,094 m)
- Hatchet Lake, 45°02′14″N 109°43′08″W, el. 9,895 feet (3,016 m)
- Heart Lake, 45°01′28″N 109°38′22″W, el. 9,941 feet (3,030 m)
- Hellroaring Lake, 45°02′33″N 109°28′26″W, el. 9,695 feet (2,955 m)
- Hellroaring Lakes, 45°02′38″N 109°29′50″W, el. 10,148 feet (3,093 m)
- Hermit Lake, 45°04′03″N 109°40′44″W, el. 10,633 feet (3,241 m)
- Hidden Lake, 45°00′20″N 109°37′37″W, el. 9,468 feet (2,886 m)
- High Pass Lake, 45°03′30″N 109°36′28″W, el. 10,859 feet (3,310 m)
- Indian Knife Lake, 45°03′15″N 109°43′54″W, el. 9,705 feet (2,958 m)
- Jasper Lake, 45°01′48″N 109°35′27″W, el. 10,134 feet (3,089 m)
- Jenny Lake, 45°01′58″N 109°44′27″W, el. 9,380 feet (2,860 m)
- Jorden Lake, 45°02′46″N 109°42′58″W, el. 9,626 feet (2,934 m)
- Keyser Brown Lake, 45°05′19″N 109°31′52″W, el. 8,714 feet (2,656 m)
- Kidney Lake, 45°01′25″N 109°38′32″W, el. 9,875 feet (3,010 m)
- Kookoo Lake, 45°07′20″N 109°35′18″W, el. 10,226 feet (3,117 m)
- Lake at Falls, 45°07′22″N 109°42′29″W, el. 8,133 feet (2,479 m)
- Lake Elaine, 45°02′01″N 109°41′00″W, el. 9,265 feet (2,824 m)
- Lake Gertrude, 45°08′22″N 109°29′47″W, el. 9,508 feet (2,898 m)
- Lake Mary, 45°09′08″N 109°33′51″W, el. 9,957 feet (3,035 m)
- Lake of the Clouds, 45°04′30″N 109°46′51″W, el. 9,672 feet (2,948 m)
- Lake of the Winds, 45°04′13″N 109°45′25″W, el. 9,862 feet (3,006 m)
- Lake Susanne, 45°07′16″N 109°38′05″W, el. 10,148 feet (3,093 m)
- Lake Sylvan, 45°11′18″N 109°35′20″W, el. 9,170 feet (2,800 m)
- Lennon Lake, 45°01′34″N 109°42′16″W, el. 9,659 feet (2,944 m)
- Line Lake, 45°00′20″N 109°22′32″W, el. 9,714 feet (2,961 m)
- Little Scat Lake, 45°06′30″N 109°42′51″W, el. 9,314 feet (2,839 m)
- Liver Lake, 45°01′37″N 109°38′11″W, el. 9,865 feet (3,007 m)
- Lonesome Lake, 45°00′12″N 109°35′58″W, el. 10,036 feet (3,059 m)
- Lost Lake, 45°11′40″N 109°41′18″W, el. 9,153 feet (2,790 m)
- Lost Lake, 45°04′49″N 109°30′07″W, el. 8,497 feet (2,590 m)
- Lowary Lake, 45°09′23″N 109°47′38″W, el. 10,312 feet (3,143 m)
- Lower Arch Lake, 45°09′55″N 109°43′20″W, el. 9,554 feet (2,912 m)
- Lower Basin Creek Lake, 45°09′01″N 109°24′47″W, el. 8,389 feet (2,557 m)
- Mariane Lake, 45°03′36″N 109°45′46″W, el. 9,544 feet (2,909 m)
- Marker Lake, 45°06′50″N 109°36′15″W, el. 10,873 feet (3,314 m)
- Martin Lake, 45°01′58″N 109°38′31″W, el. 9,659 feet (2,944 m)
- Martin Lake, 45°06′57″N 109°42′47″W, el. 9,229 feet (2,813 m)
- Maryott Lake, 45°02′54″N 109°37′31″W, el. 10,420 feet (3,180 m)
- Medicine Lake, 45°07′08″N 109°46′13″W, el. 9,905 feet (3,019 m)
- Moon Lake, 45°02′13″N 109°32′13″W, el. 10,387 feet (3,166 m)
- Navajo Tarn, 45°05′05″N 109°38′28″W, el. 10,738 feet (3,273 m)
- North Hidden Lake, 45°01′15″N 109°38′11″W, el. 9,905 feet (3,019 m)
- Nymph Lake, 45°04′11″N 109°47′38″W, el. 9,308 feet (2,837 m)
- Oly Lake, 45°06′35″N 109°46′38″W, el. 9,662 feet (2,945 m)
- Omega Lake, 45°05′30″N 109°37′07″W, el. 10,873 feet (3,314 m)
- Otter Lake, 45°03′12″N 109°44′33″W, el. 9,590 feet (2,920 m)
- Ouzel Lake, 45°04′36″N 109°47′19″W, el. 9,432 feet (2,875 m)
- Pat Lake, 45°01′19″N 109°44′08″W, el. 9,196 feet (2,803 m)
- Picket Lake, 45°03′05″N 109°43′53″W, el. 9,711 feet (2,960 m)
- Planaria Lake, 45°03′27″N 109°43′24″W, el. 10,016 feet (3,053 m)
- Pleiades Lakes, 45°03′13″N 109°38′33″W, el. 9,885 feet (3,013 m)
- Rachel Lake, 45°01′58″N 109°37′51″W, el. 9,859 feet (3,005 m)
- Rainbow Lake, 45°08′06″N 109°41′30″W, el. 7,775 feet (2,370 m)
- Red Rock Lakes, 45°04′57″N 109°44′32″W, el. 10,541 feet (3,213 m)
- Red Storm Lake, 45°01′35″N 109°41′46″W, el. 9,511 feet (2,899 m)
- Rimrock Lake, 45°08′41″N 109°41′14″W, el. 7,641 feet (2,329 m)
- Robble Lake, 45°03′32″N 109°40′36″W, el. 10,148 feet (3,093 m)
- Rock Tree Lake, 45°03′42″N 109°44′37″W, el. 9,800 feet (3,000 m)
- Russell Lake, 45°03′40″N 109°47′25″W, el. 8,750 feet (2,670 m)
- Rydberg Lake, 45°02′37″N 109°27′44″W, el. 9,511 feet (2,899 m)
- Scat Lake, 45°06′39″N 109°42′51″W, el. 9,311 feet (2,838 m)
- Second Rock Lake, 45°04′52″N 109°33′49″W, el. 9,111 feet (2,777 m)
- Senal Lake, 45°08′17″N 109°34′50″W, el. 10,148 feet (3,093 m)
- September Morn Lake, 45°05′53″N 109°32′30″W, el. 9,701 feet (2,957 m)
- Shadow Lake, 45°06′05″N 109°35′09″W, el. 9,580 feet (2,920 m)
- Shadow Lake, 45°11′48″N 109°40′25″W, el. 8,425 feet (2,568 m)
- Sheep Lake, 45°01′06″N 109°33′31″W, el. 10,029 feet (3,057 m)
- Shelf Lake, 45°01′36″N 109°31′17″W, el. 10,164 feet (3,098 m)
- Ship Lake, 45°07′00″N 109°35′44″W, el. 10,466 feet (3,190 m)
- Shrew Lake, 45°01′21″N 109°43′01″W, el. 9,564 feet (2,915 m)
- Shrimp Lake, 45°02′59″N 109°43′24″W, el. 9,701 feet (2,957 m)
- Silt Lakes, 45°05′47″N 109°36′06″W, el. 9,836 feet (2,998 m)
- Silver Run Lakes, 45°07′46″N 109°28′59″W, el. 9,557 feet (2,913 m)
- Silver Tarn, 45°02′45″N 109°35′14″W, el. 10,873 feet (3,314 m)
- Sky Pilot Lake, 45°03′52″N 109°36′19″W, el. 10,482 feet (3,195 m)
- Sliderock Lake, 45°02′16″N 109°30′48″W, el. 10,449 feet (3,185 m)
- Slough Lake, 45°12′21″N 109°40′49″W, el. 7,500 feet (2,300 m)
- Smethurst Lake, 45°02′29″N 109°28′19″W, el. 9,613 feet (2,930 m)
- Snail Lake, 45°03′21″N 109°43′15″W, el. 9,990 feet (3,040 m)
- Snow Lakes, 45°09′01″N 109°38′26″W, el. 9,291 feet (2,832 m)
- Snowbank Lake, 45°04′58″N 109°42′00″W, el. 10,754 feet (3,278 m)
- Snowbank Lake, 45°02′21″N 109°29′37″W, el. 10,082 feet (3,073 m)
- Snowbank Lake, 45°06′01″N 109°45′40″W, el. 10,187 feet (3,105 m)
- Spogen Lake, 45°01′34″N 109°39′00″W, el. 9,583 feet (2,921 m)
- Summerville Lake, 45°02′49″N 109°40′02″W, el. 9,550 feet (2,910 m)
- Summit Lake, 45°06′25″N 109°41′03″W, el. 9,619 feet (2,932 m)
- Sundance Lake, 45°06′35″N 109°34′38″W, el. 9,465 feet (2,885 m)
- Thiel Lake, 45°00′26″N 109°38′41″W, el. 9,186 feet (2,800 m)
- Throop Lake, 45°00′49″N 109°37′53″W, el. 9,780 feet (2,980 m)
- Till Lake, 45°03′35″N 109°41′01″W, el. 10,269 feet (3,130 m)
- Timberline Lake, 45°08′07″N 109°30′22″W, el. 9,623 feet (2,933 m)
- Trail Lake, 45°01′49″N 109°39′10″W, el. 9,757 feet (2,974 m)
- Triangle Lake, 45°07′11″N 109°35′32″W, el. 10,400 feet (3,200 m)
- Triangle Lake, 45°03′26″N 109°44′05″W, el. 9,780 feet (2,980 m)
- Triskele Lake, 45°02′26″N 109°36′25″W, el. 10,187 feet (3,105 m)
- Twin Outlets Lake, 45°06′51″N 109°45′06″W, el. 9,186 feet (2,800 m)
- Two Bits Lake, 45°02′48″N 109°36′13″W, el. 10,216 feet (3,114 m)
- Varve Lake, 45°04′46″N 109°37′58″W, el. 10,466 feet (3,190 m)
- Vogel Lake, 45°06′36″N 109°43′57″W, el. 9,669 feet (2,947 m)
- Wand Lake, 45°03′57″N 109°46′07″W, el. 9,308 feet (2,837 m)
- Whitcomb Lake, 45°01′25″N 109°39′25″W, el. 9,550 feet (2,910 m)
- Widewater Lake, 45°00′39″N 109°46′35″W, el. 8,035 feet (2,449 m)
- Widowed Lake, 45°03′16″N 109°42′41″W, el. 9,990 feet (3,040 m)
- Wild Bill Lake, 45°09′23″N 109°22′12″W, el. 6,768 feet (2,063 m)
- Wright Lake, 45°01′43″N 109°38′43″W, el. 9,632 feet (2,936 m)
- Z Lake, 45°03′51″N 109°44′48″W, el. 9,829 feet (2,996 m)

== Reservoirs ==
- Adams Reservoir, 45°04′18″N 108°40′08″W, el. 4,475 feet (1,364 m)
- Bidstrip Reservoir, 45°13′27″N 109°07′48″W, el. 4,304 feet (1,312 m)
- Cooney Reservoir, 45°26′57″N 109°12′05″W, el. 4,255 feet (1,297 m)
- Cooney Reservoir, 45°26′48″N 109°11′57″W, el. 4,222 feet (1,287 m)
- Depression Reservoir, 45°11′35″N 108°48′47″W, el. 3,947 feet (1,203 m)
- Glacier Lake, 45°00′29″N 109°32′25″W, el. 9,695 feet (2,955 m)
- Glacier Lake, 45°00′18″N 109°31′57″W, el. 9,695 feet (2,955 m)
- Hunters Reservoir, 45°04′18″N 108°50′51″W, el. 4,426 feet (1,349 m)
- Jones Reservoir, 45°04′26″N 108°48′42″W, el. 4,288 feet (1,307 m)
- Monroe Reservoir, 45°06′48″N 109°03′01″W, el. 4,003 feet (1,220 m)
- Shupak Ponds, 45°13′26″N 109°01′24″W, el. 3,881 feet (1,183 m)
- V O Reservoir, 45°05′14″N 109°00′45″W, el. 3,989 feet (1,216 m)

== See also ==
- List of lakes in Montana
