= Wild Bill =

Wild Bill may refer to:

== Places ==
- Wild Bill Lake, a lake in Montana

== People ==
- Wild Bill Hickok (1837–1876), folk hero of the American Old West
- William L. Carlisle (1890–1964), train robber of the American West
- Wild Bill Claiborne (1872–1933), American college football player
- William Contreras (born 1997), Venezuelan baseball player and 2026 World Series MVP
- William Cutolo (1949–1999), New York mobster
- Wild Bill Davis (1918–1995), jazz organist
- Bill Davison (1906–1989), jazz cornet player
- William Edward Donovan (1876–1923), American professional baseball pitcher and manager
- William Joseph Donovan (1883–1959), American soldier, lawyer, and intelligence officer, founder of the precursor to the Central Intelligence Agency
- William O. Douglas (1898–1980), Supreme Court Justice
- Wild Bill Elliott (1904–1965), American actor who specialized in Western film roles
- Bill Elliott (born 1955), 1988 NASCAR Winston Cup Series Champion and twice Daytona 500 winner
- Wild Bill Gelbke (born 1938), American engineer and motorcycle designer
- William Guarnere (1923–2014), American soldier in the 101st Airborne during World War II, made famous by the mini-series Band of Brothers
- Wild Bill Hagy (1939–2007), American baseball fan who led cheers for the Baltimore Orioles
- Bill Hallahan (1902–1981), American baseball pitcher
- William Adams Wild Bill Hickman (1815–1883), frontiersman, ex-Mormon, and purported murderer
- Bill Hickok (American football) (1874–1933), American football player and businessman
- William Dathan Holbert (born 1979), American serial killer
- William Hopson (died 1928), American pilot
- Bill Hunter (ice hockey) (1920–2002), Canadian hockey player, general manager and coach
- Bill Hutchison (baseball) (1859–1926), American baseball pitcher
- Wild Bill Irwin (born 1954), American professional wrestler
- William Karlsson (born 1993), Swedish professional ice hockey player
- William Kocay, Canadian professor and graph theorist
- William Langer (1886–1959), governor and senator from North Dakota
- Bill Longley (gunfighter) (1851–1878), outlaw of the old American West
- Wild Bill Longson (1906–1982), American professional wrestler
- Bill Lovett (c. 1894–1923), Irish-American gangster in New York
- Wild Bill Luhrsen (1884–1973), American baseball pitcher
- Wild Bill Moore (1918–1983), American R&B and jazz saxophone player
- Wild Bill Shrewsberry (born 1938), American drag racer
- Bill Stealey (born 1947), retired U.S. Air Force pilot and computer game producer
- Wild Bill Widner (1867–1908), American baseball pitcher
- Billy Wiles (born 1971), an American professional wrestler

== Arts, entertainment, and media ==
- Wild Bill (G.I. Joe), a fictional character in the G.I. Joe universe
- Wild Bill (1995 film), about the legendary gunfighter
- Wild Bill (2011 film), directorial debut of English actor Dexter Fletcher
- Wild Bill (TV series), a 2019 ITV television series
