= Greenough =

Greenough may refer to:

- Greenough (surname), people with the surname Greenough
- Greenough, Western Australia, a historic town
- Greenough, an unincorporated community in Missoula County, Montana, U.S.
- Greenough Lake, a lake in Montana
- Greenough River, a river in Western Australia
- Shire of Greenough, a former local government area in Western Australia
- Electoral district of Greenough, a former electorate of the Western Australian Legislative Assembly
