= Atherton Blight =

Philadelphia lawyer and philanthropist

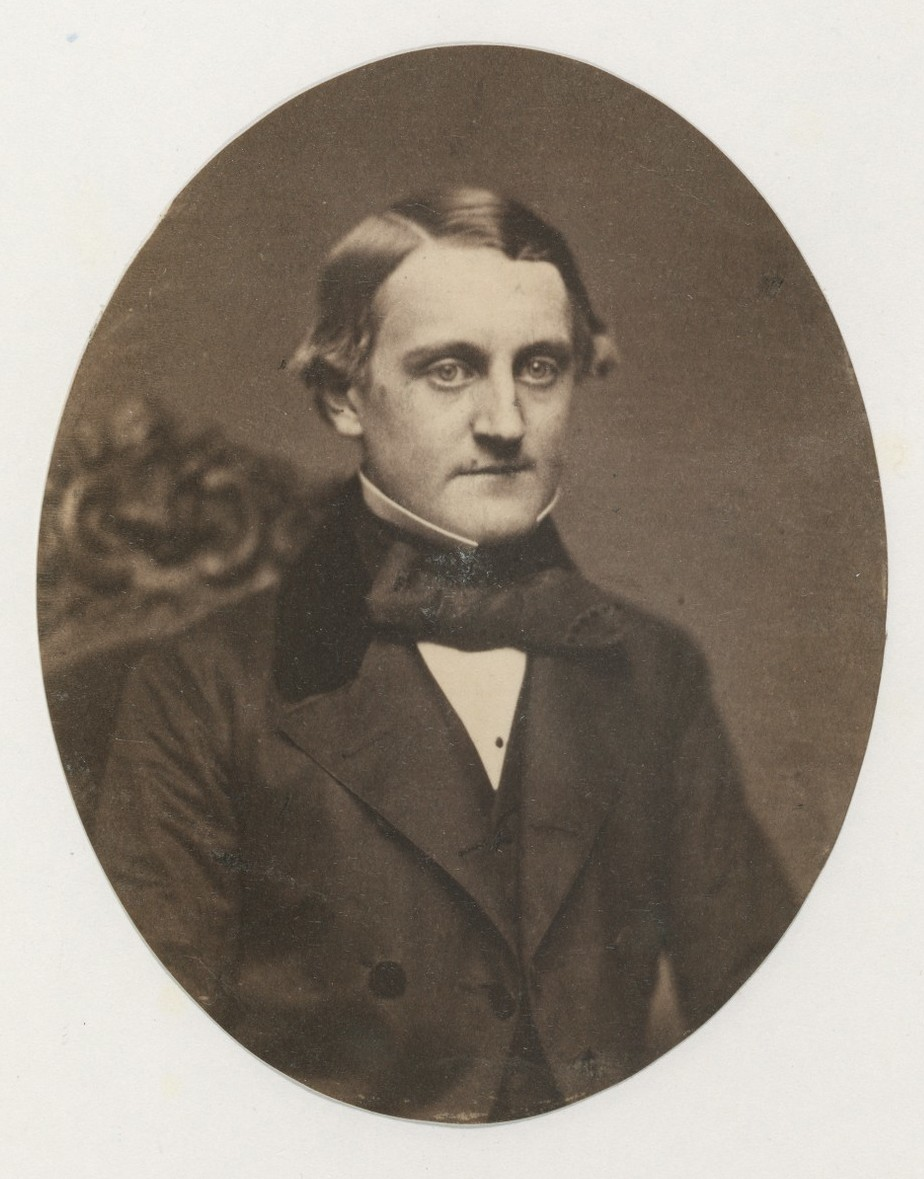
- Born: November 10, 1834; Philadelphia, United States
- Died: November 4, 1909 (aged 74); Newport, Rhode Island, U.S.
- Occupations: Lawyer, author, diarist and philanthropist
- Spouse: Anna Loring "Nina" Greenough (m. 1847–1897)
- Children: 3
- Relatives: Richard Saltonstall Greenough (father in law)

Atherton Blight (November 10, 1834 – November 4, 1909) was a Philadelphia lawyer, businessman, author, diarist, and philanthropist who traveled extensively in the middle of the 19th century to Europe and southwest Asia. Blight was also a founding member of the Art Club of Philadelphia, a major stockholder in the Newport Casino, and a member of the millionaires club of the Gilded Age.

== Early life and career ==
Blight was born in Philadelphia, the son of George James Blight (1772–1836) and Maria Gillingham (1798–1865). He descended from a long line of Philadelphia merchants and lawyers. It is known that he was named in honor of a Philadelphia lawyer, and relative, Humphrey Atherton (1788–1845). Blight was born to immense wealth and privilege. His father died shortly before his birth, and as one of his 5 surviving children the younger Blight received a share of the paternal estate, totaling almost US$123,000. This was equivalent to US$4,498,653 As of 2024.

Blight attended school in Philadelphia, and was interested in the arts and music. He was a regular Shakespearean enthusiast at the home of William Henry Furness, whose son Horace Howard Furness was a close friend and a fellow Harvard scholar. They were roommates at Harvard. He had a series of musical essays published during this period in New York City.

He graduated from Harvard University in 1854. As a young man in his twenties, Blight traveled extensively overseas. At the age of 20, he embarked on a two-year cultural tour of Europe accompanied by Horace, initially to London in October 1854, and then onto Paris. He subsequently met up with a fellow Harvard alumni James Savage Jnr. He immersed himself into the German and Austrian culture. Inspired by this time in Aigen, Salzburg, he purchased Erdenheim Farm in Montgomery County, Pennsylvania in 1855, however he did not return to sign the deed, and nominated a third party. His sister died shortly afterwards. Again he chose not to return home to Philadelphia, choosing to continue his journey into Spain, and onto the Levantine region and Egypt. After Turkey and Crimea, he traveled to Greece and Corfu, then a British protectorate. He kept a travel diary of his extensive tour of Europe, the Middle East and Crimea, which took place between 1855 and 1856. Whilst in Jerusalem, he visited Warder Cresson, a former Quaker, also from Philadelphia, who converted to Judaism and became an early Zionist after having been appointed as the first U.S. Consul to Jerusalem in 1844. It's unsure when he returned to the U.S., however he received his Bachelor of Arts from Harvard in 1858.

Although a farm proprietor, Blight was not inclined to dedicate himself to a career in farming, instead preferring the intricacies of law. He was admitted to the Pennsylvania Bar Association in 1859. Erdenheim farm was sold to Aristides Welch during October 1862 and subsequently this farm became notable for the breeding of racing horses. During the American Civil War he served as one of the directors of the United States Sanitary Commission, a private relief agency created by federal legislation on June 18, 1861, to support sick and wounded soldiers, with Blight having access to General George B. McClellan. Blight's understanding and exposure to the British Sanitary Commission, which had been set up during the Crimean War (1853–1856) informed the setting up of its US counterpart. He also served in a committee promoting recruitment of minorities during 1863. After the American Civil War he was involved with the Freedmen's Bureau.

His philanthropic causes in Philadelphia revolved around the needs of war veterans and the sanitary requirements of a fast-growing city. He was pivotal in a number of infrastructure improvements that would benefit all the inhabitants of the city. He was a member of the Philadelphia Fountain Society. He also served as treasurer for various good causes.

Once Blight had started a family in the mid-1870s, he joined the set of wealthy families who were drawn to Newport, Rhode Island in the summers. It became an annual pilgrimage given that the fresh sea breeze appealed to those who could afford it. Eventually it became his primary residence.

== Legacy ==
The Atherton Blight papers (1849–1858) are held by the Historical Society of Pennsylvania. These contain a collection of correspondence, including travel diaries and a book of travel expenses. In his personal diary he describes the battlefields and veterans of the Crimean War, which had ended in February 1856. His correspondence with Charles Eliot Norton is held by the Houghton Library.

The National Portrait Gallery in Washington D.C. has a marble sculpture of him from 1878 by Richard Saltonstall Greenough (1819–1904). Greenough's best-known work is probably a statue of Benjamin Franklin which stood in front of the Old City Hall (Boston). Greenough's daughter caught the attention of Blight during his visit to Europe and they eventually married. Greenough lived most of his later adult life in Rome.

Blight was an avid art and book collector. He was also a donor and patron of the arts. In 1890 he presented or bequeathed the painting Orestes Pursued by the Furies by William-Adolphe Bouguereau. As of 2021 it forms part of the Chrysler Museum of Art collection. In addition to keeping a personal diary, he authored a number of articles, including "The Critical, Reflective Period" in 1901.

His granddaughter's second husband was Roger Marie Vincent Philippe Lévêque de Vilmorin, the illegitimate son of Alfonso XIII.

== Personal ==
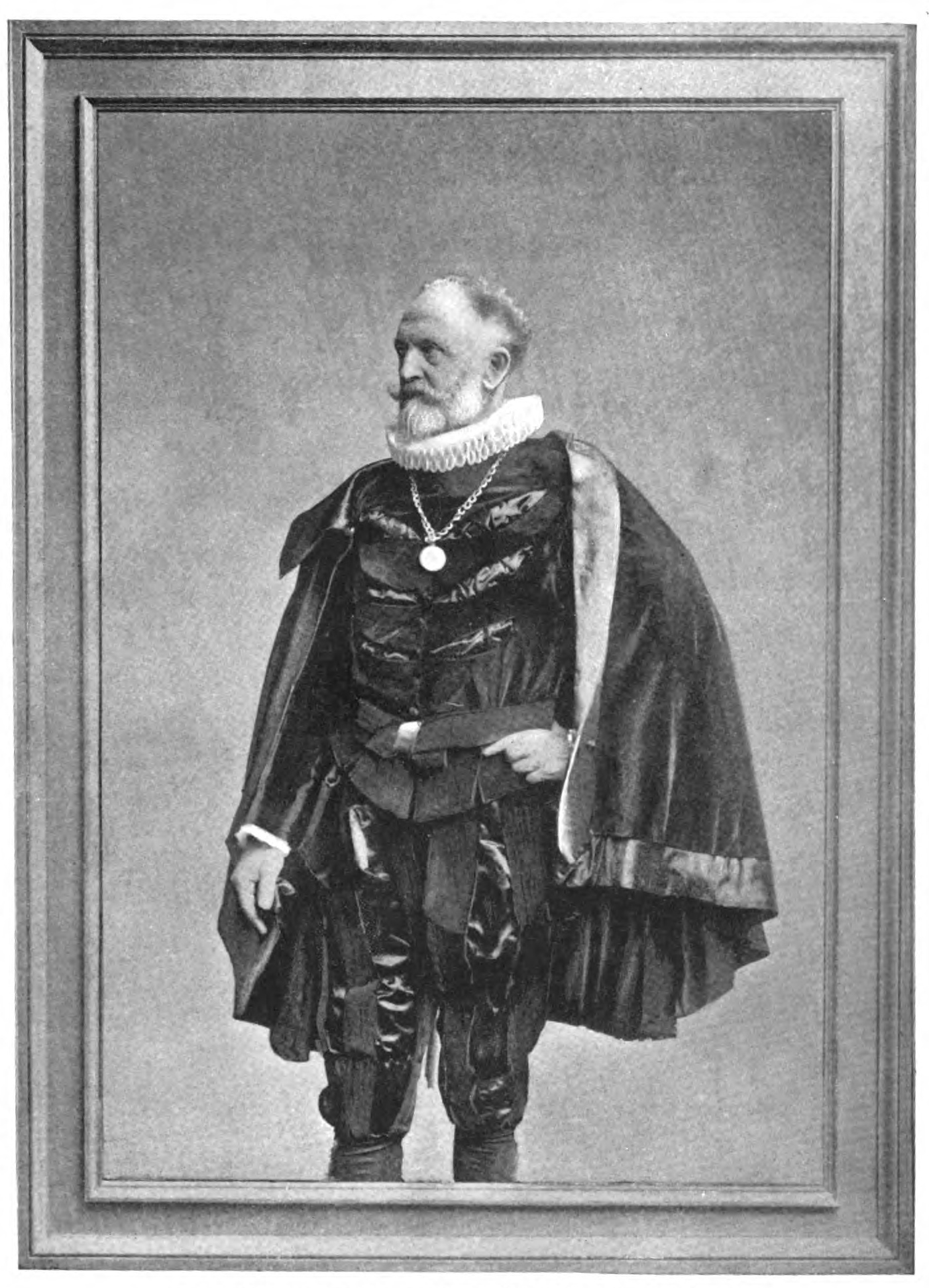
Atherton Blight in tableau vivant as Rubens's portrait of Henri IV of France, 1891

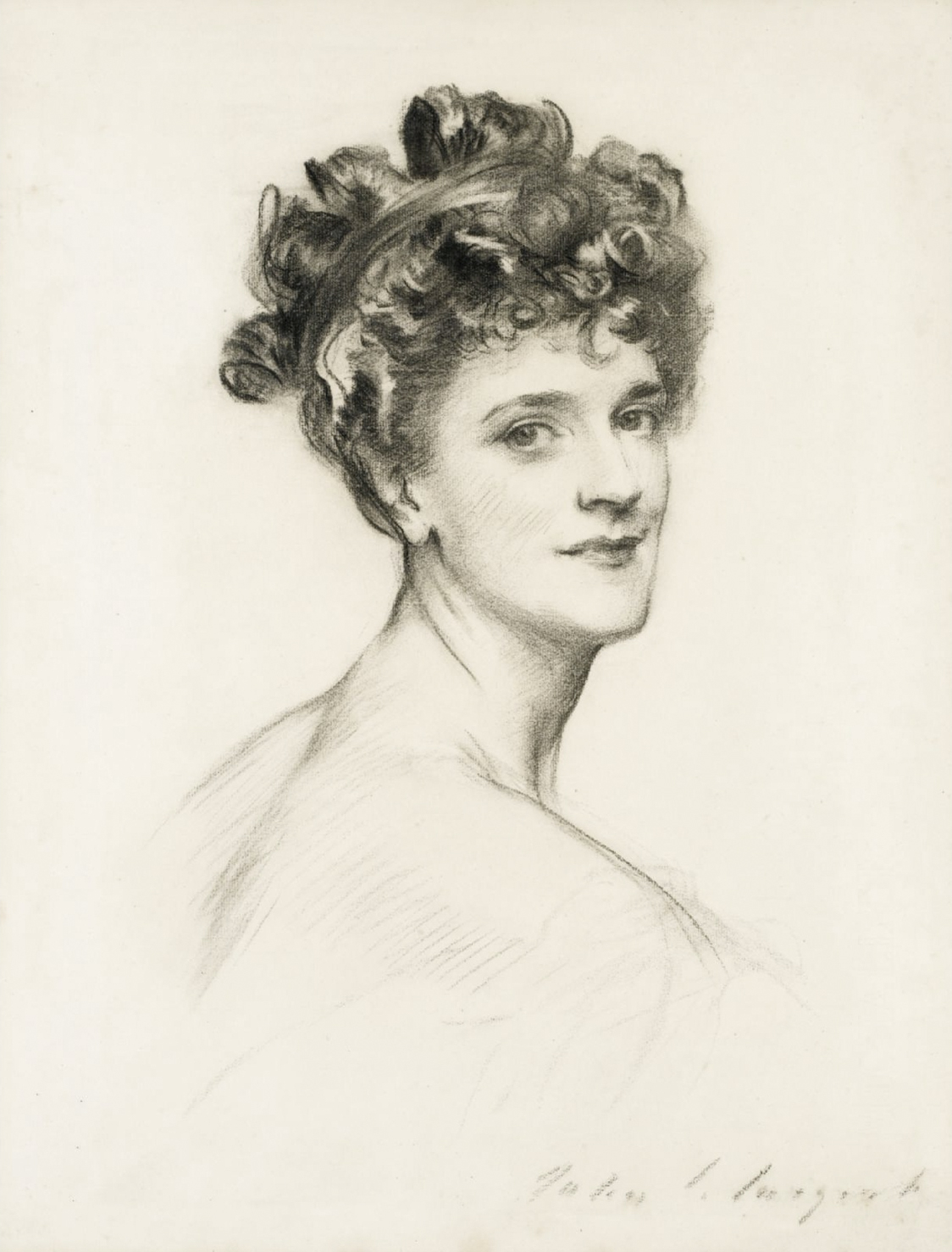
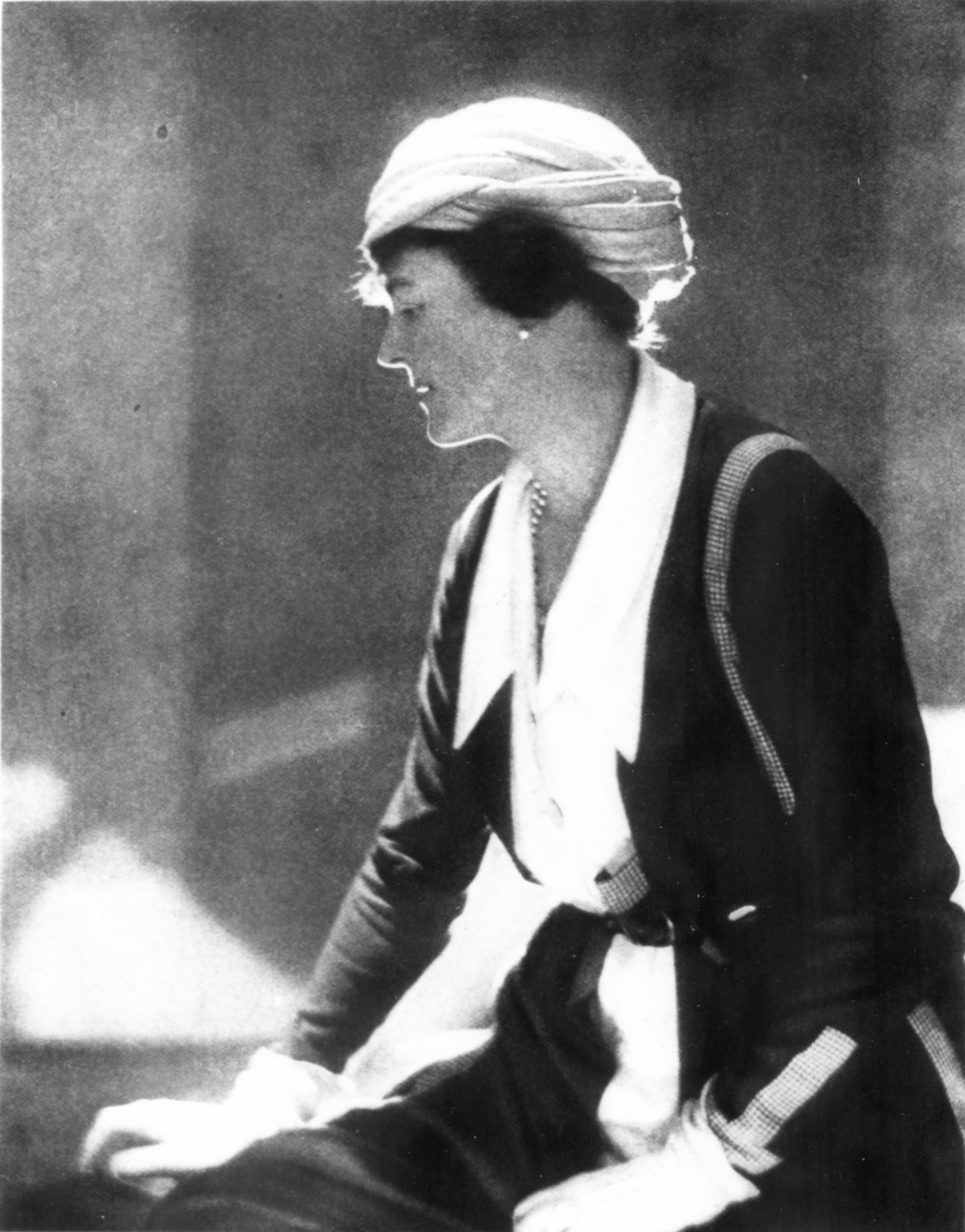
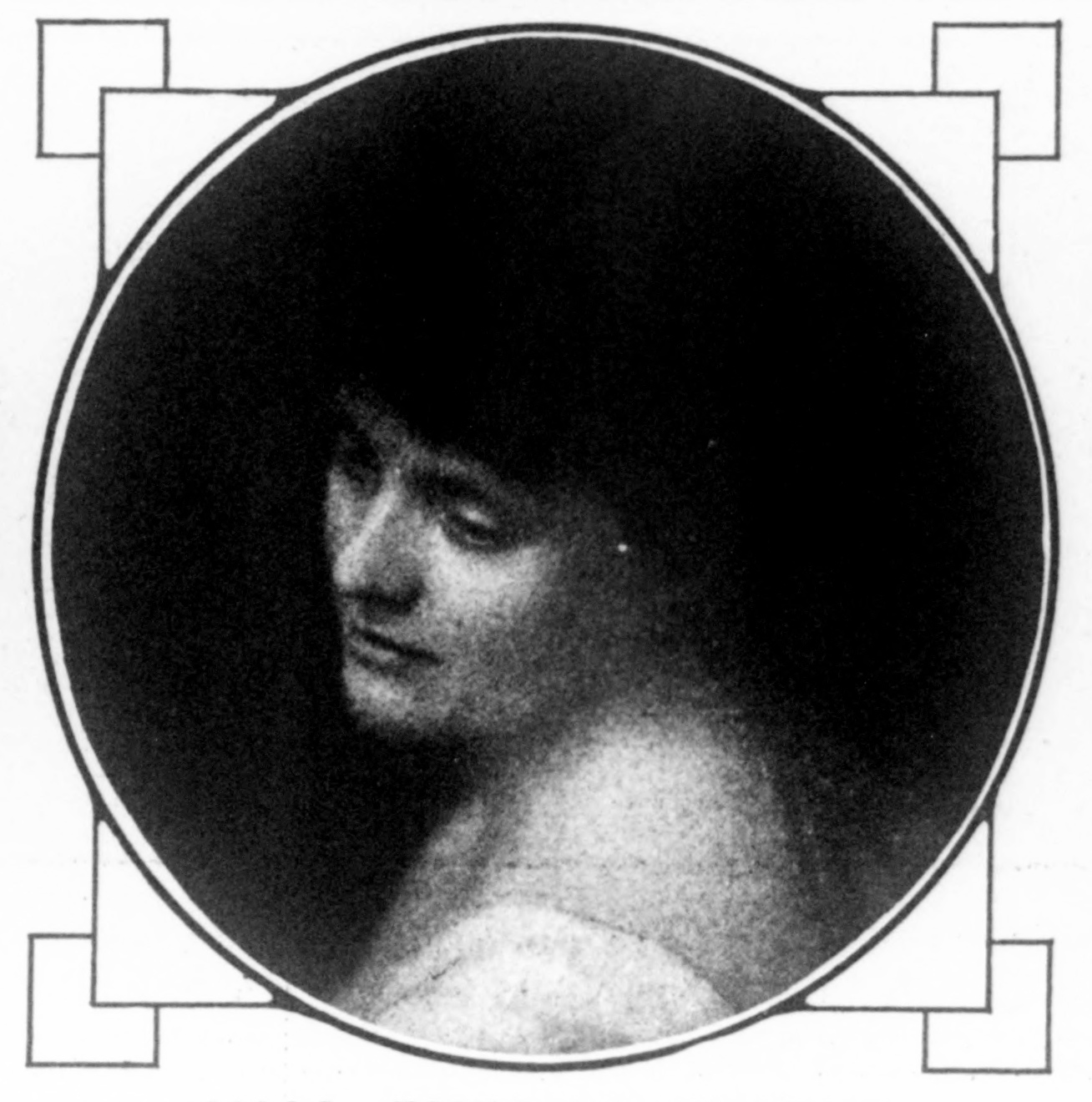
Blight's three daughters:, Alice, Edith, and Evelyn

His mother died in 1865. In 1872 at the age of 38, he married Anna Loring "Nina" Greenough (1847–1897), the daughter of sculptor Richard Saltonstall Greenough who was 13 years his junior. They had three daughters. Some were born in Europe. His daughter Evelyn was often confused with being British because of her intonation when speaking. This was due to the numbers of years she spent in Europe and British nannies.

Blight purchased "Shady Nook", a cottage in Newport from Charlotte D. Hardy in 1876 and settled permanently at a home on Bellevue Avenue Historic District in Newport in 1880, the same year the Newport Casino opened to its first patrons and subsequently became the center of social life during the Gilded Age.

In 1893 he and his sisters were described as amongst the most popular younger set in Newport that summer.

On September 1, 1897, his daughter Edith Blight married William Payne Thompson, from a wealthy family from Westbury, Long Island.

A month later, on October 12, 1897, his wife committed suicide with a pistol shortly after a nurse visit. She had had pulmonary tuberculosis for the last 15 years of her life. Blight never remarried and spent more time in Europe, with summers in Newport, taking part in prominent society there.

His daughter, Alice Atherton Blight was a frequent feature in society magazines.

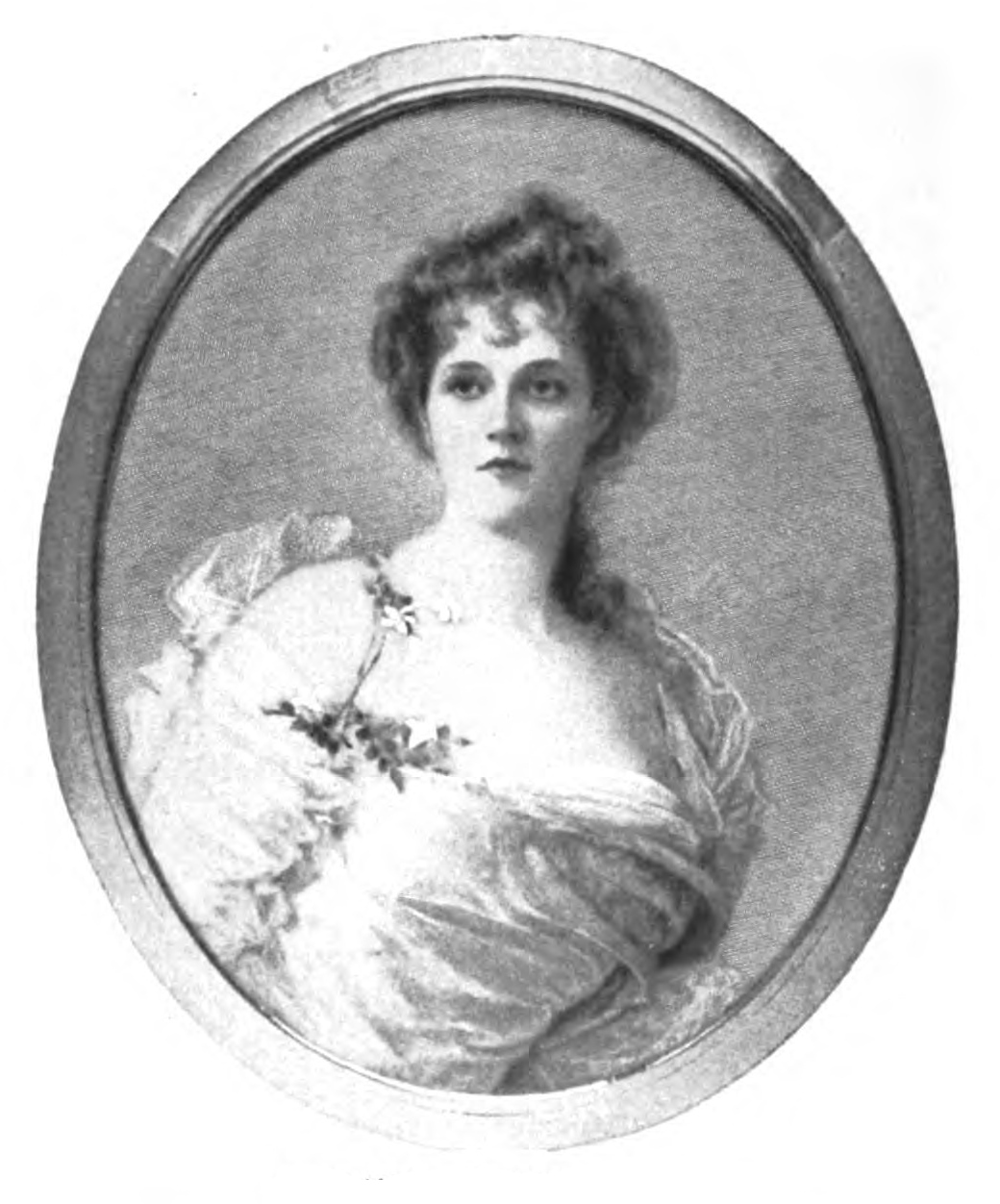
Miss Alice Atherton Blight - Cosmopolitan Magazine, August 1899 edition

Alice married Sir Gerard Augustus Lowther, 1st Baronet (1858–1916) after a 3-year engagement in 1905. Lowther at the time was the British Ambassador to the Ottoman Empire. Pictures of his daughter form part of the National Portrait Gallery, London. Alice was etched by the artist John Singer Sargent in 1905.

In 1906, his daughter, Evelyn Blight, referred to in newspapers as the "wild rose beauty", married Mahlon Allanson Sands, the younger brother of Ethel Sands, a former Newport summer neighbor, son of the late Mahlon Day Sands, the former Secretary of the American Free Trade Movement, who was accidentally killed in London in 1888. The Sands former Newport residence, Lands End, had changed hands several times, including Robert Livingston Beeckman, and at the time of marriage was in the hands of Edith Wharton.

By 1907, Blight had acquired 89–95 Webster St, Newport, located near the corner of Bellevue Avenue. This property adjoined his own residence, Shady Nook. Known as the Frank W. Andrews Residence, it was previously owned by Augustus Whiting (1796–1873), a Merchant of New York & New Orleans.

Blight was one of the best-known millionaires of American Society of the Gilded Age, died of heart failure on November 8, 1909. His final years coincided with widespread social activism and a desire for political reform, marking the start of the Progressive Era. He is buried in Island Cemetery, Newport, Rhode Island. His obituary was published in the New York Times. Items of his estate were auctioned in 1911.
