= Efim Zelmanov =

Russian-American mathematician (born 1955)

- Ефим Зельманов
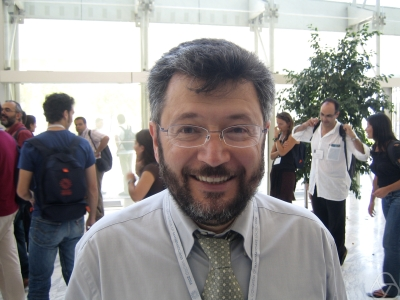
- Born: Efim Isaakovich Zelmanov; September 7, 1955 (age 71); Khabarovsk, Russian SFSR, Soviet Union
- Education: Novosibirsk State University; Leningrad State University
- Known for: Nonassociative algebra
- Awards: Fields Medal (1994)
- Scientific career
- Fields: Mathematics
- Workplaces: University of Wisconsin–Madison; University of Chicago; Yale University; University of California, San Diego; Southern University of Science and Technology
- Doctoral students: Martin Kassabov

Efim Isaakovich Zelmanov (Russian: Ефи́м Исаа́кович Зе́льманов; born 7 September 1955) is a Russian-American mathematician, known for his work on combinatorial problems in nonassociative algebra and group theory, including his solution of the restricted Burnside problem. He was awarded a Fields Medal at the International Congress of Mathematicians in Zürich in 1994.

== Biography ==
Zelmanov was born on 7 September 1955 into a Jewish family in Khabarovsk. He entered Novosibirsk State University in 1972, when he was 17 years old. He obtained a doctoral degree at Novosibirsk State University in 1980, and a higher degree at Leningrad State University in 1985. He had a position in Novosibirsk until 1987, when he left the Soviet Union.

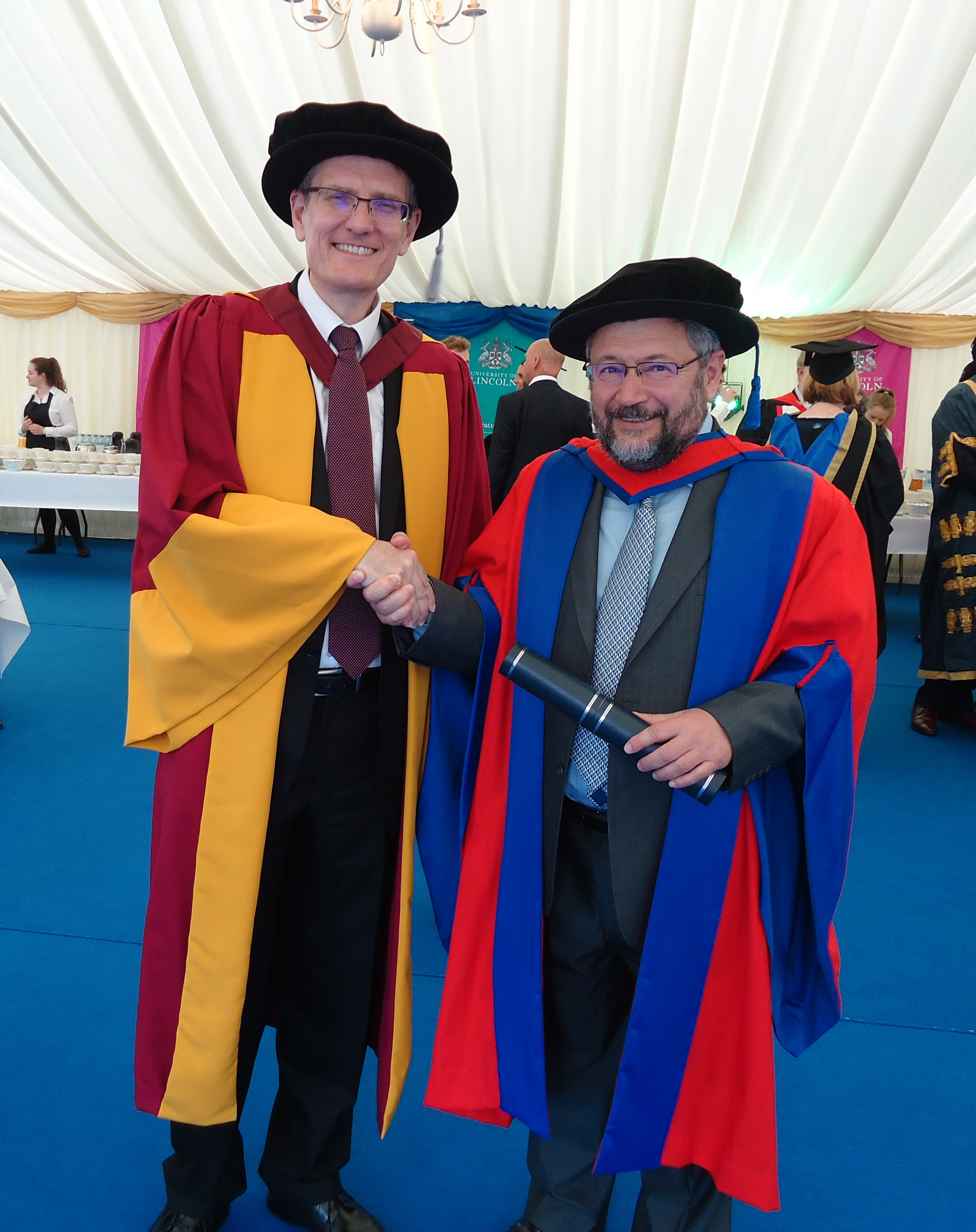
Efim Zelmanov (right) with the University of Lincoln (UK) Deputy Vice-Chancellor Professor Andrew Hunter (left) after receiving Honorary DSc degree. 5th September 2016, Lincoln, UK.

In 1990, he moved to the United States, becoming a professor at the University of Wisconsin–Madison. He was at the University of Chicago in 1994/5, then at Yale University. In 1996, he became a Distinguished Professor at the Korea Institute for Advanced Study and in 2002, he became a professor at the University of California, San Diego. In 2011 he got hon DSc from QUB (Belfast)

In 2022, he moved to the People's Republic of China and joined the Southern University of Science and Technology in Shenzhen, China. He served as a chair professor and the scientific director of the SUSTech International Center for Mathematics.

Zelmanov was elected a member of the U.S. National Academy of Sciences in 2001, becoming, at the age of 47, the youngest member of the mathematics section of the academy. He is also an elected member of the American Academy of Arts and Sciences (1996) and a foreign member of the Korean Academy of Science and Technology and of the Spanish Royal Academy of Sciences. In 2012, he became a fellow of the American Mathematical Society.

Zelmanov gave invited talks at the International Congress of Mathematicians in Warsaw (1983), Kyoto (1990) and Zurich (1994). He delivered the 2004 Turán Memorial Lectures. He was awarded Honorary Doctor degrees from the University of Hagen, Germany (1997), the University of Alberta, Canada (2011), Taras Shevchenko National University of Kyiv, Ukraine (2012), the Universidad Internacional Menéndez Pelayo in Santander, Spain (2015), the University of Lincoln, UK (2016), and the Vrije Universiteit Brussel, Belgium (2023).

Zelmanov's early work was on Jordan algebras in the case of infinite dimensions. He was able to show that Glennie's identity in a certain sense generates all identities that hold. He then showed that the Engel identity for Lie algebras implies nilpotence, in the case of infinite dimensions.

== Notable publications ==
- Zelʹmanov, E.I. Solution of the restricted Burnside problem for groups of odd exponent. Izv. Akad. Nauk SSSR Ser. Mat. 54 (1990), no. 1, 42–59, 221. English translation in Math. USSR-Izv. 36 (1991), no. 1, 41–60. doi:10.1070/IM1991v036n01ABEH001946
- Zelʹmanov, E.I. Solution of the restricted Burnside problem for 2-groups. Mat. Sb. 182 (1991), no. 4, 568–592. English translation in Math. USSR-Sb. 72 (1992), no. 2, 543–565. doi:10.1070/SM1992v072n02ABEH001272
