= Mircea Mustață =

Romanian-American mathematician

Mircea Immanuel Mustață
- Education: UC Berkeley (Ph.D.); University of Bucharest
- Scientific career
- Fields: Mathematics
- Workplaces: Michigan (2004–); Institute for Advanced Study (2006–2011)
- Thesis: Singularities and Jet Schemes (2001)
- Doctoral advisor: David Eisenbud
- Doctoral students: June Huh

Mircea Immanuel Mustață ([mir.'tʃa musˈta.t͡sə]; born 1971) is a Romanian-American mathematician, specializing in algebraic geometry.

== Background ==
Mustață was born in Romania. He received a bachelor's degree in 1995 and a master's degree the following year, both from the University of Bucharest. For his doctorate, Mustață moved to the United States, obtaining his PhD from UC Berkeley in 2001. His thesis, Singularities and Jet Schemes, was advised by David Eisenbud.

A Clay Research Fellow during 2001–04, Mustață held postdoc positions at the University of Nice Sophia Antipolis (Fall 2001), the Isaac Newton Institute (Spring 2002), and Harvard University (2002–04).

Since 2004, when he became an associate professor, Mustață has been on the faculty of the University of Michigan in Ann Arbor. He was made a full professor by Michigan in 2008. In fall 2006, he was at the Institute for Advanced Study. From 2006 to 2011, he held a five-year Packard Fellowship.

Mustață was an invited speaker at the 2004 European Mathematical Congress in Stockholm and at the 2014 International Congress of Mathematicians in Seoul.

His doctoral students include Fields medalist June Huh.

== Research ==
Mustață's research deals with a wide range of topics in algebraic geometry, including:

various invariants of singularities of algebraic varieties, such as minimal log discrepancies, log canonical thresholds, multiplier ideals, Bernstein–Sato polynomials and F-thresholds ... resolutions of singularities, jet schemes, D-modules or positive characteristic methods ... birational geometry, asymptotic base loci and invariants of divisors, and toric varieties.

== Selected publications ==
- Ein, Lawrence; Lazarsfeld, Robert; Mustaţă, Mircea; Nakamaye, Michael; Popa, Mihnea (2006). "Asymptotic invariants of base loci". Annales de l'Institut Fourier. 56 (6): 1701–1734. arXiv:math/0308116. Bibcode:2003math......8116E. doi:10.5802/aif.2225. S2CID 33125067.
- Ein, Lawrence; Mustaţă, Mircea (2009). "Jet schemes and singularities". Algebraic geometry—Seattle 2005. Part 2. Proceedings of Symposia in Pure Mathematics. Vol. 80. Providence, RI: American Mathematical Society. pp. 505–546. arXiv:math/0612862. doi:10.1090/pspum/080.2/2483946. ISBN 978-0-8218-4703-9. MR 2483946. S2CID 14119380.
- Budur, Nero; Mustaţă, Mircea; Saito, Morihiko (2006). "Bernstein-Sato polynomials of arbitrary varieties". Compositio Mathematica. 142 (3): 779–797. arXiv:math/0408408. Bibcode:2004math......8408B. doi:10.1112/s0010437x06002193. S2CID 6955564.
- Mustaţă, Mircea; Payne, Sam (2005). "Ehrhart polynomials and stringy Betti numbers". Mathematische Annalen. 333 (4): 787–795. arXiv:math/0504486. Bibcode:2005math......4486M. doi:10.1007/s00208-005-0691-x. S2CID 119118251.
- Mustaţă, Mircea; Takagi, Shunsuke; Watanabe, Kei-ichi (2004). "F-thresholds and Bernstein-Sato polynomials". In Laptev, Ari (ed.). European Congress of Mathematics: Stockholm, June 27-July 2, 2004. European Mathematical Society. pp. 341–364. arXiv:math/0411170. Bibcode:2004math.....11170M. ISBN 978-3-03719-009-8.
- Ein, Lawrence; Mustaţǎ, Mircea (2004). "Inversion of adjunction for local complete intersection varieties". American Journal of Mathematics. 126 (6): 1355–1365. arXiv:math/0301164. Bibcode:2003math......1164E. doi:10.1353/ajm.2004.0044. S2CID 17363166.
- Mustaţǎ, Mircea; Popa, Mihnea (2016). "Hodge ideals". arXiv:1605.08088 [math.AG].

== Personal life ==
Mustață currently resides in Ann Arbor, Michigan, with his wife, Olga, and daughter, Maya. His hobbies include hiking, reading, and playing board games.
