= Principles of Mathematical Analysis =

Textbook

- Third edition
- Author: Walter Rudin
- Language: English
- Subject: Real analysis
- Genre: Textbook
- Published: 1953
- Publisher: McGraw Hill

Principles of Mathematical Analysis, colloquially known as PMA or Baby Rudin, is an introductory mathematical analysis textbook written by Walter Rudin. Initially published by McGraw Hill in 1953, it is one of the most famous mathematics textbooks ever written. It is on the list of 173 books essential for undergraduate math libraries. It earned Rudin the Leroy P. Steele Prize for Mathematical Exposition in 1993. It is referenced several times in Imre Lakatos's book Proofs and Refutations, where it is described as "outstandingly good within the deductivist tradition."

== History ==
As a C. L. E. Moore instructor, Rudin taught the real analysis course at MIT in the 1951–1952 academic year. After he commented to W. T. Martin, who served as a consulting editor for McGraw Hill, that there were no textbooks covering the course material in a satisfactory manner, Martin suggested Rudin write one himself. After completing an outline and a sample chapter, he received a contract from McGraw Hill. He completed the manuscript in the spring of 1952, and it was published the year after. Rudin noted that in writing his textbook, his purpose was "to present a beautiful area of mathematics in a well-organized readable way, concisely, efficiently, with complete and correct proofs. It was an aesthetic pleasure to work on it."

The text was revised twice: first in 1964 (second edition) and then in 1976 (third edition). It has been translated into several languages, including Russian, Chinese, Spanish, French, German, Italian, Greek, Persian, Portuguese, and Polish.

== Contents ==
Rudin's text was the first modern English text on classical real analysis, and its organization of topics has been frequently imitated. In Chapter 1, he constructs the real and complex numbers and outlines their properties. (In the third edition, the Dedekind cut construction is sent to an appendix for pedagogical reasons.) Chapter 2 discusses the topological properties of the real numbers as a metric space. The rest of the text covers topics such as continuous functions, differentiation, the Riemann–Stieltjes integral, and sequences and series of functions (in particular uniform convergence); and outlines examples such as power series, the exponential and logarithmic functions, the fundamental theorem of algebra, and Fourier series. After this single-variable treatment, Rudin goes into detail about real analysis in more than one dimension, with discussion of the implicit and inverse function theorems, differential forms, the generalized Stokes theorem, and the Lebesgue integral.
