= Ronald C. Read =

British mathematician (1924–2019)

R. C. Read
- Born: Ronald Cedric Read; 19 December 1924; Croydon, England
- Died: 7 January 2019 (aged 94); Oakville, Ontario, Canada
- Citizenship: British
- Education: University of Cambridge and University of London
- Scientific career
- Fields: Graph theory
- Workplaces: University of Waterloo
- Doctoral students: Jorge Urrutia and William Lawrence Kocay

Ronald Cedric Read (19 December 1924 – 7 January 2019) was a British mathematician, latterly a professor emeritus of mathematics at the University of Waterloo, Canada. He published many books and papers, primarily on enumeration of graphs, graph isomorphism, chromatic polynomials, and particularly, the use of computers in graph-theoretical research. Read's conjecture was proved after more than 40 years by June Huh in 2009. A majority of Read's later work was done in Waterloo. Read received his Ph.D. (1959) in graph theory from the University of London.

== Life and career ==
Ronald Read served in the Royal Navy during World War II, then completed a degree in mathematics at the University of Cambridge before joining the University College of the West Indies (later the University of the West Indies) in Jamaica as the second founding member of the Mathematics Department there. In 1970 he moved his family to Canada to take up a post as Professor of Mathematics at the University of Waterloo, Ontario, Canada.

While in Jamaica he became interested in cave exploration, and in 1957 he founded the Jamaica Caving Club.

He had a lifelong interest in the making of string figures and is the inventor of the Olympic Flag String Figure.

He was an accomplished musician and played many instruments including violin, viola, cello, double bass, piano, guitar, lute, and many early music instruments, some of which he also built. He had diplomas in Theory and in Composition from the Royal Conservatory of Music in Toronto, Canada, and composed four works for orchestra and several pieces for smaller groups. Read died in January 2019 at the age of 94.

== Selected papers ==
- An Introduction to Chromatic Polynomials. Journal of Combinatorial Theory 4 (1968) 52–71.
- Every One A Winner; or How to avoid isomorphism search when cataloguing combinatorial configurations. Annals of Discrete Mathematics 2, North-Holland Publishing Company (1978) 107–120.
- (With P. Rosenstiehl) On the Principal Edge Tripartition of a Graph. Annals of Discrete Mathematics 3, North-Holland Publishing Company, (1978) 195–226.
- (With W. T. Tutte), Chromatic Polynomials. Selected Topics in Graph Theory, Vol. 3 (1988) 15–42.
- (With C. D. Wright), Computing With Three-Colourable Graphs: a Survey, Ars Combin. Vol 29 (1990) 225–234.
- (with G. F. Royle) Chromatic Roots of Families of Graphs. Graph Theory, Combinatorics and Applications. John Wiley (1991) 1009–1029
- Prospects for Graph-theoretical Algorithms. Annals of Discrete Mathematics 55 (1993) 201–210.

== Books ==
- Read, Ronald C. (1965). Tangrams : 330 puzzles. New York: Dover Publications, Inc. ISBN 0-486-21483-4. OCLC 1136293.
- Read, Ronald C. (1972). A mathematical background for economists and social scientists. Englewood Cliffs, N.J.: Prentice-Hall. ISBN 0-13-560987-9. OCLC 327336.
- Read, Ronald C. (1972). Graph theory and computing. Claude Berge. New York: Academic Press. ISBN 0-12-583850-6. OCLC 525261.
- Pólya, G.; Read, Ronald C. (1987). Combinatorial Enumeration of Groups, Graphs, and Chemical Compounds. New York, NY: Springer New York. ISBN 978-1-4612-4664-0. OCLC 840279750.
- Read, Ronald C.; Wilson, Robin J. (1998). An atlas of graphs. Robin J. Wilson. Oxford: Clarendon Press. ISBN 0-19-853289-X. OCLC 40647141.

== See also ==
- List of University of Waterloo people
