= Mihnea =

Mihnea is a Romanian-language masculine given name that may refer to:

- Mihnea cel Rău
- Mihnea Turcitul
- Mihnea III
- Mihnea Chioveanu
- Mihnea Motoc
- Mihnea-Ion Năstase
- Mihnea Popa
