= Greenough (surname) =

Greenough is an English surname. Notable people with the surname include:

- Bobby Greenough, English rugby league footballer of the 1950s and 1960s
- Gail Greenough (born 1960), Canadian equestrian
- George Greenough, surfer and cinematographer
- George Bellas Greenough (1778–1855), English geologist
- Horatio Greenough (1805–1852), American sculptor
- James Bradstreet Greenough (1833–1901), American classical scholar
- James C. Greenough (1829-1924), American educator
- Louis Greenough (1853–1932), American pioneer of South Dakota
- Peter Greenough (1917–2006), American journalist
- Richard Saltonstall Greenough (1819–1904), American sculptor
- Ricky Greenough (born 1961), English footballer
- Sarah Dana Greenough (1827–1885), American novelist
