= Mimi Dai =

Mathematician

- Education: University of California, Santa Cruz
- Scientific career
- Fields: Mathematics
- Doctoral advisor: Maria Elena Schonbek
- Website: sites.google.com/view/mimidai/home

Mimi Dai is a mathematician who specializes in partial differential equations, fluid dynamics, and complex fluids. She is a professor at the University of Illinois Chicago.

== Education and career ==
Dai received her PhD in applied mathematics from the University of California, Santa Cruz in 2012. Her dissertation, Nematic liquid crystal systems and magneto-hydrodynamics system: The properties of their solutions, was supervised by her advisor, Maria E. Schonbek. She is currently a professor in the Department of Mathematics, Statistics, and Computer Science at the University of Illinois Chicago. She specializes in partial differential equations, fluid dynamics, complex fluids.

== Awards and honors ==
Dai became an American Mathematical Society (AMS) Centennial Fellow in 2022. In 2021 Dai also became an Institute for Advanced Study (IAS) von Neuman Fellow in 2021. Dai has been an IAS Scholar since 2022. In 2018 Dai was awarded a National Science Foundation (NSF) grant for Mathematical Studies of Magnetohydrodynamic Flows with Hall Effect, and another grant from the NSF for Mathematical Analysis of Magnetohydrodynamic Flows with Hall Effect in 2020.
