= Patricia E. Bauman =

American mathematician at Purdue University

Patricia E. Bauman is an American mathematician who studies partial differential equations that model the behavior of liquid crystals and superconductors. She is a professor of mathematics at Purdue University.

== Education and career ==
Bauman received her Ph.D. from the University of Minnesota in 1982, under the supervision of Eugene Fabes; her dissertation was Properties of Non-Negative Solutions of Second-Order Elliptic Equations and their Adjoints. She was a postdoctoral researcher at the Courant Institute of Mathematical Sciences and a C. L. E. Moore instructor of mathematics at the Massachusetts Institute of Technology before joining the Purdue University faculty.

== Recognition ==
Bauman was given an AMS Centennial Fellowship for 1994 to 1995. In 2012, Bauman became a fellow of the American Mathematical Society.

She was elected chair of the Society for Industrial and Applied Mathematics Activity Group on Mathematical Aspects of Materials Science (SIAG/MS) for 2017–2019. She is a former AMS Council member at large.
