= Walter Rudin =

American mathematician (1921–2010)

- Born: May 2, 1921; Vienna, Austria
- Died: May 20, 2010 (aged 89); Madison, Wisconsin, U.S.
- Citizenship: United States
- Education: Duke University (B.A. 1947, Ph.D. 1949)
- Known for: Mathematics textbooks; contributions to harmonic analysis and complex analysis
- Spouse: Mary Ellen Rudin
- Awards: American Mathematical Society Leroy P. Steele Prize for Mathematical Exposition (1993)
- Scientific career
- Fields: Mathematics
- Workplaces: Massachusetts Institute of Technology; University of Wisconsin–Madison
- Doctoral advisor: John Jay Gergen
- Doctoral students: Charles Dunkl; Daniel Rider

Walter Rudin (May 2, 1921 – May 20, 2010) was an Austrian-American mathematician and professor of mathematics at the University of Wisconsin–Madison.

In addition to his contributions to complex and harmonic analysis, Rudin was known for his mathematical analysis textbooks: Principles of Mathematical Analysis, Real and Complex Analysis, and Functional Analysis. Rudin wrote Principles of Mathematical Analysis only two years after obtaining his Ph.D. from Duke University, while he was a C. L. E. Moore Instructor at MIT. Principles, acclaimed for its elegance and clarity, has since become a standard textbook for introductory real analysis courses in the United States.

Rudin's analysis textbooks have also been influential in mathematical education worldwide, having been translated into 13 languages, including Russian, Chinese, and Spanish.

== Biography ==
Rudin was born into a Jewish family in Austria in 1921. He was enrolled for a period of time at a Swiss boarding school, the Institut auf dem Rosenberg, where he was part of a small program that prepared its students for entry to British universities. His family fled to France after the Anschluss in 1938.

When France surrendered to Germany in 1940, Rudin fled to England and served in the Royal Navy for the rest of World War II, after which he left for the United States. He obtained both his B.A. in 1947 and Ph.D. in 1949 from Duke University. After his Ph.D., he was a C. L. E. Moore instructor at MIT. He briefly taught at the University of Rochester before becoming a professor at the University of Wisconsin–Madison where he remained for 32 years. His research interests ranged from harmonic analysis to complex analysis.

In 1970 Rudin was an Invited Speaker at the International Congress of Mathematicians in Nice. He was awarded the Leroy P. Steele Prize for Mathematical Exposition in 1993 for authorship of the now classic analysis texts, Principles of Mathematical Analysis and Real and Complex Analysis. He received an honorary degree from the University of Vienna in 2006.

In 1953, he married fellow mathematician Mary Ellen Estill, known for her work in set-theoretic topology. The two resided in Madison, Wisconsin, in the eponymous Walter Rudin House, a home designed by architect Frank Lloyd Wright. They had four children.

Rudin died on May 20, 2010, after suffering from Parkinson's disease.

== Selected publications ==
Ph.D. thesis

- Rudin, Walter (1950). Uniqueness Theory for Laplace Series (Thesis). Duke University.

Selected research articles

- Rudin, Walter (1950). "Uniqueness theory for Laplace series". Trans. Amer. Math. Soc. 68 (2): 287–303. doi:10.1090/s0002-9947-1950-0033368-1. MR 0033368.
- Rudin, W. (1957). "Factorization in the group algebra of the real line". Proc Natl Acad Sci U S A. 43 (4): 339–340. Bibcode:1957PNAS...43..339R. doi:10.1073/pnas.43.4.339. PMC 528447. PMID 16578475.
- Rudin, Walter (1967). "Zero-sets in polydiscs". Bull. Amer. Math. Soc. 73 (4): 580–583. doi:10.1090/s0002-9904-1967-11758-0. MR 0210934.
- Rudin, Walter (1981). "Holomorphic maps that extend to automorphisms of a ball" (PDF). Proc. Amer. Math. Soc. 81 (3): 429–432. doi:10.1090/s0002-9939-1981-0597656-8. MR 0597656.
- "Totally real Klein bottles in ${\mathbb{C}}^2$"(PDF)". Proc. Amer. Math. Soc. 82 (4): 653–654. 1981. doi:10.1090/s0002-9939-1981-0614897-1. MR 0614897.

Books

Textbooks:

- Principles of Mathematical Analysis. (1953; 3rd ed., 1976, 342 pp.)
- Real and Complex Analysis. (1966; 3rd ed., 1987, 416 pp.)
- Rudin, Walter (1991). Functional Analysis. International Series in Pure and Applied Mathematics. Vol. 8 (Second ed.). New York, NY: McGraw-Hill Science/Engineering/Math. ISBN 978-0-07-054236-5. OCLC 21163277.
- Functional Analysis. (1973; 2nd ed., 1991, 424 pp.)

Monographs:

- Rudin, Walter; Bers, L.; Courant, R.; Stoker, J. J.; Henney, Dagmar Renate (1964). "Fourier Analysis on Groups". Physics Today. 17 (1): 82. Bibcode:1964PhT....17a..82R. doi:10.1063/1.3051392. (1962)
- Function Theory in Polydiscs. (1969)
- Function Theory in the Unit Ball of $\mathbb{C}^n$. (1980)

Autobiography:

- Rudin, Walter (1997). The Way I Remember It. Providence, RI: American Mathematical Society. ISBN 978-0-8218-0633-3.

== Major awards ==
- Steele Prize for Mathematical Exposition (1993)

== See also ==
- Helson–Kahane–Katznelson–Rudin theorem
- Rudin–Shapiro sequence
- Rudin's conjecture
