= Hart F. Smith =

American mathematician

Hart Francis Smith, III (born 11 August 1962) is an American mathematician, specializing in analysis.

== Biography ==
Hart F. Smith III received in 1984 from the University of California, Berkeley his A.B. in mathematics and in January 1989 from Princeton University his Ph.D. in mathematics under the supervision of Elias M. Stein with thesis The subelliptic oblique derivative problem. Smith was from 1988–1991 a C. L. E. Moore Instructor at MIT and in fall-winter 1991–1992 a visiting fellow at Princeton University. He was appointed at the University of Washington in 1991 an assistant professor, in 1995 an associate professor, and in 1999 a full professor, holding this professorship until the present. He has been an invited lecturer at a number of mathematical conferences in the US and abroad. He was an Invited Speaker with talk Wave Equations with Low Regularity Coefficients at the International Congress of Mathematicians in Berlin in 1998.

His father Hart Francis Smith Jr. (1930–2018) received an M.A. in economics from Yale University in 1954 and taught high school mathematics in public schools and in Catholic schools in the San Francisco Bay area.
