= Daniel Rider =

American mathematician

Daniel Gisriel Rider, Jr. (23 July 23, 1938, Boston – 11 July 2008, Madison, Wisconsin) was a mathematician, specializing in harmonic analysis and Fourier analysis.

After spending his childhood in New England, Daniel Rider moved with his family to Santa Ana, California, where he graduated from secondary school. He received his bachelor's degree from Stanford University and in 1964 his PhD under Walter Rudin from the University of Wisconsin, Madison with thesis Gap Series, and Measures of Spheres. Rider was a C.L.E. Moore instructor at the Massachusetts Institute of Technology and then an assistant professor at Yale University. At the University of Wisconsin, Madison he was an associate professor of mathematics from 1968 to 1971 and then a full professor from 1971 until his retirement as professor emeritus in 2003. He was a Sloan fellow from 1969 to 1971. In 1970 he was an invited speaker at the ICM in Nice.

== Selected publications ==
- with Alessandro Figà-Talamanca: Figà-Talamanca, Alessandro; Rider, Daniel (1966). "A theorem of Littlewood and lacunary series for compact groups". Pacific Journal of Mathematics. 16 (3): 505–514. doi:10.2140/pjm.1966.16.505.
- A relation between a theorem of Bohr and Sidon sets. Bull. Amer. Math. Soc. 72 (1966) 558–561. MR 0192282
- Central idempotents in group algebras. Bull. Amer. Math. Soc. 72 (1966) 1000–1002. MR 0200744
- Translation-invariant Dirichlet algebras on compact groups. Proc. Amer. Math. Soc. 17 (1966) 977–983. MR 0198140
- Functions which operate in the Fourier algebra of a compact group. Proc. Amer. Math. Soc. 28 (1971) 525–530. MR 0276792
- Rider, Daniel (1972). "Central lacunary sets". Monatshefte für Mathematik. 76 (4): 328–338. doi:10.1007/BF01297366. S2CID 123644292.
- Central idempotent measures on compact groups. Trans. Amer. Math. Soc. 186 (1973) 459–479. MR 0340961
- Randomly continuous functions and Sidon sets. Duke Math. J. 42, no. 4 (1975): 759–764. MR 0387965
