= Michigan Mathematical Journal =

Academic mathematics journal

- Discipline: Mathematics
- Language: English
- Edited by: Mircea Mustaţă

Publication details
- History: 1952–present

Standard abbreviations
- ISO 4: Mich. Math. J.
- MathSciNet: Michigan Math. J.

Indexing
- ISSN: 0026-2285 (print); 1945-2365 (web)

Links
- Journal homepage

The Michigan Mathematical Journal (established 1952) is published by the mathematics department at the University of Michigan. An important early editor for the Journal was George Piranian.

Historically, the Journal has been published a small number of times in a given year (currently four), in all areas of mathematics. The current Managing Editor is Mircea Mustaţă.
