= Read's conjecture =

Mathematical theorem first conjectured by Ronald Read

Read's conjecture is a conjecture, first made by Ronald Read, about the unimodality of the coefficients of chromatic polynomials in the context of graph theory. In 1974, S. G. Hoggar tightened this to the conjecture that the coefficients must be strongly log-concave. Hoggar's version of the conjecture is called the Read–Hoggar conjecture.

The Read–Hoggar conjecture had been unresolved for more than 40 years before June Huh proved it in 2009, during his PhD studies, using methods from algebraic geometry.
