= Martin Kassabov =

Bulgarian mathematician

Martin Dimitrov Kassabov (Bulgarian: Мартин Димитров Касабов, born 1977) is a Bulgarian mathematician who works as a professor of mathematics at Cornell University, specializing in combinatorial group theory.

Kassabov earned a master's degree from Sofia University in 1998. He completed his Ph.D. from Yale University in 2003 under the supervision of Efim Zelmanov. After postdoctoral research at the University of Alberta he joined Cornell as an H. C. Wang Assistant Professor in 2004.

He was the 2007–2008 winner of the AMS Centennial Fellowship. He was an invited speaker at the International Congress of Mathematicians in 2014, and in the same year won the Mathematics Prize of the Institute of Mathematics and Informatics of the Bulgarian Academy of Sciences. In 2015 he was elected as a fellow of the American Mathematical Society.
