= Helen G. Grundman =

American mathematician

Helen Grundman
- Citizenship: United States
- Education: University of California, Berkeley
- Known for: Number theory
- Scientific career
- Fields: Mathematics
- Workplaces: American Mathematical Society
- Thesis: The Arithmetic Genus of Hilbert Modular Threefolds (1977)
- Doctoral advisor: P. Emery (Paul) Thomas

Helen Giessler Grundman is an American mathematician. She is the Director of Education and Diversity at the American Mathematical Society and Research Professor Emeritus of Mathematics at Bryn Mawr College. Grundman is noted for her research in number theory and efforts to increase diversity in mathematics.

== Education ==
Helen Grundman earned her PhD in 1989 from the University of California, Berkeley, under the supervision of P. Emery Thomas.

== Employment ==
After receiving her PhD, Grundman spent two years as a C. L. E. Moore instructor at the Massachusetts Institute of Technology. She became a professor at Bryn Mawr College in 1991. In 2016, Grundman was named as the inaugural Director of Education and Diversity for the American Mathematical Society.

== Research ==
In 1994, Grundman proved that sequences of more than 2n consecutive Harshad numbers in base n do not exist.^{[G94]}

== Honors ==
In 2017, Grundman was selected as a fellow of the Association for Women in Mathematics in the inaugural class. That same year, she also received the M. Gwyneth Humphries Award from the Association for Women in Mathematics for outstanding mentorship.

== Selected publications ==
G94.	Grundman, H. G. (1994). "Sequences of consecutive n-Niven numbers" (PDF). Fibonacci Quarterly. 32 (2): 174–175. doi:10.1080/00150517.1994.12429245. ISSN 0015-0517. Zbl 0796.11002.
