= Lake at Falls =

- Location within Montana Location within the United States
- Location: Carbon County, Montana
- Coordinates: 45°07′24″N 109°42′32″W
- Type: lake
- Basin countries: United States
- Surface elevation: 8,133 ft (2,479 m)

Lake at Falls is a lake in Carbon County, Montana, in the United States.

Lake at Falls was named from the two waterfalls which flow into it.

== See also ==
- List of lakes in Montana
