= William Lawrence Kocay =

Canadian academic

W. L. Kocay
- Education: University of Waterloo
- Scientific career
- Fields: Graph theory Computer science
- Workplaces: University of Manitoba
- Doctoral advisor: Ronald C. Read

William Lawrence Kocay is a Canadian professor at the department of computer science at St. Paul's College of the University of Manitoba and a graph theorist. He is known for his work in graph algorithms and the reconstruction conjecture and is affectionately referred to as "Wild Bill" by his students. Bill Kocay is a former managing editor (from Jan 1988 to May 1997) of Ars Combinatoria, a Canadian journal of combinatorial mathematics, is a founding fellow of the Institute of Combinatorics and its Applications.

His research interests include algorithms for graphs, the development of mathematical software, the graph reconstruction problem, the graph isomorphism problem, projective geometry, Hamiltonian cycles, planarity, graph embedding algorithms, graphs on surfaces, and combinatorial designs.

== Publications ==
- Some new methods in reconstruction theory, W. L. Kocay – Combinatorial mathematics, IX (Brisbane, 1981), LNM
- Some NP-complete problems for hypergraph degree sequences, CJ Colbourn, WL Kocay, DR Stinson – Discrete Applied Mathematics, 1986 – portal.acm.org

== Books and software package ==
- Graphs, algorithms, and optimization By William Kocay, Donald L. Kreher, Published 2004, CRC Press, 483 pages
- Groups and graphs – A mainly Mac OS X software package for graphs, digraphs, combinatorial designs, projective configurations, polyhedra, graph embeddings in the torus and projective plane, and automorphism groups. It also constructs fractals.

== See also ==
- List of University of Waterloo people
