= Maria E. Schonbek =

Argentine-American mathematician

Maria Elena Schonbek is an Argentine-American mathematician at the University of California, Santa Cruz. Her research concerns fluid dynamics and associated partial differential equations such as the Navier–Stokes equations.

== Education and career ==
Schonbek received a bachelor's degree from the University of Buenos Aires. She completed her Ph.D. at the University of Michigan in 1976. Her dissertation, Boundary Value Problems for the Fitzhugh–Nagumo Equations, was supervised by Jeffrey Rauch.

Schonbek joined the University of California, Santa Cruz faculty in 1986. Formerly a professor of mathematics there, she has retired to become a professor emeritus. At Santa Cruz, Schonbek advocated replacing the campus's system of narrative evaluations of student performance in each course with the more standard system of letter grades used at most other US universities.

== Recognition ==
In 2012, Schonbek became a member of the inaugural class of fellows of the American Mathematical Society.
