= Arch Lake =

Arch Lake (Montana)
- Location within Montana Location within the United States
- Location: 12 miles (19 km) northeast of US 212
- Coordinates: 45°09′33″N 109°44′18″W
- Lake type: natural freshwater lake
- Basin countries: United States
- Max. length: 2,590 ft (790 m)
- Max. width: 930 ft (280 m)
- Surface area: 50.24 acres (20 ha)
- Average depth: 39 ft (12 m)
- Max. depth: 112 ft (34 m)
- Surface elevation: 9,997 ft (3,047 m)
- Islands: multiple islets

Arch Lake is a lake in Carbon County, Montana, in the United States.

Arch Lake took its name from the granite arch that sits on the south ridge. It is remote from all roads, but can be reached on foot. Much of the route to it is rugged and part of the way has no trail.

== See also ==
- List of lakes in Montana
