= Statue of Benjamin Franklin (Boston) =

Statue in Boston, Massachusetts, U.S.

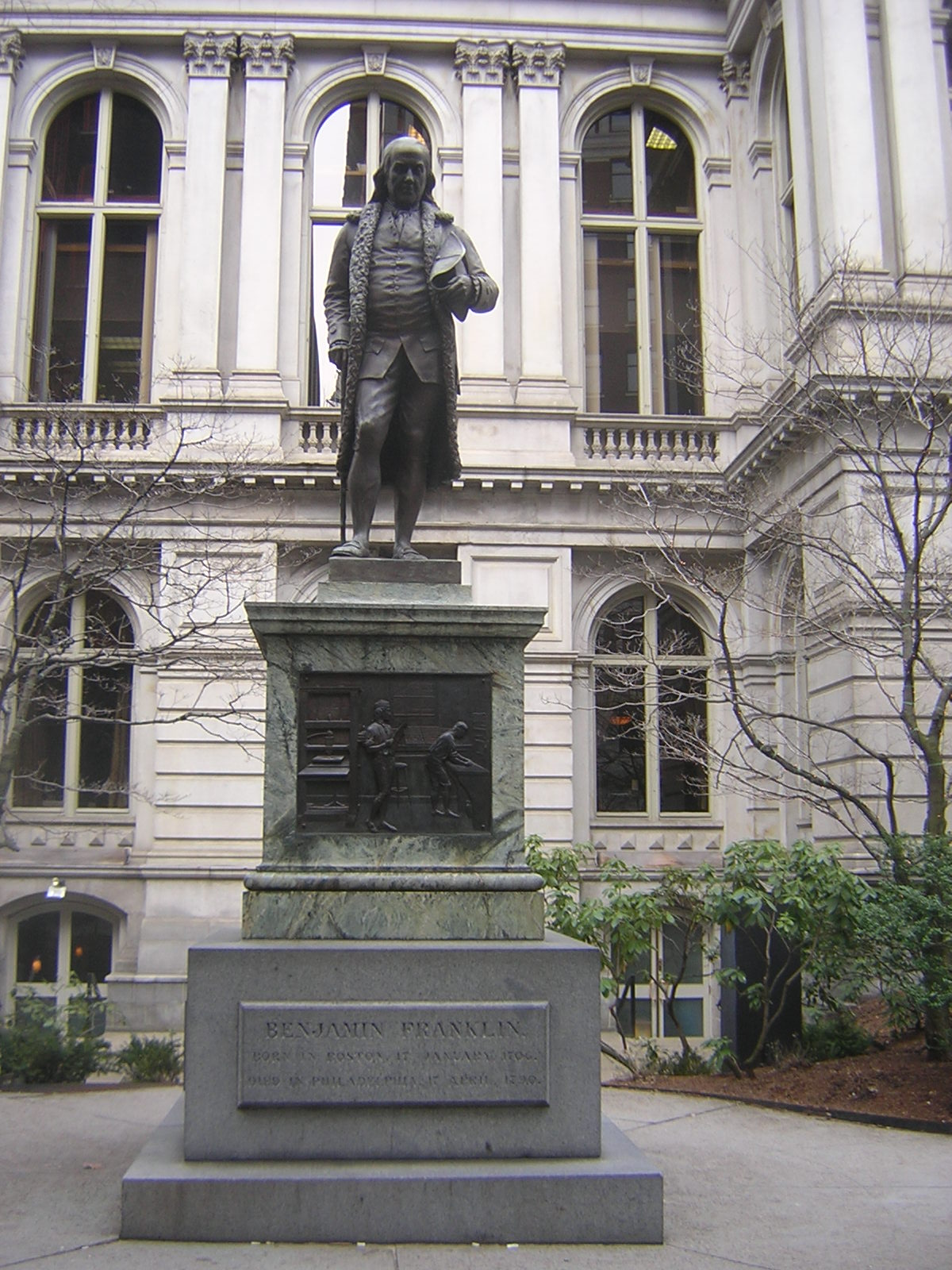
- The statue in 2008
- Year: 1856
- Subject: Benjamin Franklin
- Location: Boston, Massachusetts, U.S.; 42°21′28.7″N 71°3′34.7″W

A statue of Benjamin Franklin by Richard Saltonstall Greenough is installed outside Old City Hall in Boston, Massachusetts, United States. It rests on a base with plaques designed by Greenough and Thomas Ball.

== Description ==
The statue of Franklin measures approximately 8 ft., 4 in. x 2 ft., 2 in. x 2 ft., 2 in., and rests on a marble and granite base that measures approximately 9 ft., 3 in. x 7 ft., 6 in. x 7 ft., 6 in. The base features four plaques: the front and back plaques (Franklin Experimenting with Electricity and Franklin in His Printing Shop) were designed by Greenough, and the other two (Franklin at Paris Peace Treaty and Franklin at the Declaration of Independence) were designed by Thomas Ball.

== History ==
The bronze sculpture was modeled in 1855, and dedicated on September 17, 1856. It cost $20,000 and was erected as Boston's first portrait statue to commemorate the sesquicentennial of Franklin's birth. The statue was originally installed in front of Bullfinch's Court House, before being relocated to City Hall.

The work was surveyed as part of the Smithsonian Institution's "Save Outdoor Sculpture!" program in 1993.

== See also ==
- 1856 in art
