= Glennie's identity =

Identity valid in special Jordan algebras but not in all Jordan algebras

In mathematics, Glennie's identity is an identity used by Charles M. Glennie to establish some s-identities that are valid in special Jordan algebras but not in all Jordan algebras. A Jordan s-identity ("s" for special) is a Jordan polynomial which vanishes in all special Jordan algebras but not in all Jordan algebras. What is now known as Glennie's identity first appeared in his 1963 Yale PhD thesis with Nathan Jacobson as thesis advisor.

== Formal definition ==
Let • denote the product in a special Jordan algebra $A$. For all X, Y, Z in A, define the Jordan triple product

1. {X,Y,Z} = X•(Y•Z) − Y•(Z•X) + Z•(X•Y) then Glennie's identity G_{8} holds in the form:
2. 2{ {Z,{X,Y,X},Z}, Y, Z•X} − {Z, {X, {Y, X•Z, Y}, X}, Z} = 2{ X•Z, Y, {X, {Z,Y,Z}, X} } − {X, {Z, {Y,X•Z,Y}, Z}, X}.
