= Sarah Dana Greenough =

American poet and novelist

- Born: February 19, 1827; Boston
- Died: August 9, 1885; Františkovy Lázně
- Resting place: Protestant Cemetery, Rome
- Occupation: Writer
- Spouse: Richard Saltonstall Greenough
- Children: Nina Greenough, Gordon Greenough
- Father: William Joseph Loring

Sarah Dana Loring Greenough (February 19, 1827 – August 9, 1885) was an American novelist.

Sarah Dana Loring was born on February 19, 1827 in Boston. She was the daughter of William Joseph Loring (1795–1841) and Anna Thorndike Loring (1804–1872). In 1846, she married sculptor Richard Saltonstall Greenough. They had two children, Anna Loring "Nina" Greenough (1847–1897), and artist Richard Gordon Greenough (1851–1885). They lived in both American and Europe, particularly Rome.

Her novel Lilian (1863) is about an American couple in Rome, inspired by her own experience and by Nathaniel Hawthorne's The Marble Faun. Her collection Arabesques: Monarè, Apollyona, Domitia, Ornbra (1871), illustrated by her son, consists of four fantasy stories involving knights, witches, a werewolf, and Roman gods.

Sarah Dana Greenough died on August 9, 1885 in Františkovy Lázně. Her husband sculpted a monument to her, Psyche Divesting Herself of Mortality, which is in the Protestant Cemetery in Rome.

== Bibliography ==
- Lilian. London, 1863.
- Treason at Home: A Novel. 3 vol. London: T. C. Newby, 1865.
- Arabesques : Monarè, Apollyona, Domitia, Ombra: Four Stories of the Supernatural, Boston, 1872, sq. 16mo.
- In Extremis: the Story of a Broken Law, Boston, 1872, sq. 16mo.
- Mary Magdalene: a Poem, Boston,, 1880, 12ino.
- Mary Magdalene, and other Poems, Boston, 1886, 16mo.
