= C. L. E. Moore instructor =

Job title at MIT

The job title of C. L. E. Moore instructor is given by the Mathematics Department at Massachusetts Institute of Technology to recent math PhDs hired for their promise in pure mathematics research. The instructors are expected to do both teaching and research. Past C. L. E. Moore instructors include John Nash, Walter Rudin, Elias Stein, as well as four Fields Medal winners: Paul Cohen, Daniel Quillen, Curtis T. McMullen and Akshay Venkatesh.

The instructorships are named after Clarence Lemuel Elisha Moore (1876–1931), who was a mathematics professor, specializing in geometry, at MIT from 1904 until his death.

Past holders of the position include Dan Abramovich, Tom Apostol, Denis Auroux, Sheldon Axler, Patricia E. Bauman, Alexander Braverman, Egbert Brieskorn, Felix Browder, Paul Cohen, Charles C. Conley, Caterina Consani, Michael W. Davis, Nils Dencker, George Duff, Lawrence Ein, Daniel S. Freed, Harry Furstenberg, John Garnett, Mark Goresky, Helen G. Grundman, Joe Harris, Sigurður Helgason, Lars Hesselholt, Eleny Ionel, Vadim Kaloshin, Yael Karshon, Alexander Kechris, Anthony Knapp, Nancy Kopell, Irwin Kra, Kefeng Liu, Matilde Marcolli, Kevin McCrimmon, Curtis McMullen, William Messing, Emmy Murphy, John Forbes Nash Jr., Irena Peeva, Daniel Quillen, Douglas Ravenel, Daniel G. Rider, Walter Rudin, Robert Rumely, James Serrin, William Shaw, Joseph H. Silverman, James Simons, Isadore M. Singer, Hart F. Smith, Karen E. Smith, George Springer, Richard P. Stanley, James D. Stasheff, Elias Stein, Gilbert Strang, Robert Strichartz, Alessandro Figà Talamanca, Shang-Hua Teng, Robert Thomason, Edward Thorp, Douglas Ulmer, Akshay Venkatesh, Chelsea Walton, Gerard Washnitzer, Alan Weinstein, and Zhiwei Yun.

== See also ==
- Mathematics education in the United States
