= Mark de Cataldo =

Italian mathematician

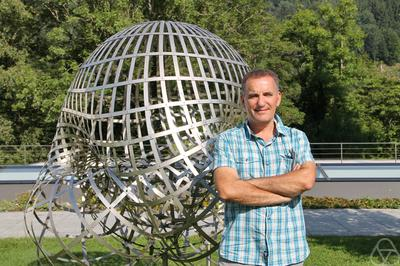
De Cataldo at Oberwolfach in 2017

Mark Andrea de Cataldo is an Italian mathematician.

De Cataldo earned a doctorate from the University of Notre Dame in 1995, and began teaching at Stony Brook University in 1998–1999, after completing postdoctoral research at the Washington University in St. Louis, the Max Planck Institute for Mathematics, and Harvard University. He is a member of the Institute for Advanced Study and has been awarded the Simons Foundation fellowship. In 2019, de Cataldo was elected a fellow of the American Mathematical Society.
