= Robert Lazarsfeld =

American mathematician

- Born: April 15, 1953 (age 73); New York City
- Education: Brown University; Harvard University
- Scientific career
- Fields: Mathematics
- Workplaces: Stony Brook University; University of Michigan; University of California, Los Angeles
- Thesis: Branched Coverings of Projective Space (1980)
- Doctoral advisor: William Fulton
- Doctoral students: Christopher Hacon; Mihnea Popa

Robert Kendall Lazarsfeld (born April 15, 1953) is an American mathematician who specializes in algebraic geometry. He is currently a distinguished professor of mathematics at Stony Brook University. He was previously the Raymond L. Wilder Collegiate Professor of Mathematics at the University of Michigan. He is the son of two sociologists, Paul Lazarsfeld and Patricia Kendall.

== Career ==
Lazarsfeld received his B.A. from Harvard College in 1975 and earned his Ph.D. from Brown University in 1980 under supervision of William Fulton.

From 1983 to 1998, Lazarsfeld was an assistant professor, associate professor, and professor of mathematics at UCLA. He joined the faculty of the University of Michigan in 1997 and served as the Raymond L. Wilder Collegiate Professor there from 2007 to 2013. In 2013 he joined the faculty of Stony Brook University, where he was the chair of the Mathematics Department from 2016-2019. Since 2015, he is a distinguished professor at Stony Brook.

From 2002–2009, Lazarsfeld was an editor at the Journal of the American Mathematical Society (Managing Editor, 2007–2009). In 2012–2013, he served as the Managing Editor of the Michigan Mathematical Journal.

== Awards and honors ==
In 2006, Lazarsfeld was elected as a Fellow of the American Academy of Arts and Sciences.

In 2012 he became a fellow of the American Mathematical Society.

In 2015 he was awarded the AMS Leroy P. Steele Prize for Mathematical Exposition.

== Selected works ==
- Lazarsfeld, Robert (2004). Positivity in algebraic geometry, Vol. I. Berlin: Springer. ISBN 3-540-22533-1.; Lazarsfeld, R. K. (2004). Positivity in algebraic geometry, Vol. II. ISBN 3-540-22534-X.
- Lazarsfeld, Robert; Van de Ven, Antonius (2012) [1984]. Topics in the geometry of projective space: Recent work of FL Zak (with an addendum by Fyodor Zak). DMV Seminar Vol. 4. Birkhäuser. ISBN 9783034893480.
