= Richard Saltonstall Greenough =

American sculptor (1819–1904)

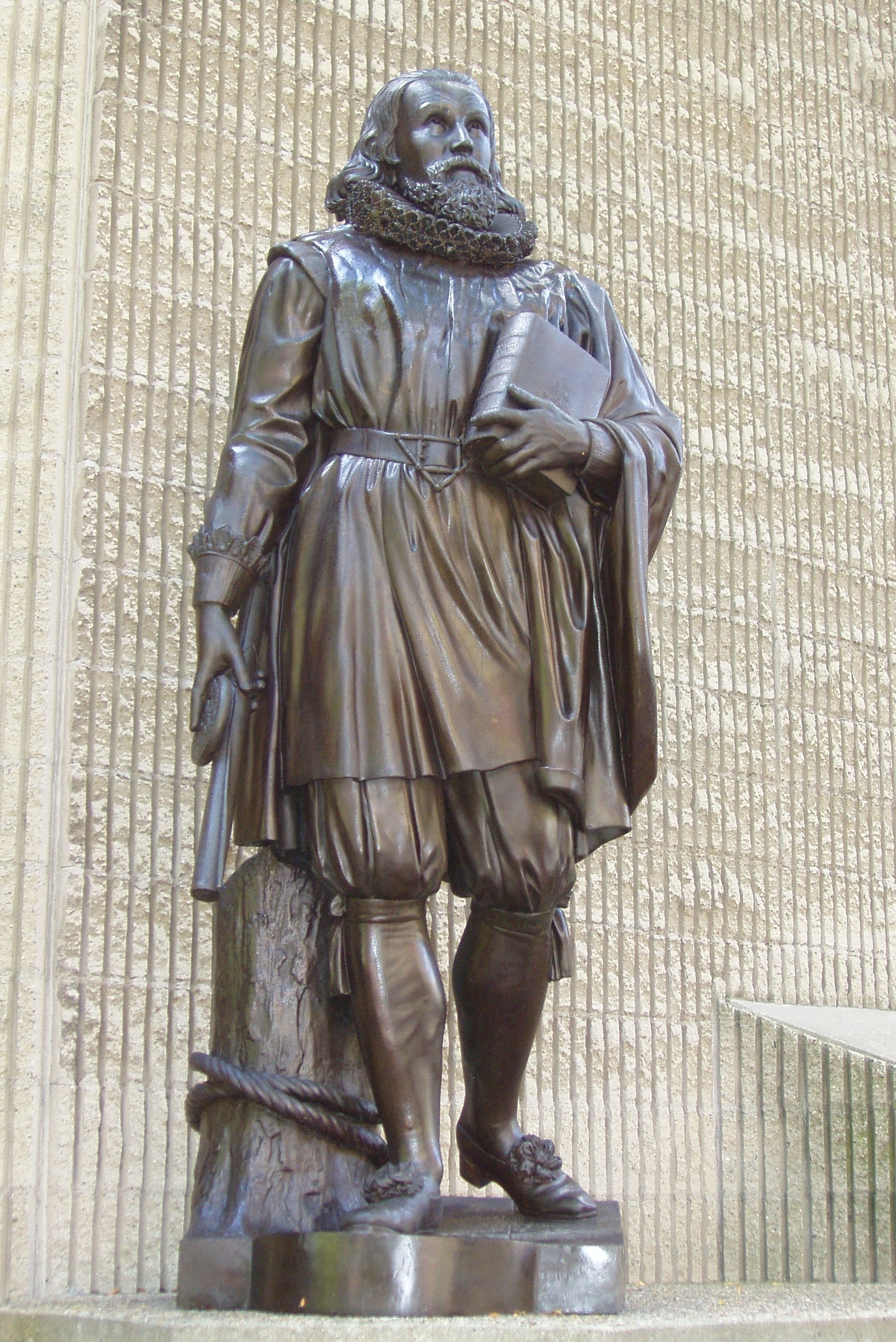
- Bronze statue of John Winthrop by Greenough (1873). Marlborough Street, Back Bay, Boston
- Born: 1819; Boston, Massachusetts, US
- Died: 1904
- Known for: Sculpture

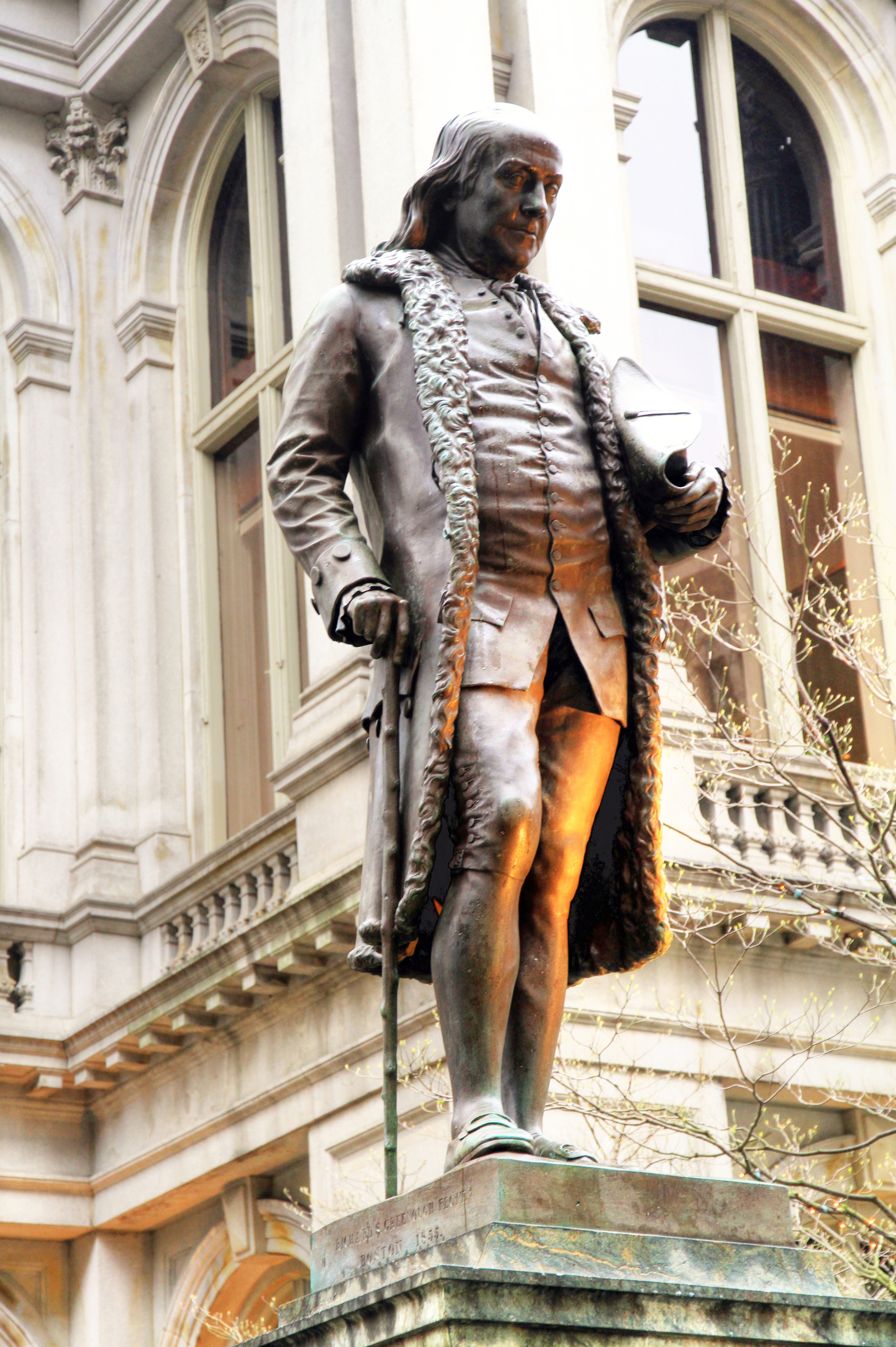
Statue of Benjamin Franklin outside Boston's Old City Hall

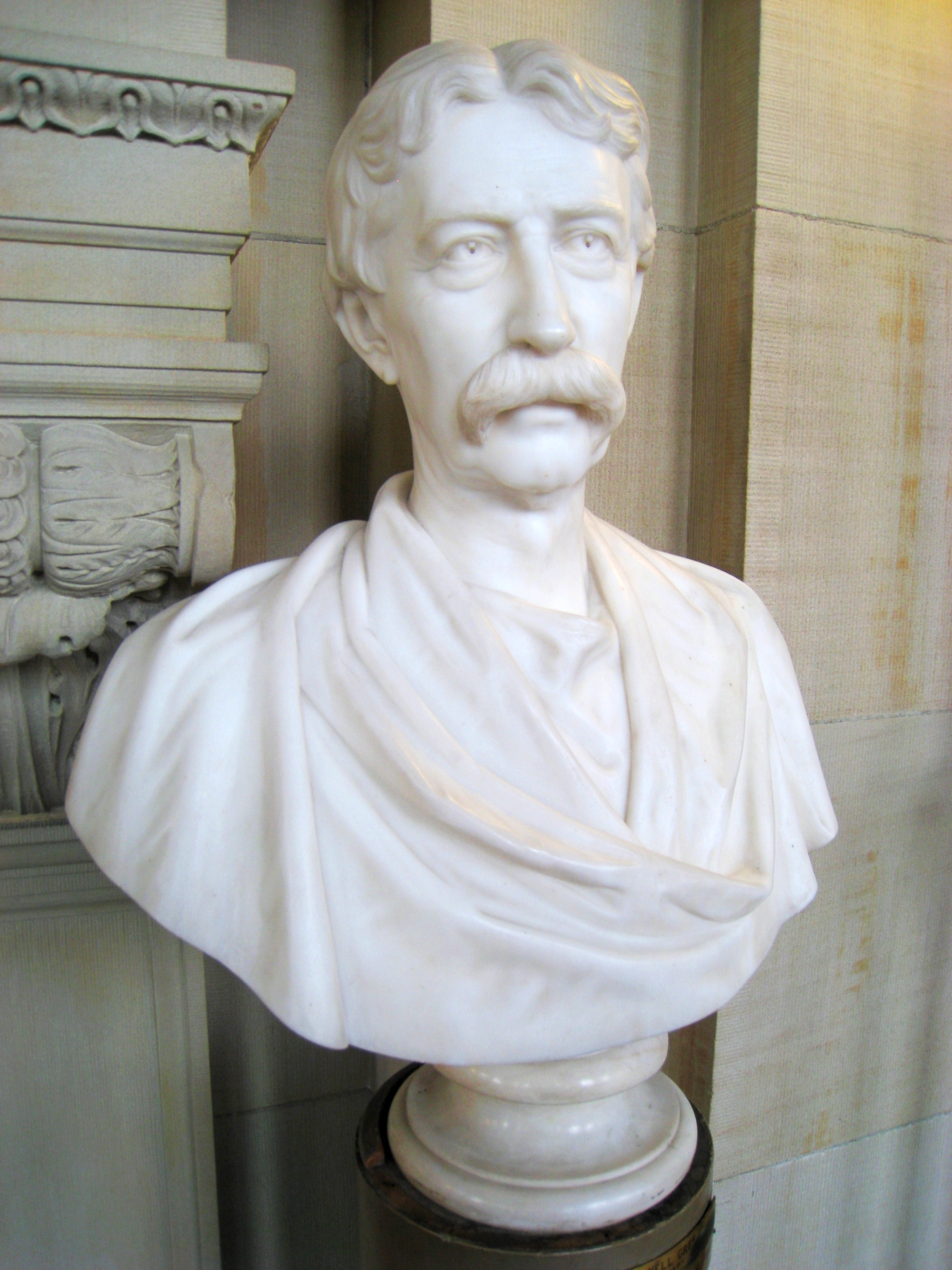
Bust of William Whitwell Greenough

Richard Saltonstall Greenough (April 19, 1819 – 1904) was an American sculptor and younger brother to Neoclassical sculptor Horatio Greenough.

Greenough was born in Boston, Massachusetts, the youngest child of Elizabeth (Bender) and David Greenough (1774–1836). He was educated at the Boston Latin School, entering in 1829. At age 17, he followed his brother in a career in sculpture, and in 1837 left for Italy where he belonged to the second generation of American expatriate artists. Thereafter he divided his time between Europe and America, but spent most of his studio life in Rome. Greenough married Sarah Dana Loring of Boston on September 26, 1846, and had two children at Boston in 1848 and 1851. He was elected a Fellow of the American Academy of Arts and Sciences in 1855. Greenough died in Rome in 1904. He is buried in the Protestant Cemetery, Rome.

Greenough's best-known work is probably a statue of Benjamin Franklin which stood in front of the Old City Hall (Boston). The statue on Boston's Freedom Trail, fell from its ten-foot pedestal in the early summer of 2016, but sustained almost no damage and is currently being repaired.

== Selected works ==
- 1853 Shepard Boy and Eagle, bronze, Boston Athenaeum
- 1856 Statue of Benjamin Franklin, bronze, Old City Hall (Boston)
- 1856 John Winthrop (1588–1649), marble, Memorial Hall, Harvard University
- 1860 Bust of George Hayward (1791–1863), marble, Memorial Hall, Harvard University
- 1863 Carthaginian Girl, marble, Boston Athenaeum
- 1860-1880 Mary Magdalene, Brooklyn Museum, Brooklyn, New York
- 1873 John Winthrop, bronze, Boston, Massachusetts
- 1876 John Winthrop, marble, United States Capitol
- TBD Alma Mater commemorating Civil War dead, Boston Latin School
