= Wild Bill Lake =

Lake in the American state of Montana

- Location within Montana
- Location: Carbon County, Montana
- Coordinates: 45°09′24″N 109°22′09″W
- Type: Lake
- Max. length: 750 feet (230 m)
- Max. width: 163 feet (50 m)
- Surface area: 3.2 acres (1.3 ha)
- Max. depth: 8 feet (2.4 m)
- Surface elevation: 6,719 feet (2,048 m)

Wild Bill Lake is a 3-acre (1.2 ha), barrier-free fishing lake located six miles (9.7 km) southwest of Red Lodge in Carbon County, Montana, in the United States. It is part of the Custer Gallatin National Forest and is surrounded by the 0.4-mile (0.64 km) Wild Bill National Recreation Trail. The lake is regularly stocked with rainbow trout. Wild Bill Lake was named in honor of Wild Bill Kurtzer, who frequently fished there.

== See also ==
- List of lakes in Montana
