= Lawrence Ein =

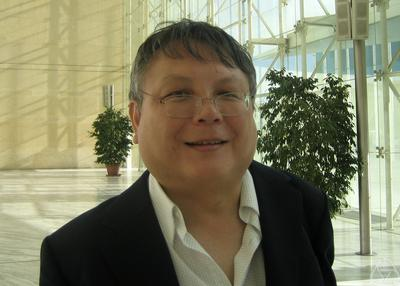
Lawrence Ein

Lawrence Man Hou Ein (born 18 November 1955) is a mathematician who works in algebraic geometry.

== Education and career ==
Lawrence Ein received in 1976 his bachelor's degree from UCLA and in 1981 his Ph.D. from the University of California, Berkeley under the direction of Robin Hartshorne with thesis Stable vector bundles on projective spaces in char p > 0 (which was published in Mathematische Annalen).

For the academic year 1981–1982 he was an American Mathematical Society Postdoctoral Research Fellow at the Institute for Advanced Study. From 1982 to 1984 he was a C.L.E. Moore Instructor at MIT. He became from 1984 to 1987 an assistant professor, from 1987 to 1989 an associate professor, and from 1989 to the present a full professor at the University of Illinois at Chicago. He has been a visiting professor at the University of Hong Kong, UCLA, the University of Michigan, Harvard University, the University of Nancy, and the MSRI in Berkeley.

Ein has served on the editorial boards of the Transactions and Memoirs of the American Mathematical Society from 1995 to 2003, Communications in Algebra from 1995 to the present, Geometriae Dedicata from 2004 to 2013, and Serdica Mathematical Journal from 2004 to the present.

Ein was a Sloan Fellow from 1986 to 1989. He was an Invited Speaker of the ICM in 2006 in Madrid. He was elected a Fellow of the American Mathematical Society in 2012.

== Selected publications ==
- Ein, Lawrence (1986). "Hilbert schemes of smooth space curves". Annales Scientifiques de l'École Normale Supérieure. 19 (4): 469–478. doi:10.24033/asens.1513.
- with Aaron Bertram and Robert Lazarsfeld: Bertram, A.; Ein, Lawrence; Lazarsfeld, Robert (1991). "Surjectivity of Gaussian maps for line bundles of large degree on curves". Algebraic geometry. Lecture Notes in Mathematics book series (LNM, volume 1479). Vol. 1479. Berlin; Heidelberg: Springer. pp. 15–25. doi:10.1007/BFb0086260. ISBN 978-3-540-54456-2.
- with Aaron Bertram and R. Lazarsfeld: Bertram, Aaron; Ein, Lawrence; Lazarsfeld, Robert (1991). "Vanishing theorems, a theorem of Severi, and the equations defining projective varieties". J. Amer. Math. Soc. 4 (3): 587–602. doi:10.1090/S0894-0347-1991-1092845-5.
- with R. Lazarsfeld: Ein, Lawrence; Lazarsfeld, Robert (1993). "Global generation of pluricanonical and adjoint linear series on smooth projective threefolds". J. Amer. Math. Soc. 6 (4): 875–903. doi:10.1090/S0894-0347-1993-1207013-5.
- with R. Lazarsfeld: Ein, Lawrence; Lazarsfeld, Robert (1997). "Singularities of theta divisors and the birational geometry of irregular varieties". J. Amer. Math. Soc. 10: 243–258. arXiv:alg-geom/9603017. doi:10.1090/S0894-0347-97-00223-3.
- with Jean-Pierre Demailly and R. Lazarsfeld: Demailly, Jean-Pierre; Ein, Lawrence; Lazarsfeld, Robert (2000). "A subadditivity property of multiplier ideals". arXiv:math/0002035.
- with R. Lazarsfeld and Karen E. Smith: Ein, Lawrence; Lazarsfeld, Robert; Smith, Karen E (2001). "Uniform bounds and symbolic powers on smooth varieties". Inventiones Mathematicae. 144 (2): 241–262. arXiv:math/0005098. Bibcode:2001InMat.144..241E. doi:10.1007/s002220100121. S2CID 14857907.
- with Tommaso de Fernex: Beltrametti, Mauro C.; Catanese, Fabrizio; Ciliberto, Ciro; Lanteri, Antonio; Pedrini, Claudio (2002). "Resolution of indeterminacy of pairs". Algebraic geometry. Walter de Gruyter. pp. 165–177. ISBN 9783110198072.
- with R. Lazarsfeld: Ein, Lawrence; Lazarsfeld, Robert (2012). "Asymptotic syzygies of algebraic varieties". Inventiones Mathematicae. 190 (3): 603–646. arXiv:1103.0483. Bibcode:2012InMat.190..603E. doi:10.1007/s00222-012-0384-5. S2CID 119329785.
- with R. Lazarsfeld: Ein, Lawrence; Lazarsfeld, Robert (2015). "The gonality conjecture on syzygies of algebraic curves of large degree". Publications Mathématiques de l'IHÉS. 122 (1): 301–313. arXiv:1407.4445. doi:10.1007/s10240-015-0072-2. S2CID 119324291.
