= Greenough Lake =

- Location within Montana
- Location: Carbon County, Montana
- Coordinates: 45°03′06″N 109°25′03″W
- Type: lake
- Surface elevation: 7,270 ft (2,216 m)

Greenough Lake is a lake in Carbon County, Montana, in the United States.

Greenough Lake was named for a family of rodeo performers.

== See also ==
- List of lakes in Montana

== See also ==
- Alice Greenough Orr
