= Adana Gundogdu Schools =

Private school in Adana, Turkey

Coordinates: 37.0488°N 35.27155°E

Adana Gundogdu Schools is a large private educational establishment situated in Adana, Turkey. It educates nearly 3,000 students between the ages of 3 and 18. It was founded in 1988 by Yunus Gundogdu, a local businessman who wanted to create a school for his three children.

It is a privately owned establishment which has been approved and is subject to MEB regulations. Gundogdu is a day school and attracts students from all local areas including Seyhan, Cukurova and Ceyhan.

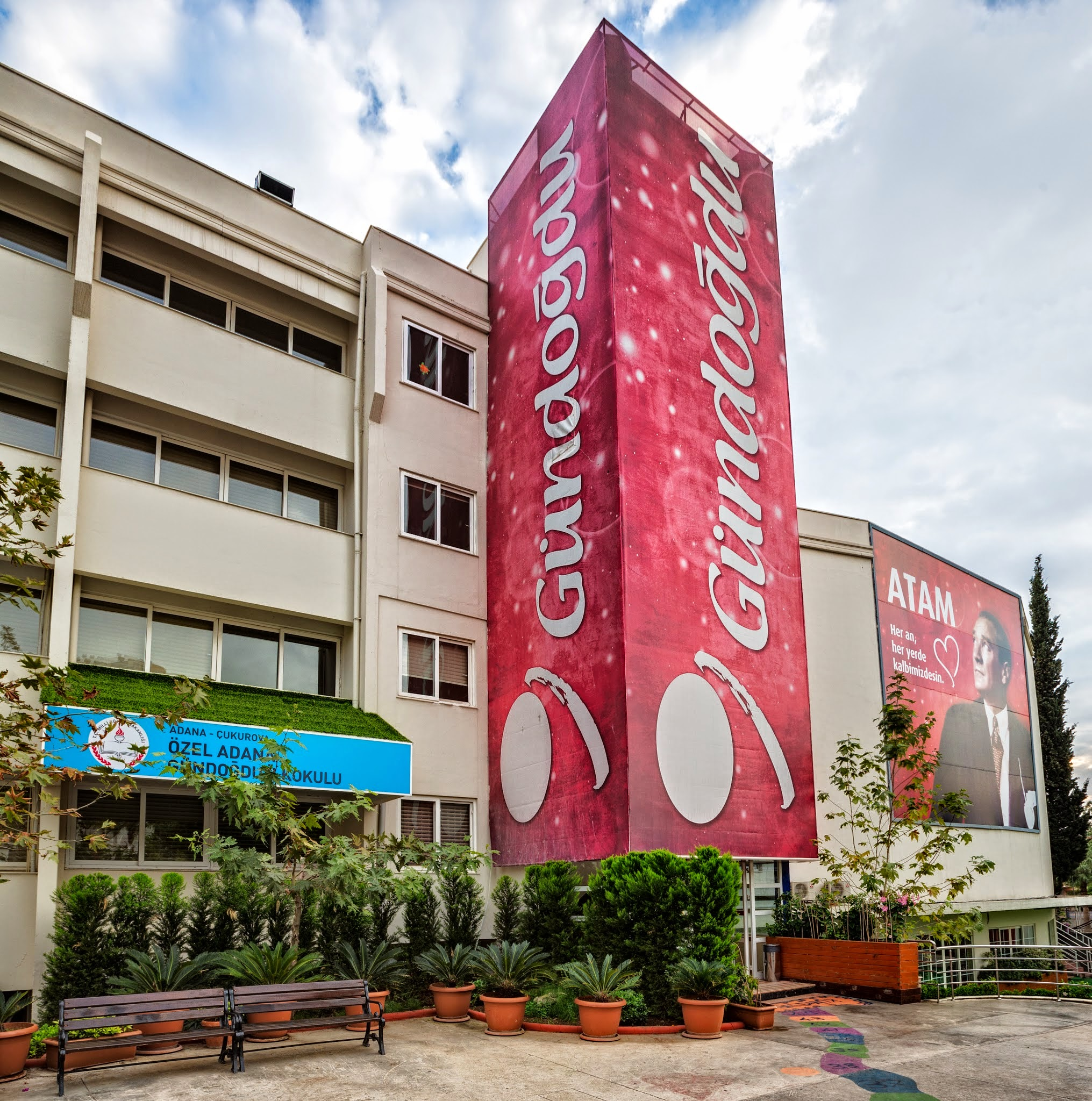
Adana Gundogdu Schools

== History ==
When Gundogdu first opened its doors to 86 students in 1988, its original campus was situated next to Seyhan Lake; it moved to its current campus in 1993. The current campus is 12,000 square meters and houses all schools. This includes the International Children's University, Primary School, Middle School, Science High School and Anatolian High School. The International Children's University was added in 2012. Ibrahim Kutluay Basketball School, Gymboree, and British Swim School were added to the campus in 2013.

== Education ==
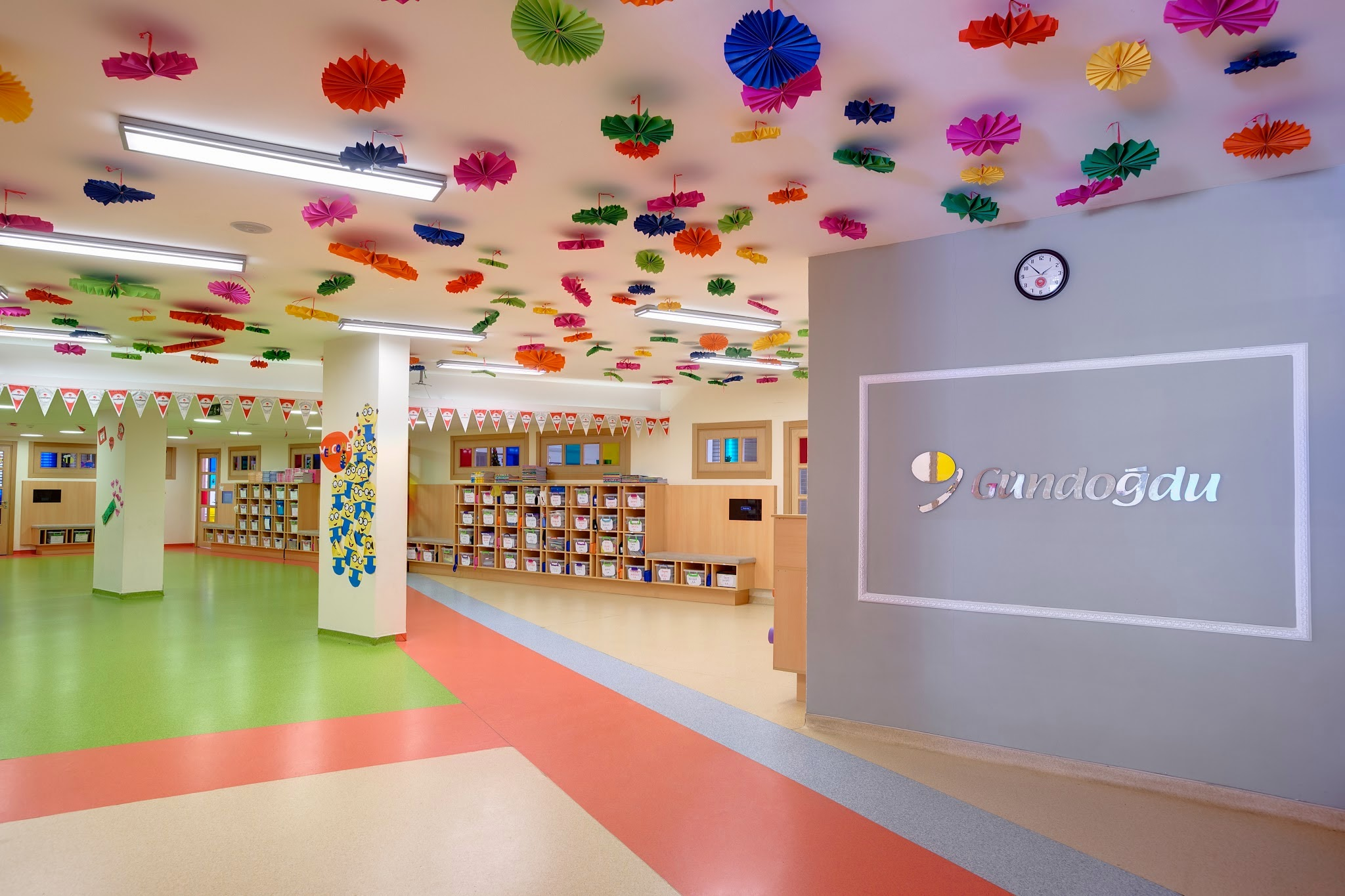
Gundogdu Primary School

Gundogdu has five different schools, all based on the same campus. The first school is the International Children's University, which houses students from the ages of 3 to 6 years old. This school has its own separate building and is unique in that it has no stairs. The classes have 24 students and they follow the HighScope teaching method. Teaching standards are assessed by Early Years Ireland. Currently, there are three Nino classes (3-4-year-olds), four Pre-kinder classes (4–5-years-old), and six Kinder classes (5–6-years-old).

The Primary School is for students from years 1 to 4 and follows the Turkish National Curriculum prepared by MEB. The students are taught from 8:30 until 16:30 Monday to Friday, and the school follows all national holidays. Currently, there are 6 classes in each year group, and each class has 24 students. The main subjects are taught by class teachers, arts, sports, foreign languages, music and robotics lessons are taught by specialist teachers.

Middle School is the largest building with over 1,500 students. There are four years of Middle School, resulting in the students taking the national TEOG Exam in November and April of their final year. The school again follows the National Curriculum but all subjects are taught by specialist teachers. Each class has a maximum size of 24. In the 5th grade, the students follow an intensive English program that includes lessons in science and mathematics in English using the Cambridge International Exam system.

High School is split into two different schools: depending on the students' TEOG results they can attend Science High School or Anatolian High School. Each school is based in the same building and follows the Turkish National Curriculum. Science High School is usually attended by students who wish to go into the medical profession, engineering or any careers that require a higher level of knowledge in mathematics and science. Anatolian School concentrates more on language study and social sciences. There are currently 10 Science High School classes and 23 Anatolian classes. Each school has 4 years of study, and in the final year, all students take the LYS Exam that determines which university and what course they will study.

== Accreditation ==
Eaquals association accredited the foreign languages department of the school in March 2015. In November 2016, the Council of International Schools (CIS) accepted Adana Gundogdu Schools as a member and currently working towards accreditation. The schools have recently also applied to participate in the Turkish Perfection Awards which assess the company using the EFQM model.

== Student council and alumni ==
Gundogdu has a large student council that is voted on every year. The student council consists of a president and over 400 council members, these members have responsibility for many social projects this has including, concerts to help Children with leukaemia, supply school furniture to state schools who need it and raising money for local charities.

Alumni includes Gozde Durmuş and Canan Dağdeviren who were recently identified by MIT Technology Review as being people to watch under the age of 35. Two students have gone on to represent Turkey in the London Olympics in basketball and volleyball. Gundogdu has educated many local businessmen including the current president, Gokhan Gundogdu, Polen Uslu-Pehlivan, who is a player in the Turkish National Volleyball Team, Şaziye İvegen and Naile İvegen, who have played on Turkish National Basketball Team, and Direnç Bada who became the first Turkish tennis player to go to the Australian Open.

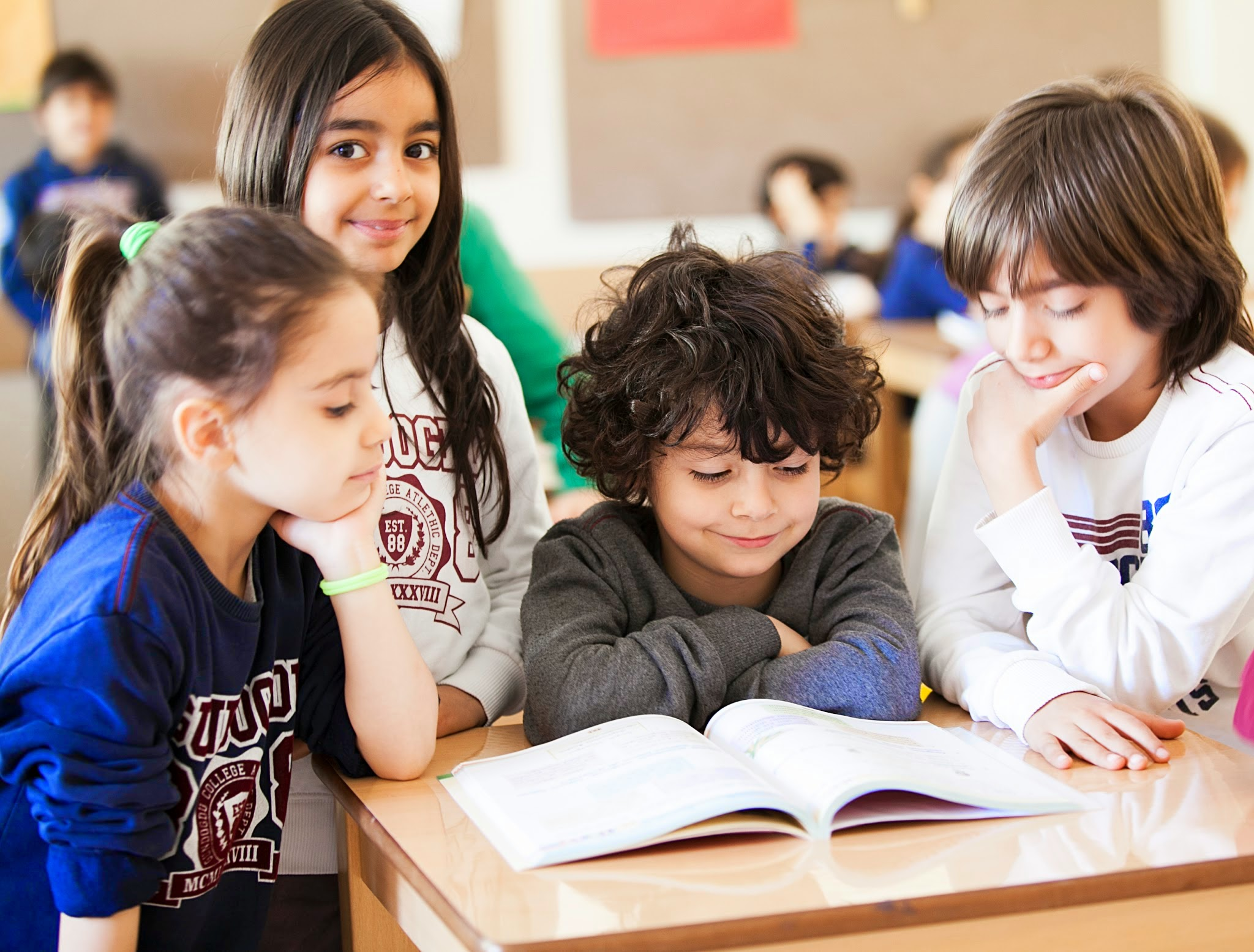
Intellectual citizen Program

== Intellectual Citizen Program ==
This program was developed to encourage students to read, this program was developed in-house and has three steps. First the students read the set book, then they write a report on the book at the same time a group students prepare a for and against debate, the program is used across all schools from Primary First grade until 11th grade in High School and also across all languages taught.

== Academic success ==
Gundogdu has had a successful record in the national TEOG exams.
