= Rory A. Cooper =

American bioengineer

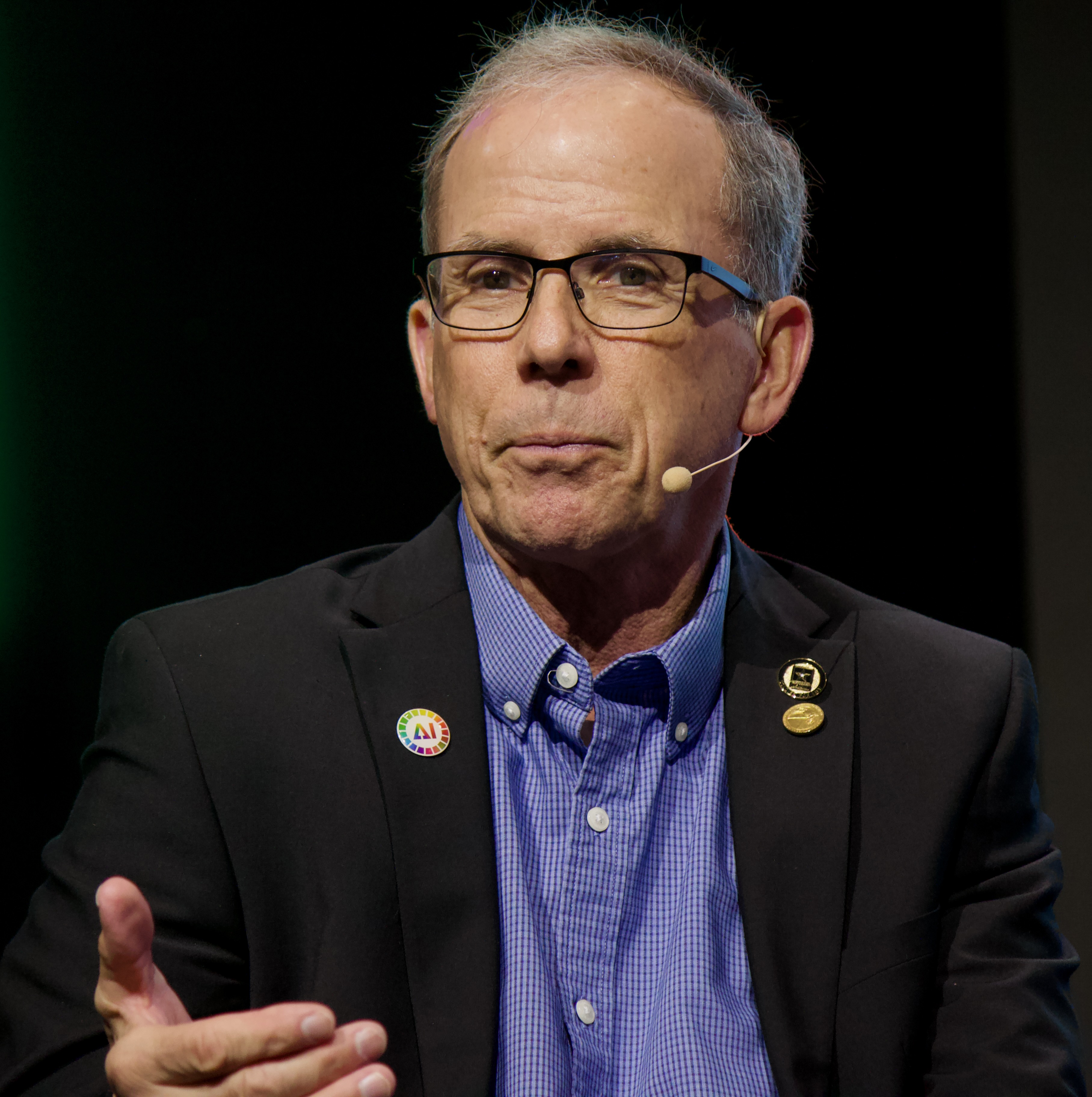
- Rory A. Cooper in 2025
- Born: November 9, 1959 (age 66); Los Angeles, California
- Education: California Polytechnic State University (BS, MEng); University of California, Santa Barbara (PhD)
- Occupations: Professor, Inventor
- Years active: 1989–present
- Employer(s): University of Pittsburgh; United States Department of Veterans Affairs
- Title: ∙ FISA/PVA Distinguished Professor in the Department of Rehabilitation Science and Technology, University of Pittsburgh ∙ Assistant Vice Chancellor for Research for STEM and Health Sciences Collaboration, University of Pittsburgh ∙ Founder and Director, Human Engineering Research Laboratories

Rory A. Cooper is an American bioengineer who currently serves as FISA/PVA Distinguished Professor, Past Chair, in the Department of Rehabilitation Science and Technology and professor of bioengineering, physical medicine and rehabilitation, and orthopedic surgery at the University of Pittsburgh. He is also assistant vice chancellor for research for STEM and Health Sciences Collaboration, and a National Medal of Technology and Innovation Laureate. He holds an adjunct faculty position at the Robotics Institute of Carnegie Mellon University, and is an invited professor at Xi'an Jiaotong University in Xi'an, China.

He is the founder and director of the Human Engineering Research Laboratories.

== Early life ==
In December 1972, Cooper became an Eagle Scout (Boy Scouts of America). He was profiled in the Winter 2019 issue of Eagles' Call magazine.

Cooper enlisted in the United States Army in 1976 and was assigned to the 3rd Ordnance Battalion, 32nd Air Defense Artillery Command with U.S. Army Europe and was later attached to the 5th Signal Command, USAREUR, and the U.S. Military Community Activity Worms, 21st Support Command.

While stationed in Germany in 1980, he was hit by a bus while riding a bicycle. As a result, he became paralyzed from the waist down.

Cooper received a B.S. degree in electrical engineering from California Polytechnic State University, San Luis Obispo in 1985 and an electrical engineering M.Eng. from Cal Poly in 1986. He received the Ph.D. degree in electrical and computer engineering with a concentration in bioengineering from University of California at Santa Barbara in 1989.

== Career ==
From 1989 to 1994, Cooper was an assistant professor in bioengineering at Sacramento State University. In 1994, Cooper became an associate professor at the Department of Rehabilitation Science and Technology in the School of Health and Rehabilitation Sciences at the University of Pittsburgh (obtaining full professorship in 1998). Also in 1994, he founded the Human Engineering Research Laboratories, which includes the VA Center for Wheelchairs and Assistive Robotics Engineering. He served as chair of the Department of Rehabilitation Science and Technology at the University of Pittsburgh from 1997 to 2018.

He is also a senior research career scientist with the United States Department of Veterans Affairs. Cooper is also the Director of the Department of Transportation-University Transportation Centers at the University of Pittsburgh.

Cooper has published just over 370 peer-reviewed journal articles. He is the author of Rehabilitation Engineering Applied to Mobility and Manipulation and Wheelchair Selection and Configuration and co-edited An Introduction to Rehabilitation Engineering, Care of the Combat Amputee, Warrior Transition Leader: Medical Rehabilitation Handbook., and Promoting Successful Reintegration.

Cooper has been a National Academies of Sciences Distinctive Voices Lecturer, ACC Distinguished Lecturer, Smithsonian Institution American Disabilities Act 25th Anniversary Festival Speaker, Young Lecturer at the Royal Military College of Canada, and inaugural American Association for the Advancement of Science-Lemelson Foundation Invention Ambassador. He has also been elected to Eta Kappa Nu, Tau Beta Pi, and Sigma Xi honorary societies. Cooper is a former president of RESNA, and a member of the IEEE-EMBS Medical Device Standards Committee. Additionally, he has been a member of the U.S. Centers for Medicare and Medicaid Services – Medicare Advisory Committee, U.S. Secretary of Veterans Affairs Prosthetics and Special Disability Programs Advisory Committee, chair of the National Advisory Board on Medical Rehabilitation Research, National Institute of Child Health & Human Development, U.S. Department of Defense Health Board Subcommittee on Amputation and Orthopedics, board of directors of Easter Seals, National Academy of Medicine Committee on Assistive Products and Devices, and National Academy of Sciences Keck Foundation Initiative on Human Health Span Steering Committee.

He is the director of the Paralyzed Veterans of America Research Foundation, and currently serves as a member of the Honorary Board of Advisors of the Student Veterans of America, chair of the honorary board of advisors of the Disabled Veterans National Foundation, National Science Foundation Advisory Committee for Education and Human Resources, Command Council of the Staff Sergeant Donnie D. Dixon Center for Military and Veterans Community Services, and World Health Organization GATE Committee. In 2021, Cooper was asked to serve on a new committee for the National Academies of Sciences, Medicine, Engineering, it will focus on improving accessibility and inclusion in Field, Laboratory, and Computational Science.

In 2014, Secretary of the Army John M. McHugh appointed Cooper a civilian aide to the Secretary of the Army.

== Inventions and patents ==
Cooper holds 25 patents in wheelchair technology. He is the inventor of many advanced mobility devices and assistive technologies. Among these are MEBot, a stair-climbing wheelchair; PneuChair, a wheelchair powered entirely by compressed air; and Virtual Seating Coach, a smartphone app to control power wheelchair seating systems.

The July 26, 2010 issue of Popular Science profiled Cooper, and a photo of him with a robotic wheelchair he invented was the issue's centerfold. Cooper and his inventions were also the cover story of the May 2017 issue of New Mobility. Additionally, Cooper was featured as the cover story of the September 2019 issue of Inventors Digest.

In 2021, Cooper appeared in two articles discussing his inventions. He was in Insight Into Diversity on August 18 discussing the evolution of assistive technology. Cooper discusses more innovations in a World Intellectual Property Organization (WIPO) feature in August 2021.

Cooper is an advocate for diversity within the invention community and in 2020 spoke to the U.S. Congress about American inventors' lack of diversity.

In 2021, Cooper served on the board for the National Academies of Sciences, Engineering, and Medicine, which authored a report on making air travel more accessible.

== Athletics ==
At the 1988 Paralympic Games in Seoul, South Korea, Cooper received a bronze medal in the 4x400-meter wheelchair relay.

Cooper was on the steering committee for the 1996 Paralympic Scientific Congress held in Atlanta, GA, and was the Sports Scientist for the 2008 U.S. Paralympic Team in Beijing, China. He also received the 2013 International Paralympic Scientific Achievement Award. He volunteered his expertise as a member of the US Paralympic staff in 1992, 1996, and 2008. Cooper has been selected to serve on the International Paralympic Committee Science and Research Working Group and the VISTA 2021 Scientific Committee.

Cooper served as the chair of the Local Organizing Committee for the National Veterans Wheelchair Games held in Pittsburgh, Pennsylvania in 1998 and 2011.

Cooper has been a competitor in the National Veterans Wheelchair Game since 1983 winning over 200 medals in total in such sports a slalom, track, swimming, table-tennis, and hand-cycle.

Cooper is an accomplished handcyclist and competes annually in the Pittsburgh Marathon.

== Recognition and awards ==
Cooper is an elected Fellow of the National Academy of Inventors, the American Association for the Advancement of Science, the Rehabilitation Engineering and Assistive Technology Society of North America, the Institute of Electrical and Electronics Engineers, the American Institute for Medical and Biological Engineering, and the Biomedical Engineering Society.

Cooper has received many honors; among the most recent are the National Medal of Technology and Innovation awarded by President Joe Biden, a 2017 Fellowship in the American Association for the Advancement of Science for engineering, recipient of one of the 2017 Samuel J. Heyman Service to America Medals, recognition as a "Health Hero" in Oprah Magazine, the 2016 Marlin Mickle Outstanding Innovator Award, and the Distinguished Eagle Scout Award in 2023.

Other awards Cooper has received include the Secretary of Defense Meritorious Civilian Service Medal, National Guard Bureau Minute Man Award, AAAS Mentor Award, Joseph F. Engelberger Award, AIMBE Advocacy Award, Henry Viscardi Achievement Award, Distinguished Civilian Service Medal (U.S. Army), U.S. Department of Veterans Affairs Diversity and Inclusion Excellence Award, Olin E. Teague Award, membership in the Pennsylvania Military and Veteran Hall of Fame, Order of Military Medical Merit, Order of Mercury, Order of Saint Maurice (United States), Chapel of Four Chaplains Legion of Honor, DaVinci Lifetime Achievement Award, and the Inaugural Class of the Spinal Cord Injury Hall of Fame.

In 2009, Cooper was featured on a special edition Cheerios cereal box to celebrate his accomplishments.

In appreciation of his work and accomplishments, the Pittsburgh City Council proclaimed June 17, 2014, as "Dr. Rory A. Cooper Day."

In 2019, the United States Patent and Trademark Office added Cooper to the Inventor Collectible Card Series.

Cooper, on his handcycle, appeared in the center of the October/November 2020 issue of AARP Magazine.

In 2021, Cooper was awarded the Sigma Xi John P. McGovern Award, which recognizes achievements by a scientist or engineer that transcend their career as a researcher

For his extensive contributions to wheelchair technology that have expanded mobility and reduced second hand injuries for millions of people with disabilities, Cooper was awarded the 2022 Institute of Electrical and Electronics Engineers (IEEE) Biomedical Engineering Award. In addition to the award, he was also awarded the 2022 RESNA Colin McLaurin distinguished Lectureship. At the 2022 AUSA Conference, Civilian Aides to the Secretary to the Army Program, which Cooper is a part of, received The General Creighton W. Abrams Medal. The award is for groups or individuals for exceptional service to the US Army.

In 2023, Dr. Cooper was inducted into the National Inventor Hall of Fame. He is being inducted with two patents. The first is No. 6,276,705 which is the Wheelchair hand rim and the second is No. 8,264,458 which is the Variable Compliance Joystick with Compensation Algorithms.

In 2024, he was inducted into the National Academy of Engineers and was named to the United States Olympian & Paralympian Association (USOPA) Executive Committee.
