= The International Engineering School =

Undergraduate school in Israel

The International Engineering School was an undergraduate school within the Engineering faculty at Tel Aviv University (TAU). The TAU International Engineering School, or the International School of Engineering, offered a Bachelor of Science in Electrical & Electronics Engineering, an 8-semester program delivered entirely in English. As of 2021, the program is now defunct, with the last class expected to graduate in 2024.

== Faculty ==
TAU's Faculty of Engineering was established six years ago by merging three research departments. Over 30 of the 52 Engineering Faculty members are fellows of international professional associations such as the IEEE. Moshe Kam, the current president of the IEEE, is an alumnus of the Engineering Faculty.

== Academic Ranking ==
According to the Academic Ranking of World Universities, TAU's Engineering faculty ranks in the top 100 in the world. According to the Academic Ranking, TAU performed #32 in Mathematics, between 51 and 75 in Physics and #28 in Computer Science.
