= IEEE Life Sciences =

- Founded: February 2011
- Type: Professional Organization
- Purpose: Life Sciences
- Location: Piscataway, New Jersey, U.S.
- Origins: Global initiative launched by IEEE
- Region served: Worldwide
- Method: Industry standards, Conferences, Publications, Education, and Web Portal, Marketing
- Key people: Moshe Kam, Initiative Champion; Bin He, Co-Chair; Mathukumalli Vidyasagar, Co-Chair; Bichlien Hoang, Program Director
- Website: lifesciences.ieee.org

IEEE Life Sciences is an initiative launched by IEEE to promote the advancement of life sciences and supporting technologies, and to provide expertise and resources to individuals and enterprises involved in the various disciplines falling under the life sciences umbrella. IEEE Life Sciences provides access to a range of resources, including professional conferences, continuing education courses, publications, and standards. It is based in Piscataway, New Jersey.

== History ==
In February 2011, the IEEE Board of Directors approved the formation of the Life Sciences Initiative with Moshe Kam, IEEE Fellow, and then IEEE President, as the Initiative Champion. The Initiative was led by two Co-Chairs, Mathukumalli Vidyasagar, an IEEE Fellow and Professor of Systems Biology Science at the University of Texas at Dallas and Bin He, Professor of Biomedical Engineering, Electrical Engineering, and Neuroscience; Director of Center for Neuroengineering at the University of Minnesota; and IEEE Fellow. It sought to increase interest in and participation of individuals and organizations working at the intersection of life sciences, technology, and engineering. The Initiative was also tasked with serving as a global resource for life sciences technologies, information, and activities, and to create new opportunities to introduce technology to new and different audiences and disciplines.

== Current work ==
Life sciences have historically been defined as the study of living organisms through disciplines such as biology, medicine, anthropology, and ecology, that describe living organisms and their organization, life processes, and their relationships to each other and their environment. By contrast, engineering is conventionally defined as the application of scientific and mathematical principles to practical ends such as the design, manufacture, and operation of efficient and economical structures, machines, processes, and systems.

Historically, life sciences and engineering did not intersect, however, the life sciences have now reached a point where engineering, physics, chemistry, biology, and clinical medicine are ready to be brought together. Additionally, the rise of new interdisciplinary areas like bioinformatics, computational biology, and nanotechnology have helped accelerate the growing convergence of these discrete disciplines. This convergence is important for achieving continued advancement in multiple areas like biomedicine, and development of the next generation of devices capable of improving the quality of life.

The IEEE Life Sciences Initiative leads or participates in a variety of activities, including the development of new standards, organizing conferences and events, and publication of new research. Individuals and organizations taking part in the Initiative are also often quoted or have works published in third-party trade journals and magazines, such as Genetic Engineering and Biotechnology News. Work currently being performed as part of the IEEE Life Sciences Initiative includes:

=== IEEE Life Sciences Portal ===
As part of its efforts to serve the life sciences community, the IEEE Life Sciences portal was launched in June 2011. Serving as a single point of access, the IEEE Life Sciences portal provides news, links to key journals, discussion boards, commentary, event information, and videos to diverse audiences that include engineers, scientists, consumers, business and industry, academic, and government users. It is also the online home of the monthly IEEE Life Sciences Newsletter.

=== Conferences and events ===
The IEEE Life Sciences Initiative promotes numerous conferences, symposiums, and other events organized and sponsored by its participating societies. These events are designed to promote discussion of critical issues in the life sciences arena, educate participants on the latest technology developments, and facilitate idea and knowledge-sharing about life sciences concepts, deployments, and technology advancement. Conference programs generally consist of educational tracks with keynote speeches, panel discussions, and roundtables led by researchers, engineers, academics, policymakers, and other key stakeholders.

The initiative's flagship event is the annual IEEE Life Sciences Grand Challenges Conference (IEEE LSGCC), which aims to provide a public forum for discussions and debates of grand challenges in engineering life sciences and healthcare, and reviews of applications and advancements of engineering in biomedicine. The inaugural IEEE LSGCC, chaired by Bin He, was held at the National Academy of Sciences, Washington, D.C., on October 4–5, 2012, and attracted scientists and technologists like Nobel Prize winner Phillip Sharp from countries around the world. Proceedings of this first-ever IEEE LSGCC were presented in a paper entitled Grand Challenges in Interfacing Engineering With Life Sciences and Medicine.

The IEEE Life Sciences Initiative also participates in or is a sponsor of other life sciences conferences and events, including BIO, Bio-IT World, the International Conference on System Biology, and IEEE Smart Tech Metro Area Workshops.

=== Publications ===
As part of the IEEE Life Sciences Initiative, IEEE societies, working groups, committees and sub-committees publish papers, manuscripts, journals and magazines, and other documents addressing a variety of topics. These publications touch nearly every aspect of the engineering, life sciences, and technology disciplines, and include titles like IEEE Nanotechnology Magazine, IEEE Transactions on Biomedical Engineering, IEEE Transactions on Information Technology in Biomedicine, and IEEE Transactions on Neural Systems and Rehabilitation Engineering.

==== IEEE Life Sciences Newsletter ====
In April 2012, IEEE unveiled the IEEE Life Sciences Newsletter, a monthly electronic digest providing news, analysis and expert views about emerging trends, latest innovations, and the results of practical, real-world life sciences applications. Contributors include industry leaders, researchers, and academics from around the world. Nitish Thakor, Professor of Biomedical Engineering at Johns Hopkins University, Baltimore, and Director of the Singapore Institute for Neurotechnology (SiNAPSE), at the National University of Singapore is editor-in-chief of the newsletter.

=== IEEE Life Sciences Community ===
The IEEE Life Sciences Community is a virtual community of more than 2,000 people interested in the application of technology and engineering principles to the life sciences discipline. The community supplies news and event information from those societies and councils taking part in the IEEE Life Sciences Initiative.

== Related IEEE societies ==
The IEEE Life Sciences Initiative is home to numerous societies, technical councils and communities, and other organizational units that are active in life sciences-related work. Among the disciplines or specialized fields of interest covered by these groups are electronic systems, medicine and biology engineering, and robotics.

== See also ==
- Bioengineering
- Bioinformatics
- Biopharmaceutics
- Biotechnology
- Computational biology
- Nanotechnology
- Neuroengineering
