= Proceedings of the IEEE =

Scientific journal

- Discipline: Electrical engineering, electronics, computer technology
- Language: English
- Edited by: Gianluca Setti

Publication details
- Former name: Proceedings of the IRE
- History: 1913–present
- Publisher: Institute of Electrical and Electronics Engineers
- Frequency: Monthly
- Impact factor: 10.694 (2018)

Standard abbreviations
- ISO 4: Proc. IEEE

Indexing
- CODEN: IEEPAD
- ISSN: 0018-9219
- LCCN: 86645263
- OCLC no.: 807623131

Links
- Journal homepage; Online access

The Proceedings of the IEEE is a monthly peer-reviewed scientific journal published by the Institute of Electrical and Electronics Engineers (IEEE). The journal focuses on electrical engineering and computer science. According to the Journal Citation Reports, the journal has a 2017 impact factor of 9.107, ranking it sixth in the category "Engineering, Electrical & Electronic." In 2018, it became fifth with an enhanced impact factor of 10.694.

== History of the Proceedings ==
The journal was established in 1909, known as the Proceedings of the Wireless Institute. Six issues were published under this banner by Greenleaf Pickard and Alfred Goldsmith. Then in 1911, a merger between the Wireless Institute (New York) and the Society of Wireless Telegraph Engineers (Boston) resulted in a society named the Institute of Radio Engineers (IRE).

In January 1913 newly formed IRE published the first issue of the Proceedings of the IRE. Later, a 1000-page special issue commemorated the IRE's fiftieth anniversary in May 1962. One of the founding editors, Alfred Norton Goldsmith, tallied 42 years as the first editor-in-chief. When the IEEE was formed in 1963 as a merger of IRE and the American Institute of Electrical Engineers, the journal obtained its current name.

== Journal content ==
The Proceedings of the IEEE provides in-depth review, survey, and tutorial coverage of the technical developments in electronics, electrical and computer engineering, and computer science.

- Reviews critically examine a technology, tracing its progress from its inception to the present—and perhaps into the future.
- Surveys comprehensively view a technology—its applications, issues, ramifications, and potential.
- Tutorials explain the technology and may give practical information for implementing it.

The journal offers applications-oriented coverage that goes beyond the traditional boundaries typically found in other journals.

== Special issues and regular papers ==
The journal publishes approximately ten Special Issues and two regular paper issues per year.

Special Issues are led by distinguished Guest Editor teams and contain articles from leading experts in the technology area being covered. They serve as a guide to the state-of-the-art and are highly valued by the core research community as well as specialists in other areas.

Regular Paper Issues consist of three to four papers on more focused topics, giving readers background and insight into emerging areas.

== Abstracting and indexing ==
This journal is indexed by the following services:

- Science Citation Index
- Science Citation Index Expanded
- Current Contents / Engineering, Computing & Technology
- Chemical Abstracts Service - CASSI
