= Nimmi Ramanujam =

Biomedical engineer and women's cancer researcher

- Education: University of Texas at Austin (PhD)
- Known for: Pocket colposcope and Callascope; Center for Global Women's Health Technologies; WISH consortium
- Awards: IEEE Biomedical Engineering Award (2023); Social Impact Abie Award (2019); Fulbright Global Scholar (2019); SPIE Biophotonics Technology Innovator Award (2020); Optica Michael S. Feld Biophotonics Award (2020)
- Scientific career
- Fields: Biomedical engineering Biophotonics; Women's cancers Global health
- Workplaces: Duke University
- Website: bme.duke.edu/faculty/nimmi-ramanujam dukegwht.org

Nirmala (Nimmi) Ramanujam is an Indian-Malaysian-American biomedical engineer whose research focuses on developing accessible technologies for cervical and breast cancer screening, diagnosis, and treatment in low-resource settings. She is the Robert W. Carr Professor of Engineering and Professor of Cancer Pharmacology and Global Health at Duke University, where she founded the Center for Global Women's Health Technologies (GWHT) in 2013.

Ramanujam is a fellow of the National Academy of Inventors, the American Institute for Medical and Biological Engineering, Optica, and the Society of Photo-Optical Instrumentation Engineers, and a Fulbright Global Scholar. In 2023, she received the IEEE Biomedical Engineering Technical Field Award. In 2019, she received the Social Impact Abie Award from AnitaB.org.

== Early life ==
Ramanujam grew up primarily in Kuala Lumpur, Malaysia, with brief periods in Mysore and Bangalore, India. Her mother, a veena player, introduced her to music at a young age, and Ramanujam began studying the instrument at five. She performed on radio broadcasts and at concerts throughout her school years. In interviews, she has described parallels between her musical training and her approach to engineering, noting that both involve envisioning a solution before developing the technical means to achieve it.

== Education and career ==
Ramanujam received her Ph.D. from the University of Texas at Austin. She subsequently held positions as a research scientist and postdoctoral fellow at the University of Pennsylvania and as an assistant professor at the University of Wisconsin–Madison before joining the Department of Biomedical Engineering at Duke University as an associate professor. She was promoted to full professor in 2011.

=== Cancer screening and treatment technologies ===
Ramanujam's research centers on transforming complex diagnostic instruments into lower-cost, portable alternatives suitable for use in under-resourced healthcare settings. Her technologies are used in clinical settings in the United States, Latin America, and Africa, through partnerships with academic institutions, hospitals, non-governmental organizations, and ministries of health.

Her best-known invention is the Pocket colposcope, a low-cost portable device for cervical cancer imaging that is included on the World Health Organization's list of recommended devices for cervical cancer screening. A related device, the Callascope, is a speculum-free, self-use imaging tool designed to allow cervical self-screening without a pelvic examination.

Other technologies developed by her research group include the CapCell Scope, a translational microscope designed to identify metabolic biomarkers associated with tumor behavior in breast cancer, and an injectable liquid-based ablation therapy intended as a low-cost alternative to surgery for tumor treatment.

Ramanujam founded Calla Health, a company that commercializes technologies developed at the Center for Global Women's Health Technologies.

=== WISH consortium ===
Ramanujam leads the Women Inspired Strategies for Health (WISH) consortium, which works to improve cervical cancer prevention in low-resource settings. The consortium develops see-and-treat strategies for areas with limited clinical infrastructure. WISH was named one of the top 100 proposals in the MacArthur Foundation's 100&Change competition.

=== Education and outreach initiatives ===
Ramanujam created the (In)visible Organ project, an arts and storytelling initiative addressing stigma around sexual and reproductive health. The project includes an educational documentary that was an official selection at the Women at the Center Film Festival at the International Papillomavirus Conference in 2020, as well as an art exhibition combining visual arts, medical photography, sculptures, and installations.

She also developed IGNITE, a global education program that integrates design thinking, STEM concepts, and the United Nations Sustainable Development Goals. The curriculum has been implemented in more than four countries; projects have included student-designed water purification systems near Lake Atitlán in Guatemala and renewable-energy flashlights in Muhuru Bay, Kenya.

== Awards and honors ==
- MIT TR100 Award, 2003
- MIT Global Indus Technovator Award, 2005
- Department of Defense Era of Hope Scholar Award, 2005
- Department of Defense Era of Hope Research Scholar Award, 2009
- Fellow, Optical Society of America, 2009
- Stansell Research Award, Duke University, 2011
- Fellow, American Institute for Medical and Biological Engineering, 2012
- Fellow, SPIE, 2013
- Fellow, National Academy of Inventors, 2017
- Emerging Global Health Leader Award, Consortium of Universities for Global Health, 2017
- Social Impact Abie Award, AnitaB.org, 2019
- Fulbright Global Scholar, 2019
- WIMIN Leadership Award, World Molecular Imaging Society, 2019
- SPIE Biophotonics Technology Innovator Award, 2020
- Optica Michael S. Feld Biophotonics Award, 2020
- IEEE Biomedical Engineering Award, 2023
