= IEEE Haraden Pratt Award =

- Awarded for: Outstanding service to the IEEE
- First award: 1971
- Website: IEEE Haraden Pratt Award

The IEEE Haraden Pratt Award was established by the IEEE Board of Directors in 1971 in honor of Haraden Pratt. This award is presented to recognize individuals who have rendered outstanding volunteer service to the IEEE.

This award is presented to an IEEE Senior Member or Fellow.

Following people received the IEEE Haraden Pratt Award:

== Recipients ==
- 2023: Marko Delimar
- 2022: Joseph V. Lillie
- 2021: Evelyn N. Hirt
- 2020: Mary Ellen Randall
- 2019: David Green
- 2018: Loretta J. Arellano
- 2017: John T. Barr
- 2016: Moshe Kam
- 2015: Fumio Harashima
- 2014: V. Prasad Kodali
- 2013: Barry L. Shoop
- 2012: Hugh Rudnick
- 2011: Levent Onural
- 2010: Raymond D. Findlay
- 2008: Maurice Papo
- 2007: Luis T. Gandia
- 2006: Antonio C. Bastos
- 2005: Daniel Benigni
- 2004: Jerry Yeargan
- 2003: Charles Turner
- 2002: Robert T. H. Alden
- 2001: Arthur P. Stern
- 2000: Charles A. Eldon
- 1999: Vijay K. Bhargava
- 1998: Frederick T. Andrews
- 1997: Robert A. Rivers
- 1996: Walter E. Proebster
- 1995: Henry L. Bachman
- 1994: Ronald G. Hoelzeman
- 1993: Harold S. Goldberg
- 1992: Richard J. Backe
- 1991: Thelma Estrin
- 1990: Robert M. Saunders
- 1989: Edward J. Doyle
- 1988: Irene C. Peden
- 1987: Robert F. Cotellessa
- 1986: Robert C. Winton
- 1985: Donald S. Brereton
- 1984: William W. Middleton
- 1983: Thomas H. Lee
- 1981: Robert H. Tanner
- 1980: Raymond W. Sears
- 1979: John D. Ryder
- 1978: Ivan S. Coggeshall
- 1976: Clarence H. Linder
- 1975: Walter J. Barrett
- 1974: James H. Mulligan, Jr.
- 1973: Elgin B. Robertson, Sr.
- 1972: Alfred N. Goldsmith
