= Henry L. Bachman =

American electrical engineer

- Born: April 29, 1930 (age 95); Brooklyn, New York, U.S.
- Education: Electrical engineering
- Alma mater: New York University Tandon School of Engineering
- Known for: President of IEEE in 1987; Vice President of BAE Systems
- Awards: IEEE Haraden Pratt Award

Henry L. Bachman (born April 29, 1930) is an American electrical engineer who was the president of IEEE in 1987. He is a Fellow of the IEEE. He received the IEEE Haraden Pratt Award in 1995. He has served as Vice President of BAE Systems. He graduated from Brooklyn Technical High School and New York University Tandon School of Engineering obtaining the BSEE and MSEE degrees in 1951 and 1954, respectively. He attended the six-week Advanced Management Program at Harvard University School of Business in 1972.
