= Bin He =

Chinese American biomedical engineering scientist

- Education: Zhejiang University (BS); Tokyo Institute of Technology (MS, PhD)
- Known for: Noninvasive EEG-based brain–computer interfaces; 3D EEG neuroimaging
- Awards: IEEE Biomedical Engineering Award (2017); President, IEEE Engineering in Medicine and Biology Society (2009–2010); Fellow, IEEE, AIMBE, BMES, IAMBE, NAI
- Scientific career
- Fields: Biomedical engineering; Neuroengineering; Electroencephalography; Brain–computer interfaces
- Workplaces: Carnegie Mellon University (2018–present); University of Minnesota (2004–2018); University of Illinois at Chicago; Massachusetts Institute of Technology (postdoctoral/research scientist)

Bin He is a Chinese American biomedical engineering scientist. He is the Trustee Professor of the Department of Biomedical Engineering, professor by courtesy in the Department of Electrical and Computer Engineering, and Professor of Neuroscience Institute, and was the head of the department of Biomedical Engineering at Carnegie Mellon University. Prior, he was Distinguished McKnight University Professor of Biomedical Engineering and Medtronic-Bakken Endowed Chair for Engineering in Medicine at the University of Minnesota. He previously served as the director of the Institute for Engineering in Medicine and the Center for Neuroengineering at the University of Minnesota. He was the Editor in Chief of the IEEE Transactions on Biomedical Engineering and serves as the editor in chief of IEEE Reviews in Biomedical Engineering. He was the president of the IEEE Engineering in Medicine & Biology Society (EMBS) from 2009 to 2010 and chair of International Academy of Medical and Biological Engineering from 2018 to 2021.

== Biography ==
Bin He received his BS in 1982 in electrical engineering, from Zhejiang University, Hangzhou, China. He later went to study in Japan and obtained his M.S. in electrical engineering and PhD (highest honors) in bioelectrical engineering from the Tokyo Institute of Technology.

Bin He completed his postdoctoral fellowship at Harvard-MIT Division of Health Sciences and Technology in the United States. After working as a Research Scientist at MIT, he later joined the faculty of Electrical Engineering and Bioengineering at the University of Illinois at Chicago, where Bin He was named a University Scholar by the university president.

In January 2004, Bin He became the Professor of Biomedical Engineering, Electrical Engineering, and Neuroscience at the University of Minnesota, Minneapolis. He also served as the founding director of Center for Neuroengineering at Minnesota. Since 2011, Bin He has served as the director of the NSF IGERT Training Program on Systems Neuroengineering. In August 2012, Bin He was named the director of the Institute for Engineering in Medicine, a campus-wide research institute aimed at advancing innovative engineering solutions for tomorrow's medicine, by fostering collaborations between biomedical colleges and College of Science and Engineering at the University of Minnesota.

Bin He's research has helped transform electroencephalography (EEG) from a one-dimensional detection technique to a three-dimensional neuroimaging modality. His laboratory demonstrated the ability for humans to fly a drone and control a robotic arm through noninvasive brain-computer interface (BCI) technology.

He has contributed to neuroengineering education, including editing the first textbook in neural engineering. He has also led training grants in neuroengineering funded by the National Institutes of Health (NIH) and the National Science Foundation (NSF).

Bin He served as the past president of the IEEE Engineering in Medicine and Biology Society and as the chair of the International Academy of Medical and Biological Engineering. He also served as the Editor-in-Chief of IEEE Transactions on Biomedical Engineering and currently serves as the Editor-in-Chief of IEEE Reviews in Biomedical Engineering.

He directs the Biomedical Functional Imaging and Neuroengineering Laboratory, which was founded at the University of Minnesota and relocated to Carnegie Mellon University in 2018. He stepped down from his position of the Head of the Biomedical Engineering Department in 2021, and was succeeded by Keith Cook.

== Research ==
He's research focuses on neuroengineering, particularly in the areas of functional neuroimaging, neural interfacing, and neuromodulation. His lab develops noninvasive dynamic brain imaging technology to study motor and visual systems' mechanisms. One of his active research projects involves developing novel techniques for localizing and imaging epileptic seizures from noninvasive EEG, MEG, and intracranial EEG to aid surgical resection. Additionally, his lab investigates functional brain networks using EEG, MEG, and functional MRI to understand brain functions and aid in clinical management.

Another major area of research for He is the development of noninvasive mind-controlled brain-computer interfaces to aid disabled patients. His lab explores engineering solutions using motor imagery, spatial attention, and other techniques to develop BCI as a broadly used assistive technology.

He’s lab develop and investigate transcranial focused ultrasound neuromodulation, a recently introduced technology that delivers acoustic waves to targeted brain areas with high spatial precision.

== Awards ==
- Earl Bakken Lecture, American Institute of Medical and Biological Engineering, 2024
- Editor-in-Chief: IEEE Reviews in Biomedical Engineering, 2023 -
- IEEE EMBS William J Morlock Award, 2019
- Chair, International Academy of Medical and Biological Engineering, 2018 - 2021
- Editor-in-Chief: IEEE Transactions on Biomedical Engineering, 2013 - 2018
- IEEE Biomedical Engineering Award, 2017
- Academic Career Achievement Award, IEEE Engineering in Medicine and Biology Society, 2015
- Distinguished Service Award, IEEE Engineering in Medicine and Biology Society, 2014
- President, IEEE Engineering in Medicine and Biology Society, 2009 - 2010
- Fellow, AIMBE, BMES, IAMBE, IEEE, NAI

== Media Reports ==
- NIH/NIBIB Science Highlights: New imaging method tracks brain’s elusive networks
- NEXTpittsburgh: "The brilliant Carnegie Mellon researcher who is innovating mind-controlled robotics"
- The Wall Street Journal: “Moving Robots with just a Thought"
- NIH Record: “He Describes Advances in Mapping Brain Dynamics”
- Nature: “Toy Helicopter Guided by Power of Thought"
- BBC: “Thought-guided Helicopter Takes Off"

== Selected publications ==
- LaFleur, Karl; Cassady, Kaitlin; Doud, Alexander; Shades, Kaleb; Rogin, Eitan; He, Bin (2013-08). "Quadcopter control in three-dimensional space using a noninvasive motor imagery-based brain-computer interface". Journal of Neural Engineering. 10 (4): 046003. doi:10.1088/1741-2560/10/4/046003.
- Babiloni, F.; Cincotti, F.; Babiloni, C.; Carducci, F.; Mattia, D.; Astolfi, L.; Basilisco, A.; Rossini, P. M.; Ding, L.; Ni, Y.; Cheng, J.; Christine, K.; Sweeney, J.; He, B. (2005-01-01). "Estimation of the cortical functional connectivity with the multimodal integration of high-resolution EEG and fMRI data by directed transfer function". NeuroImage. 24 (1): 118–131. doi:10.1016/j.neuroimage.2004.09.036.
- Yuan, Han; He, Bin (2014-05). "Brain-computer interfaces using sensorimotor rhythms: current state and future perspectives". IEEE transactions on bio-medical engineering. 61 (5): 1425–1435. doi:10.1109/TBME.2014.2312397.
- Meng, Jianjun; Zhang, Shuying; Bekyo, Angeliki; Olsoe, Jaron; Baxter, Bryan; He, Bin (2016-12-14). "Noninvasive Electroencephalogram Based Control of a Robotic Arm for Reach and Grasp Tasks". Scientific Reports. 6 (1): 38565. doi:10.1038/srep38565.
- Seeck, Margitta; Koessler, Laurent; Bast, Thomas; Leijten, Frans; Michel, Christoph; Baumgartner, Christoph; He, Bin; Beniczky, Sándor (2017-10). "The standardized EEG electrode array of the IFCN". Clinical Neurophysiology: Official Journal of the International Federation of Clinical Neurophysiology. 128 (10): 2070–2077. doi:10.1016/j.clinph.2017.06.254.
- Astolfi, Laura; Cincotti, Febo; Mattia, Donatella; Marciani, M. Grazia; Baccala, Luiz A.; de Vico Fallani, Fabrizio; Salinari, Serenella; Ursino, Mauro; Zavaglia, Melissa; Ding, Lei; Edgar, J. Christopher; Miller, Gregory A.; He, Bin; Babiloni, Fabio (2007-02). "Comparison of different cortical connectivity estimators for high-resolution EEG recordings". Human Brain Mapping. 28 (2): 143–157. doi:10.1002/hbm.20263.
- He, Bin; Musha, Toshimitsu; Okamoto, Yoshiwo; Homma, Saburo; Nakajima, Yoshio; Sato, Toshio (1987-06). "Electric Dipole Tracing in the Brain by Means of the Boundary Element Method and Its Accuracy". IEEE Transactions on Biomedical Engineering. BME-34 (6): 406–414. doi:10.1109/TBME.1987.326056.
- Edelman, Bradley J.; Baxter, Bryan; He, Bin (2016-01). "EEG Source Imaging Enhances the Decoding of Complex Right-Hand Motor Imagery Tasks". IEEE transactions on bio-medical engineering. 63 (1): 4–14. doi:10.1109/TBME.2015.2467312.
- Wilke, Christopher; Worrell, Gregory; He, Bin (2011-01). "Graph analysis of epileptogenic networks in human partial epilepsy". Epilepsia. 52 (1): 84–93. doi:10.1111/j.1528-1167.2010.02785.x.
