= IEEE Biomedical Engineering Award =

- Awarded for: outstanding contributions to the field of biomedical engineering
- Sponsored by: Institute of Electrical and Electronics Engineers
- First award: 2013
- Website: IEEE Biomedical Engineering Award

The IEEE Biomedical Engineering Award is a Technical Field Award of the IEEE given annually for outstanding contributions to the field of biomedical engineering. It was established in 2010.

The award is sponsored by the IEEE Engineering in Medicine and Biology Society, the IEEE Circuits and Systems Society, and the IEEE Computational Intelligence Society. Recipients of this award receive a bronze medal, certificate and a cash honorarium.

== Recipients ==
Past recipients and award citations are listed on the IEEE website.

- 2013: Robert Plonsey, "for developing quantitative methods to characterize the electromagnetic fields in excitable tissue, leading to a better understanding of the electrophysiology of nerve, muscle, and brain". Plonsey retired from Duke University in 1996 as Professor Emeritus of Biomedical Engineering.
- 2014: Lihong Wang, "for pioneering photoacoustic tomography". Wang is Distinguished Professor of Biomedical Engineering at Washington University in St. Louis, Missouri, United States.
- 2015: Christofer Toumazou, "for outstanding contributions to biomedical circuit technology." He is Regius Professor of Engineering at Imperial College London and has developed numerous medical devices that have revolutionised healthcare.
- 2016: K. Kirk Shung, "for contributions to ultrasound imaging and transducer technology". Shung is Dean's Professor in Biomedical Engineering at University of Southern California.
- 2017: Bin He, "for contributions to neuroengineering and neuroimaging". Bin He is Distinguished Professor of Biomedical Engineering at University of Minnesota.
- 2018: Mark S. Humayun, "for contributions to the bioelectronic retinal implant". Humayun is Professor of Biomedical Engineering at University of Southern California.
- 2019: Matthew O’Donnell, "for leadership in biomedical ultrasonics and medical imaging technologies". O'Donnell is Professor of Bioengineering at University of Washington.
- 2020: F. Stuart Foster, "for contributions to the field of high-resolution imaging". Foster is Senior Scientist and Professor at the Sunnybrook Research Institute of University of Toronto.
- 2021: Katherine Whittaker Ferrara, "for the integration of ultrasound and engineered vesicles in the diagnosis and treatment of cancer". Ferrara is Distinguished Professor of Biomedical Engineering, University of California, Davis, California, USA
- 2022: Rory A. Cooper, "for extensive contributions to wheelchair technology that have expanded mobility and reduced secondary injuries for millions of people with disabilities". FISA/PVA Distinguished Professor, University of Pittsburgh
- 2023: Nirmala Ramanujam, "for more globally accessible technology for women's health related to cancer screening, diagnosis, and treatment". Ramanujam is the Robert W. Carr Professor of Engineering and Professor of Cancer Pharmacology and Global Health at Duke University, where she founded the Center for Global Women's Health Technologies (GWHT) in 2013. Her research is focused on transforming complex diagnostic instruments into lower-cost, portable alternatives suitable for use in under-resourced healthcare settings.
- 2024: John A. Rogers, "for multi-disciplinary contributions in the life sciences, physical sciences, engineering, and medicine to enable the integration of biology and electronics". Rogers' research seeks to exploit characteristics of 'soft' materials, such as polymers, liquid crystals, and biological tissues as well as hybrid combinations of them with unusual classes of micro/nanomaterials, in the form of ribbons, wires, membranes, tubes or related structural shapes.
- 2025: Kam W. Leong, "for pioneering contributions to bionanotechnology that transformed therapies with drug and gene delivery, gene editing, and anti-inflammation nanomaterials".
- 2026: Roger G. Mark and George B. Moody, "for leadership in ECG signal processing and global dissemination of curated biomedical and clinical databases, thereby accelerating biomedical research worldwide.
- 2027: Kullervo Hynynen, "for pioneering contributions to the development, advancement, and clinical translation of therapeutic ultrasound".
