= Alfred Norton Goldsmith =

American electrical engineer (1888–1974)

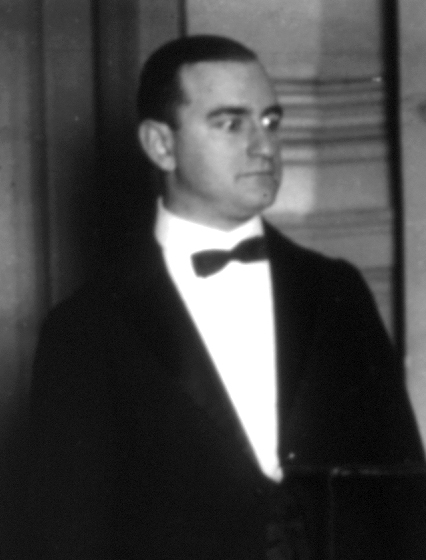
- Goldsmith in 1922
- Born: September 15, 1888; New York City, U.S.
- Died: July 2, 1974 (aged 85)
- Education: College of the City of New York; Columbia University
- Awards: IEEE Medal of Honor (1941); IEEE Founders Medal (1954)
- Scientific career
- Fields: Electrical engineering

Alfred Norton Goldsmith (September 15, 1888 – July 2, 1974) was a noted American electrical engineer.

Goldsmith was born in New York City, received his B.S. in 1907 from the College of the City of New York and in 1911 his Ph.D. from Columbia University where he studied under Michael I. Pupin. He taught at City College from 1906 to 1923. In 1912 Goldsmith co-founded the Institute of Radio Engineers (IRE) and was the first editor of its proceedings, serving for 42 years. In 1914 he consulted as a radio engineer for the Atlantic Communication Company, and for the General Electric Company from 1915 to 1917. During World War I he was Technical Director of the United States Army Signal Corps School of Communication and the U. S. Naval Radio School at City College.

After the war, Goldsmith became director of research for the Marconi Wireless Telegraph Company of America and in 1919 RCA's director of research. In 1923 he was named RCA's Chief Broadcast Engineer and in 1927 Chairman of the Board of Consulting Engineers of the National Broadcasting Company. He remained with RCA as vice president and general manager until 1931, and was awarded RCA's first production television tube with an inscription reading "RCA Laboratory’s Award for Outstanding Work in Research presented to Alfred Norton Goldsmith for his early recognition of the importance of a tri-color kinescope and for his concept of means for accomplishing it."

Goldsmith was made an IRE Fellow in 1915, its president in 1928, and served on its board of directors for 51 years. In 1941 he was awarded the IRE Medal of Honor "for his contributions to radio research, engineering, and commercial development, his leadership in standardization, and his unceasing devotion to the establishment and upbuilding of the Institute and its proceedings", the IEEE Founders Medal in 1954, and the first IEEE Haraden Pratt Award in 1972, to honor "outstanding service to the IEEE."

Goldsmith was also a Fellow of the Acoustical Society of America, the American Association for the Advancement of Science, the American Rocket Society, the Institution of Radio Engineers, Australia, the International College of Surgeons, the New York Academy of Sciences, the Optical Society of America, and was a Benjamin Franklin Fellow of the Royal Society of Arts (London). He was also a senior member in the American Astronomical Society, as well as a member of the American Physical Society, and an honorary member of the Society of Motion Picture and Television Engineers.

Since 1975 the Alfred N. Goldsmith Award for Distinguished Contributions to Engineering Communication Award has been given by IEEE Professional Communication Society in his honor.
