= John A. Rogers =

Chemist and materials scientist

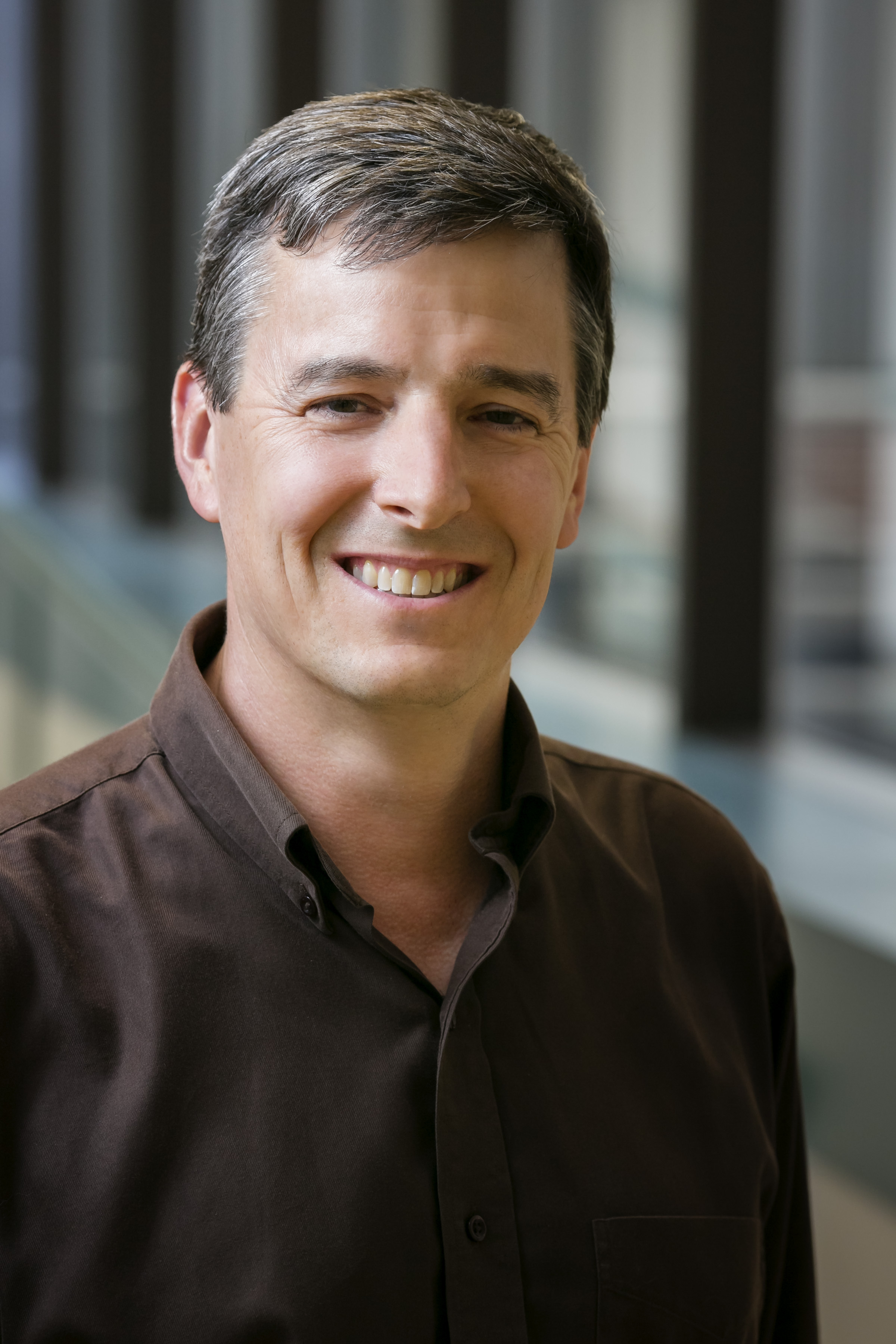
- Born: August 24, 1967 (age 59); Rolla, Missouri, U.S.
- Education: University of Texas at Austin (BA, BS); Massachusetts Institute of Technology (MS, PhD)
- Known for: soft lithography, microfabrication, microfluidics, nanotechnology, flexible electronics, bioelectronics.
- Awards: MacArthur Fellow (2009); Lemelson–MIT Prize (2011); ASME Thurston Lecture Award (2013); Eringen Medal (2014); MRS Medal (2018); Benjamin Franklin Medal (2019); Guggenheim Fellow (2021); IEEE Biomedical Engineering Award (2024)
- Scientific career
- Fields: Materials Science, Bioengineering
- Workplaces: University of Illinois; Northwestern University
- Doctoral advisor: Keith A. Nelson
- Other academic advisors: George M. Whitesides (postdoctoral advisor)
- Doctoral students: Canan Dağdeviren

John Ashley Rogers (born August 24, 1967) is an American physical chemist and a materials scientist. He is currently the Louis Simpson and Kimberly Querrey Professor of Materials Science and Engineering, Biomedical Engineering, and Neurological Surgery at Northwestern University.

== Professional career ==
Rogers obtained BA and BS degrees in chemistry and in physics from the University of Texas, Austin in 1989, followed by SM degrees in physics and in chemistry from MIT in 1992 and a PhD degree in physical chemistry from MIT in 1995. He was a Junior Fellow in the Harvard Society of Fellows from 1995 to 1997, during which time he worked in the laboratory of George M. Whitesides.

He joined the Bell Laboratories as a Member of Technical Staff in the Condensed Matter Physics Research Department in 1997 and served as Director of that department from the end of 2000 through the end of 2002. In 2003 he joined the University of Illinois at Urbana–Champaign as Founder Professor of Engineering, with appointments in the Department of Materials Science and Engineering and the Department of Chemistry. In 2008 he was named the Flory-Founder Chair in Engineering Innovation, and assumed affiliate appointments with the Department of Mechanical Science and Engineering and the Department of Electrical and Computer Engineering. From 2010-2012 he was Director of the NSF NSEC Center on Nanomanufacturing. In 2012, he was appointed to a Swanlund Chair, the highest chaired position at the university and he assumed the position of Director of the Seitz Materials Research Laboratory. He moved to Northwestern University in the Fall of 2016 as the first Louis Simpson and Kimberly Querrey Professor, with appointments in the Department of Materials Science and Engineering, the Department of Biomedical Engineering, and the Department of Neurological Surgery, as well as affiliate appointments in the Department of Chemistry, the Department of Mechanical Engineering, the Department of Electrical and Computer Engineering, and the Department of Dermatology. He also became the first Director of the newly endowed Center for Bio-Integrated Electronics, later elevated to the Institute of Bioelectronics in 2019 through an additional contribution to the endowment by Kimberly Querrey and Louis Simpson, trustees at Northwestern University.

== Current research ==
Rogers' research seeks to exploit characteristics of 'soft' materials, such as polymers, liquid crystals, and biological tissues as well as hybrid combinations of them with unusual classes of micro/nanomaterials, in the form of ribbons, wires, membranes, tubes or related structural shapes. The aim is to control and induce novel electronic and photonic responses in these materials; and also develop new 'soft lithographic' and biomimetic approaches for patterning them and guiding their growth. This work combines fundamental studies with forward-looking engineering efforts in a way that promotes positive feedback between the two. Current research focuses on soft materials for conformal electronics, nanophotonic structures, microfluidic devices, and microelectromechanical systems, all lately with an emphasis on bio-inspired and bio-integrated technologies. Applications of this research have included dissolvable, wireless pacemakers, optogenetic brain implants, and environmental sensors.

== Awards and achievements ==
Rogers' research deals with nano and molecular scale fabrication, materials, and patterning techniques for electronic and photonic devices, lately with a strong emphasis on bio-integrated and bio-inspired systems. He has published ~1000 papers (~250,000 citations, per Google Scholar), and is an inventor on over 100 patents and patent applications, more than 50 of which are licensed or in current use. More than 160 former PhD students and postdoctoral fellows from his group are now in faculty positions at some of the most competitive institutions in the world: Stanford, MIT, Northwestern, Duke, Dartmouth, Univ. Illinois, Georgia Tech, Univ Southern Calif, Penn State, Texas A&M Univ, Purdue Univ, NCSU and many others in the US; TU Delft, ETH, Univ. Heidelberg and others in Europe; Tsinghua Univ, Peking Univ, USTC and many others in China; Seoul National Univ, KAIST, Yonsei Univ and many others in Korea. He is one of ~25 people in history to have been elected to all three US national academies—National Academy of Engineering, National Academy of Sciences and National Academy of Medicine. He is also a member of the Royal Society - one of three living individuals with membership in these four academies of sciences.

== Selected honors ==
- MacArthur Fellowship (2009)
- Lemelson-MIT Prize (2011)
- Member, National Academy of Engineering (2011)
- Robert Henry Thurston Lecture Award from the American Society of Mechanical Engineers(2013),
- Inducted as a Laureate of The Lincoln Academy of Illinois and awarded the Order of Lincoln (the State's highest honor) by the Governor of Illinois on November 6, 2021.
- Doctorate honoris causa from the École polytechnique fédérale de Lausanne (EPFL). (2013), the University of Houston (2021) and the University of Missouri at Columbia (2022)
- Foreign Member of the Royal Society (2025)
- IEEE Biomedical Engineering Award (2024) "for multi-disciplinary contributions in the life sciences, physical sciences, engineering, and medicine to enable the integration of biology and electronics"
