= Vijay Bhargava =

Canadian engineer

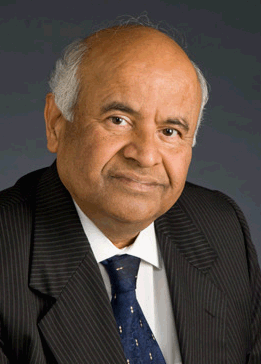
- Vijay
- Born: 22 September 1948 (age 78); Beawar, Rajasthan, India
- Awards: 2015- Canadian Council Killam Price Laureate in Engineering, University of British Columbia 2014 - Canadian Award for Telecommunications Research; 2012 - IEEE Canada W.S. Read Outstanding Service Gold Medal; 2011 - Advance Computing and Communications Society Foundation Award; 2010 - IEEE Canada Outstanding Engineering Educator Award; 2007 - IEEE Canada Reginald Fessendan Medal; 2005 - IEEE VT Soc. Chairman’s Award; 2004 - Thomas W. Eadie Medal; 2004 - IEEE VT Soc. Avant Garde Award; 2002 - IEEE Leon K. Kirchmayer Graduate Teaching Award; 2000 - IEEE Third-Millennium Medal; 1999 - IEEE Haraden Pratt Award; 1996 - Larry K Wilson Transnational Award; 1995 - McNaughton Gold Medal; 1993 - Science Council of BC, Gold Medal in Engg. and Applied Sciences; 1990 - Engineering Institute of Canada, John B. Sterling Medal; 1984 - IEEE Centennial Medal
- Scientific career
- Workplaces: UBC

Vijay K. Bhargava (विजय भार्गव; born September 22, 1948) is a researcher and Professor in the Department of Electrical and Computer Engineering at the University of British Columbia (UBC). He served the department as its Head for 5 years (July 2003-June 2008). Before moving to UBC, Bhargava was a Professor in the Department of Electrical and Computer Engineering at University of Victoria.

Bhargava received his B.Sc. from Queen's University, Kingston, Ontario in 1970. He received his M.Sc. and Ph.D. from the same university in 1972 and 1974 respectively. He has been appointed in regular and visiting positions at the University of Victoria (UVic), Indian Institute of Science, University of Waterloo, Concordia University, Ecole Polytechnique de Montreal, UNIDO, NTT Wireless Comm. Labs, Tokyo Institute of Technology, University of Indonesia, the Hong Kong University of Science and Technology, the University of Hong Kong and City University of Hong Kong.

Bhargava was the founder and president of Binary Communications Inc. from 1983 to 2000. He is a co-author/co-editor of several books including Green Radio Communication Networks (2012), Digital Communications by Satellite: Modulation, Multiple Access, and Coding (1981), Cooperative Cellular Wireless Communications (2011), Reed Solomon Codes and their Applications (1994), Communications, Information and Network Security (2003) and Cognitive Wireless Communication Networks (2007).

Bhargava is Fellow of the IEEE for leadership in the development and applications of error control coding devices and is active in the same. He has served as the President of the Information Theory Society, VP for Regional Activities Board, Director of Region 7, Montreal Section Chair and Victoria Section Chair. He is a past member of the Board of Governors of the IEEE Communications Society (ComSoc) and the IEEE Information Theory Society. He was nominated by the IEEE BoD as a candidate for the office of President-Elect in 1996 and 2002. He was the editor-in-chief of the IEEE Transactions on Wireless Communications from 2007–2009. He also served the IEEE Communications Society as the Director of Journals. Vijay Bhargava is the current President of the IEEE Communications Society.

In September 2008, the "International Workshop on Advances in Communications (VijayFest 2008)" was organized in honour of the distinguished career of Bhargava on the occasion of his sixtieth birthday. In 2009, Vahid Tarokh, professor at Harvard University, dedicated his edited book New Directions in Wireless Communications Research to Bhargava "in deep respect and admiration for his over 30 years of extraordinary leadership and innovation in the field of communications research".

Bhargava has been actively involved in a number of conferences, reviving the IEEE Canadian Conference on Electrical and Computer Engineering, and founding the IEEE Pacific Rim Conference held at the University of Victoria during odd numbered years.

== See also ==
- List of University of Waterloo people
