= James H. Mulligan Jr. =

American electrical engineer and professor

- Born: James Henry Mulligan Jr. October 29, 1920; Jersey City, New Jersey
- Died: January 12, 1996 (aged 75)
- Education: Cooper Union (BEE); Stevens Institute of Technology (MS); Columbia University (PhD)
- Occupations: Electrical engineer Academic administrator
- Title: Secretary (1964–1974) and executive officer (1968–1974) of the National Academy of Engineering; Dean (1974–1978) and professor (1974–1991) of the University of California, Irvine School of Engineering
- Awards: IEEE Haraden Pratt Award (1974)

James H. Mulligan Jr. (October 29, 1920 – January 12, 1996) was an American electrical engineer and professor. He was dean and professor emeritus of electrical and computer engineering of University of California, Irvine and former secretary and executive officer of the National Academy of Engineering.

== Biography ==
Mulligan was born in Jersey City, New Jersey, on October 29, 1920. He received his BEE and EE from Cooper Union and his M.S. in electrical engineering from Stevens Institute of Technology and a PhD in electrical engineering from Columbia University in 1948. He completed his postdoctoral studies at Columbia and New York University.

Mulligan began his career as a technician in the transmission development department at Bell Labs and later joined the United States Naval Research Laboratory, where he contributed to the development of the IFF Mark V system. At the end of World War II, he joined the Allen B. DuMont Laboratories where he was involved in the development of television camera and video equipment. He later served as a professor of electrical engineering at New York University and chairman of its department of electrical engineering from 1952 to 1968.

Mulligan's research concerned the design of electrical circuits and analytical methods that underlie those designs. His work established the foundations of the design of Analogue electronics. For his technical contributions, he was elected a member of the National Academy of Engineering (NAE) in 1974.

In 1968, Mulligan joined the staff of the NAE, becoming its second secretary. He also became the NAE's first executive officer that year. He was the first and only NAE staff member, who at the time of appointment was not a member of the NAE, to be elected a member of the academy. In 1971, he served as president of the Institute of Electrical and Electronics Engineers (IEEE). He was also an elected fellow of the Institution of Electrical Engineers and the American Association for the Advancement of Science.

In 1974, Mulligan left the NAE to become dean of the University of California, Irvine School of Engineering and completed his term in 1978. He then continued as a professor at UC Irvine until his retirement in 1991.

Mulligan received the 1974 IEEE Haraden Pratt Award. He is the namesake of the IEEE's James H. Mulligan, Jr. Education Medal that recognizes educators for their contributions to engineering education.

Mulligan died on January 12, 1996.
