= Canan Dağdeviren =

Turkish scientist (born 1985)

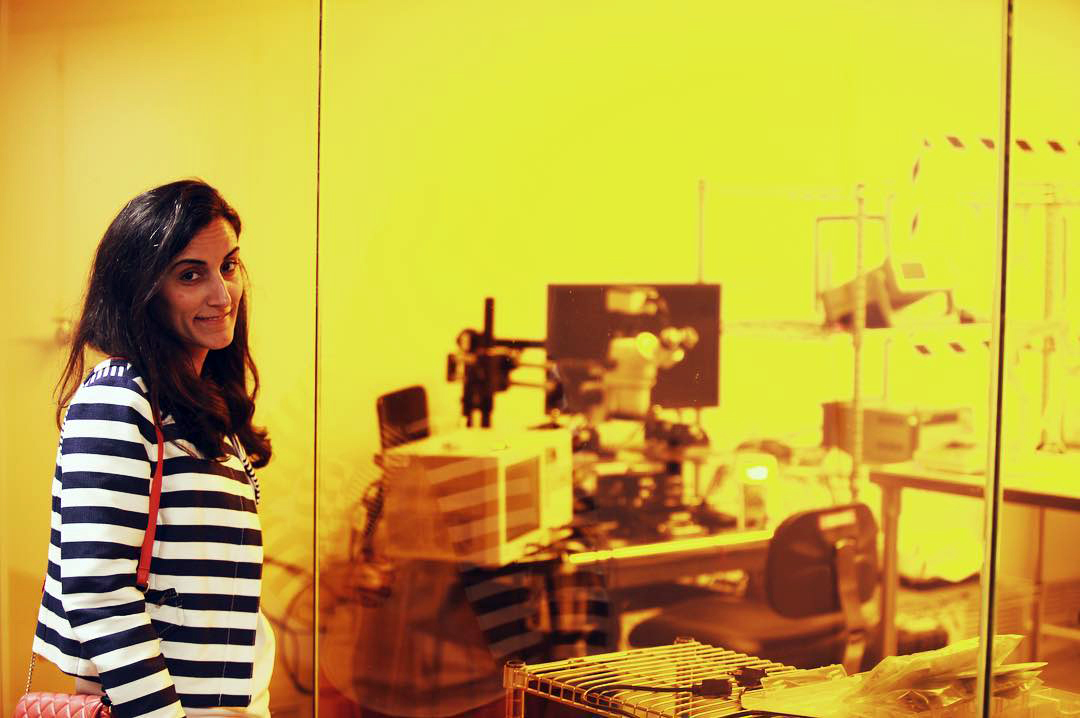
- Born: May 4, 1985 (age 41); Istanbul, Turkey
- Education: Hacettepe University (BS); Sabancı University (MS); University of Illinois at Urbana–Champaign (PhD)
- Known for: Electromechanical systems; microfabrication; conformable electronics; piezoelectric biomedical systems
- Awards: MIT Technology Review Innovators Under 35 (TR35) Inventor Category; Forbes 30 Under 30 Science Category; The Science & SciLifeLab Prize for Young Scientists Translational Medicine Category Winner; NARSAD Young Investigator Award; NSF CAREER Award
- Scientific career
- Fields: Materials science, physics, bioengineering
- Workplaces: MIT; Harvard University
- Doctoral advisor: John A. Rogers
- Other academic advisors: Robert S. Langer (post-doctoral)

Canan Dağdeviren (born May 4, 1985) is a Turkish academic, physicist, material scientist, and associate professor at the Massachusetts Institute of Technology (MIT), where she currently holds the LG Career Development Professorship in Media Arts and Sciences. Dağdeviren is the first Turkish scientist in the history of the Harvard Society to become a Junior Fellow in the Society of Fellows at Harvard University. As a faculty member, she directs her own Conformable Decoders research group at the MIT Media Lab. The group works at the intersection of materials science, engineering and biomedical engineering. They create mechanically adaptive electromechanical systems that can intimately integrate with the target object of interest for sensing, actuation, and energy harvesting, among other applications. Dağdeviren believes that vital information from nature and the human body is "coded" in various forms of physical patterns. Her research focuses on the creation of conformable decoders that can "decode" these patterns into beneficial signals and/or energy.

== Early life ==
Canan Dağdeviren was born in Istanbul, Turkey on May 4, 1985. Her family is originally from Sivas. She is the oldest of three siblings, and has two younger brothers. Canan completed her primary education in İzmit, where she also attended middle school. However, her family was forced to leave the city after the 1999 İzmit earthquake, and she continued her high school education in Adana.

Dağdeviren was drawn to scientific exploration from a very young age. In an interview with Discover Magazine, she recalls being fascinated by smashing rocks together and producing sparks, saying "I loved the idea that you deform this material and create sparks. It was very exciting." Another source of inspiration came from a book that her father gave her on the life of Marie Curie. She quickly became infatuated not just with Curie's work, but also with the research conducted by her husband Pierre Curie, who Dağdeviren considers her "scientific love." Pierre and his brother Jacques first described piezoelectricity in 1880, a concept that would later serve as the driving force behind many of Dağdeviren's own projects and applications.

Finally, at the heart of her work is Dağdeviren's own family. An early source of inspiration was learning about her grandfather, who died of heart failure at age 28. Even as a young girl, she promised herself that someday she would create technology that would decode and monitor similar health issues to honor his memory.

== Education and academic career ==
Canan Dağdeviren studied physics engineering at the Hacettepe University in Ankara, graduating in 2007. She obtained a Master of Science degree from Sabancı University in Istanbul, and won a Fulbright scholarship for study in the United States. With this scholarship, she chose to conduct research in materials science and engineering at the University of Illinois at Urbana Champaign, where she focused on exploring patterning techniques and creating piezoelectric biomedical systems. Here, one of the projects that she developed was a conformable, piezoelectric, energy harvester that converts mechanical energy from internal organ movements into electric energy to power medical devices. It is soft and flexible and conforms to the heart as well as other soft tissues. This technology could extend the battery life of implanted electronics or eliminate the need for battery replacement, sparing patients from repeated operations and the risk of surgical complications. In August 2014, she received her PhD degree. Her advisor was John A. Rogers, and the title of her PhD thesis was "Ferroelectric/piezoelectric flexible mechanical energy harvesters and stretchable epidermal sensors for medical applications".

Dağdeviren then went to Cambridge, Massachusetts, to become a Junior Fellow in the Society of Fellows at Harvard University, the first Turkish scientist in the history of the Harvard Society to do so, as well as a postdoctoral research associate at MIT's Koch Institute for Integrative Cancer Research. Her postdoctoral advisor was MIT Institute Professor Robert S. Langer.

Dağdeviren joined MIT faculty as an assistant professor in 2017. She teaches a course on conformable devices every semester, and also serves as a freshman advisor.

Recently, she was invited to present to the World.Minds community at the annual invitation-only symposium in Zürich, Switzerland. Her most recent research and achievements are summarized in her World.Minds talk.

== Projects and publications ==
=== YellowBox ===
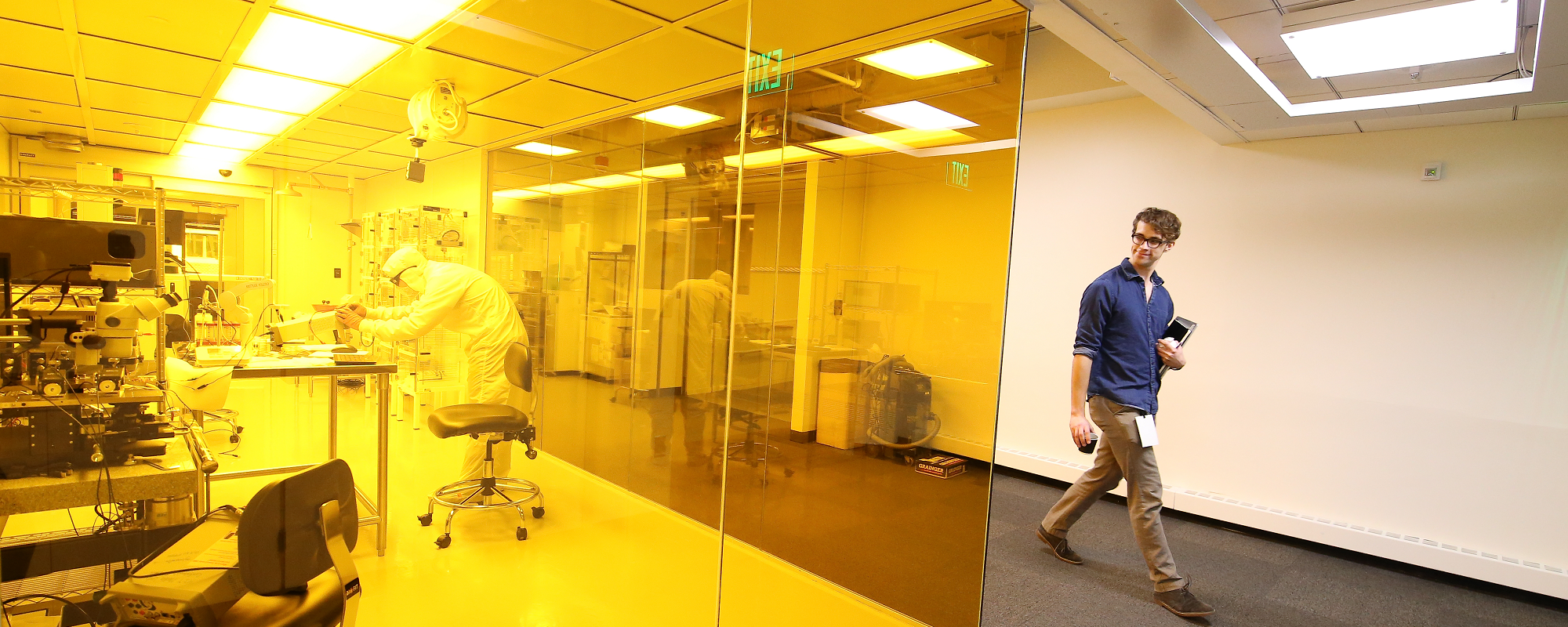
YellowBox

The YellowBox is a cleanroom used by Conformable Decoders at the MIT Media Lab, which Dağdeviren designed and constructed from the ground up in 2017. When she was a PhD student, she promised herself that if she ever had the opportunity to build her own space, it would be physically transparent so that anyone passing by would have the ability to observe, take notes, and learn from her without needing any special permissions. This inclusivity is part of what makes YellowBox such a unique scientific environment. Another unique aspect of YellowBox is that it is organized using 5S Methodology. 5S is a system which uses five guiding practices to organize a work space for efficiency and effectiveness: Sort, Set in Order, Shine, Standardize, and Sustain. Essentially, 5S is an organizational methodology that uses visual labels, color-coded based on functionality, to organize spaces and increase safety, identifying potential hazards and procedural information. As a result of this highly organized and efficient system, YellowBox achieved a Green Labs certification by Environmental Health & Safety (EHS) in 2017, the first research lab at the MIT Media Lab to receive this designation since its founding in 1985. Recently, Dağdeviren published an article featured in Advanced Intelligent Systems describing her group's experience with greater efficiency, as a result of the 5S Methodology principles.

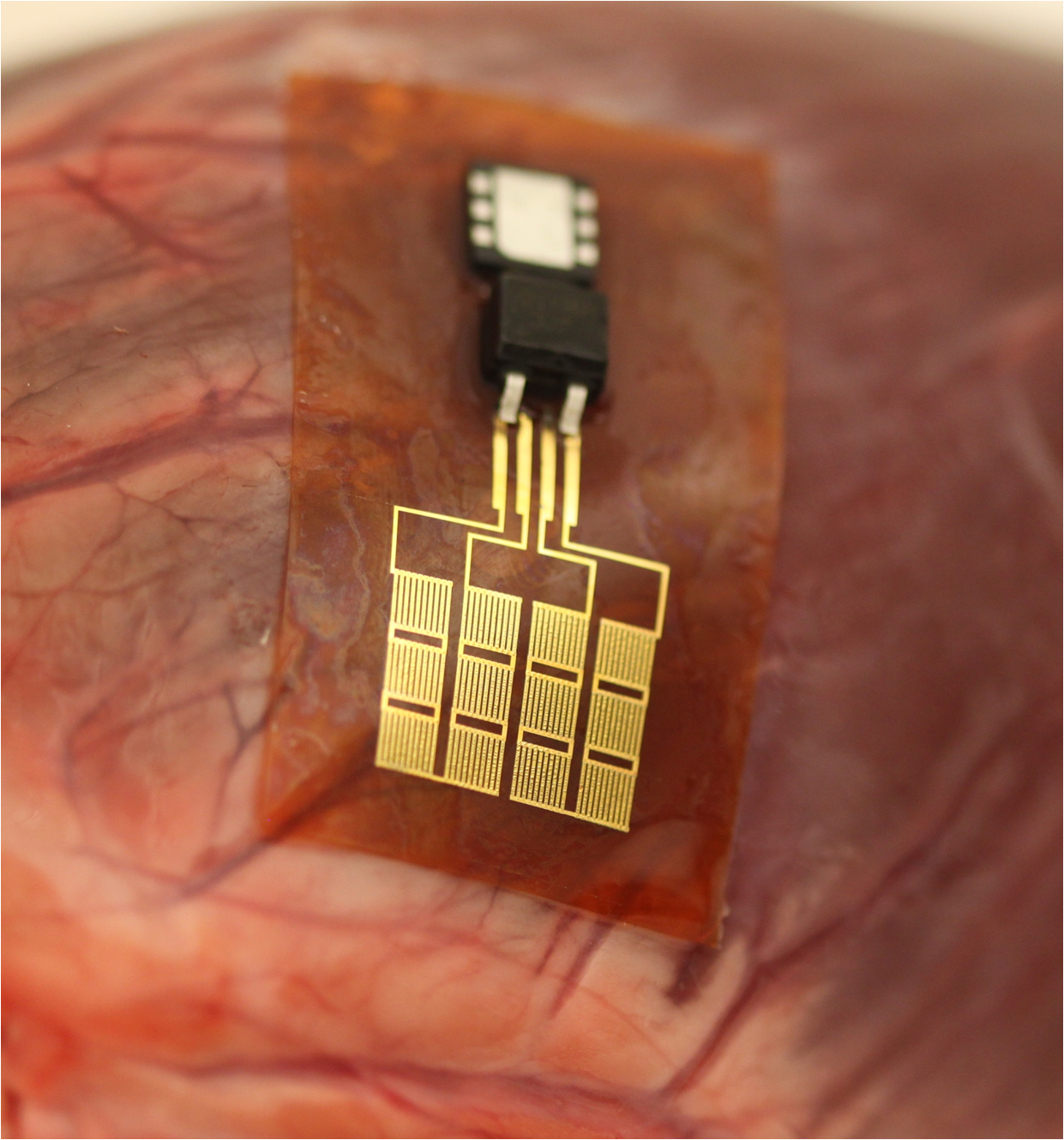
PZT MEH

=== Conformal Piezoelectric Mechanical Energy Harvesters (PZT MEH) ===
In 2014, Dağdeviren and her team developed conformal piezoelectric mechanical energy harvesters, which have been described as "mechanically invisible human dynamos." This project seeks to develop conformal piezoelectric patches integrated into personal garments to extract energy from body movements such as the motion of arms, fingers, and legs. In the future, this work could improve quality life for people and potentially provide environmentally friendly power. Since these energy harvesters are powered by human motion instead of battery power, the need for replacements and high risk/high cost surgical procedures to change depleted batteries could be eliminated.

=== Flexible Piezoelectric Devices for Gastrointestinal Motility Sensing (PZT GI-S) ===
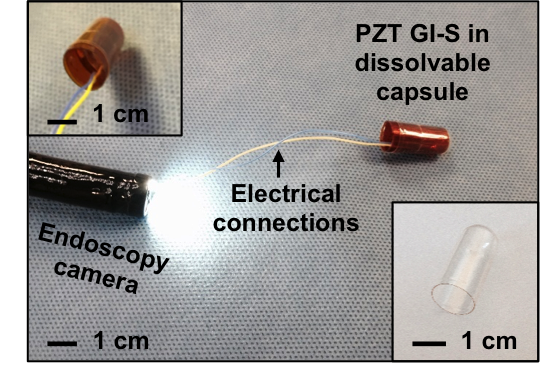
PZT GI-S

In 2017, the PZT GI-S project (essentially "a Fitbit for the stomach.") was published. Dağdeviren and fellow collaborators designed an ingestible, flexible piezoelectric device that senses mechanical deformation within the gastric cavity. They demonstrated the capabilities of the sensor in both in vitro and ex vivo simulated gastric models, quantified its key behaviors in the gastrointestinal tract using computational modelling, and validated its functionality in awake and ambulating swine. The proof-of-concept device may lead to the development of ingestible piezoelectric devices that might safely sense mechanical variations and harvest mechanical energy inside the gastrointestinal tract for the diagnosis and treatment of motility disorders, as well as for monitoring ingestion in bariatric applications.

=== Miniaturized Neural System For Chronic, Local Intracerebral Drug Delivery (MiNDS) ===
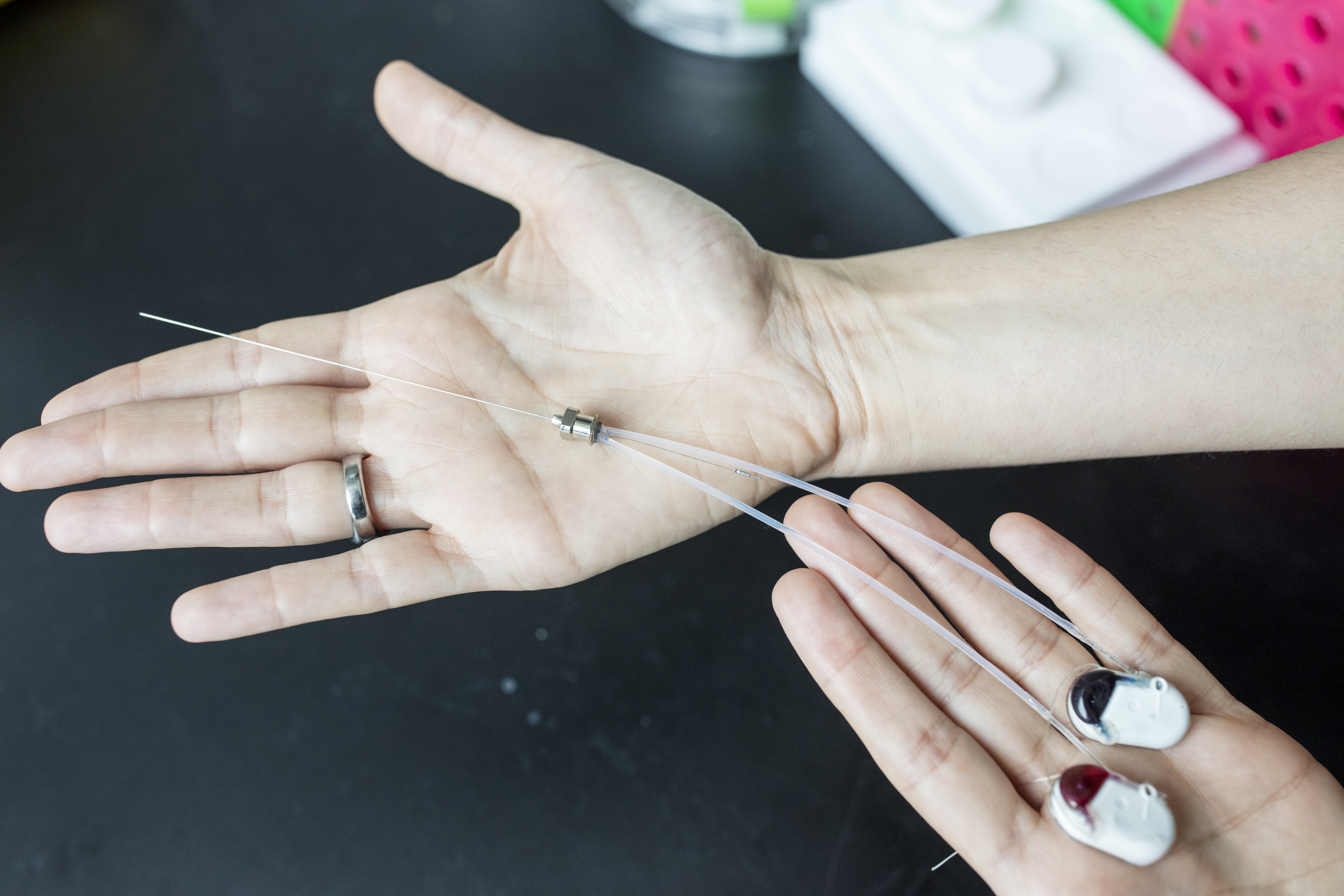
MiNDS

In 2018, Dağdeviren and her team developed an implantable, remotely controllable, miniaturized neural drug delivery system permitting dynamic adjustment of therapy with pinpoint spatial accuracy. Recent advances in medications for neurodegenerative disorders are expanding opportunities for improving the debilitating symptoms suffered by patients. Existing pharmacologic treatments, however, often rely on systemic drug administration, which result in broad drug distribution and consequent increased risk for toxicity. Given that many key neural circuitries have sub–cubic millimeter volumes and cell-specific characteristics, small-volume drug administration into affected brain areas with minimal diffusion and leakage is essential. Dağdeviren and her team demonstrates that this device can chemically modulate local neuronal activity in small-animal (rodent) and large-animal (nonhuman primate) models, while simultaneously allowing the recording of neural activity to enable feedback control.

=== Electronic Textile Conformable Suit (E-TeCS) ===
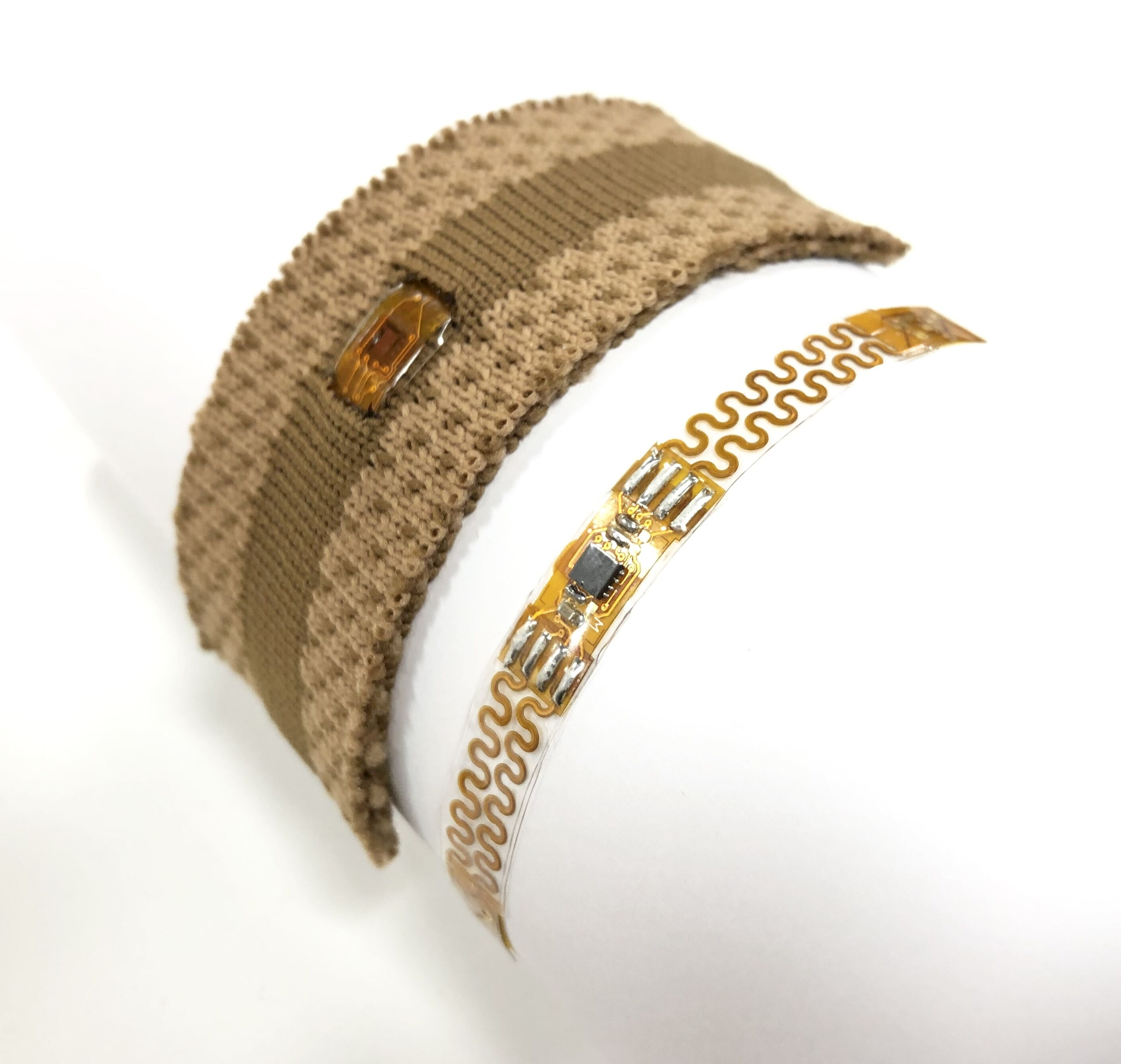
E-TeCS

In 2020, Dağdeviren and her team created a tailored, electronic textile conformable suit (E-TeCS) to perform large-scale, multi-modal physiological (temperature, heart rate, and respiration) sensing in vivo. The rapid advancement of electronic devices and fabrication technologies has further promoted the field of wearables and smart textiles. However, most of the current efforts in textile electronics focus on a single modality and cover a small area. E-TeCS introduces a new platform of modular, conformable (i.e., flexible and stretchable) distributed sensor networks that can be embedded into digitally-knit textiles. This platform can be customized for various forms, sizes and functions using standard, accessible and high-throughput textile manufacturing and garment patterning techniques.

=== Conformable Facial Code Extrapolation Sensor (cFaCES) ===
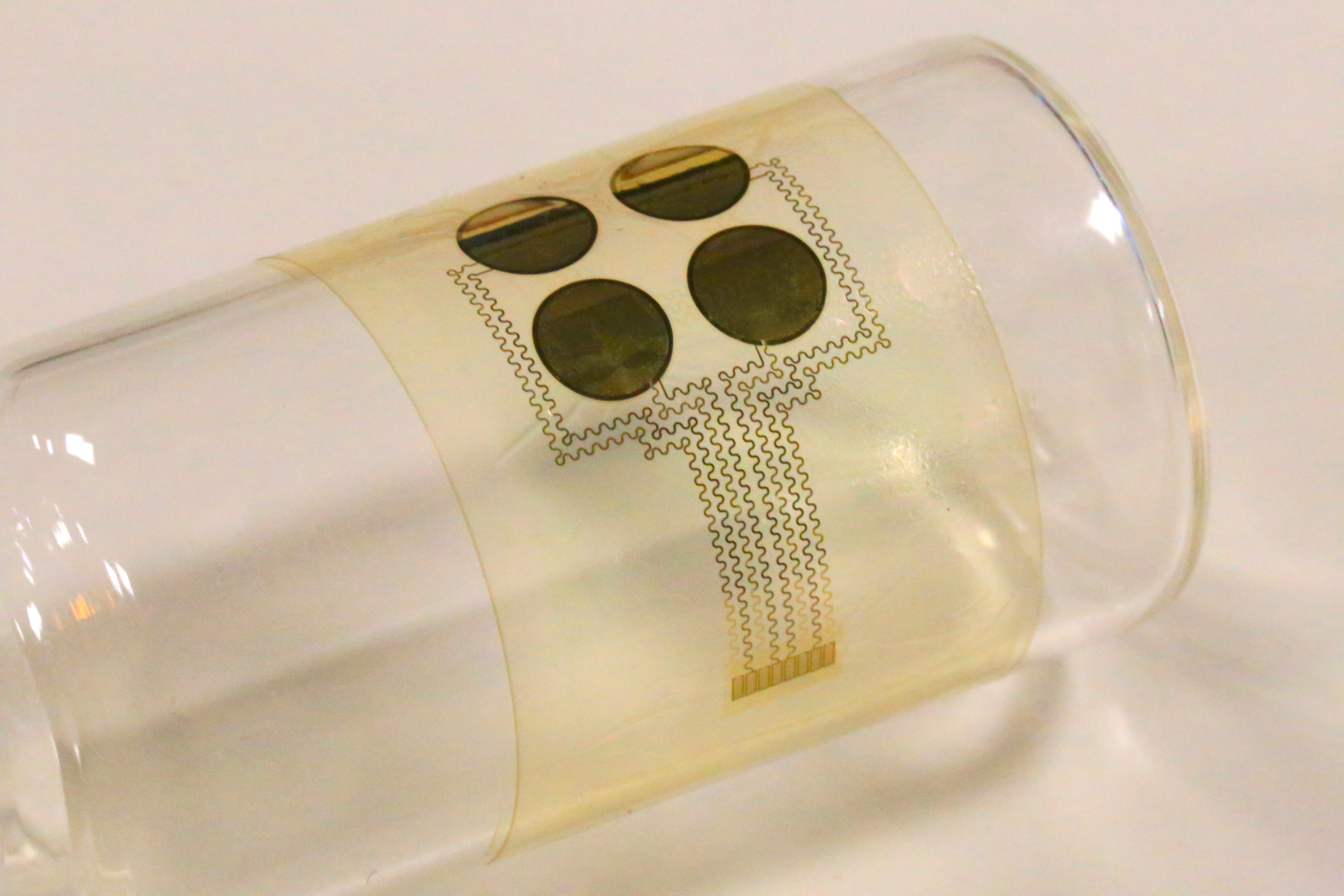
cFaCES

In 2020, Dağdeviren announced the design and pilot testing of an integrated system for decoding facial strains and for predicting facial kinematics, called cFaCES. The system consists of mass-manufacturable, conformable piezoelectric thin films for strain mapping; multiphysics modelling for analysing the nonlinear mechanical interactions between the conformable device and the epidermis; and three-dimensional digital image correlation for reconstructing soft-tissue surfaces under dynamic deformations as well as for informing device design and placement. In healthy individuals and in patients with amyotrophic lateral sclerosis (ALS), it is shown that the piezoelectric thin films, coupled with algorithms for the real-time detection and classification of distinct skin-deformation signatures, enable the reliable decoding of facial movements.

=== Conformable Sensory Facemask (cMaSK) ===
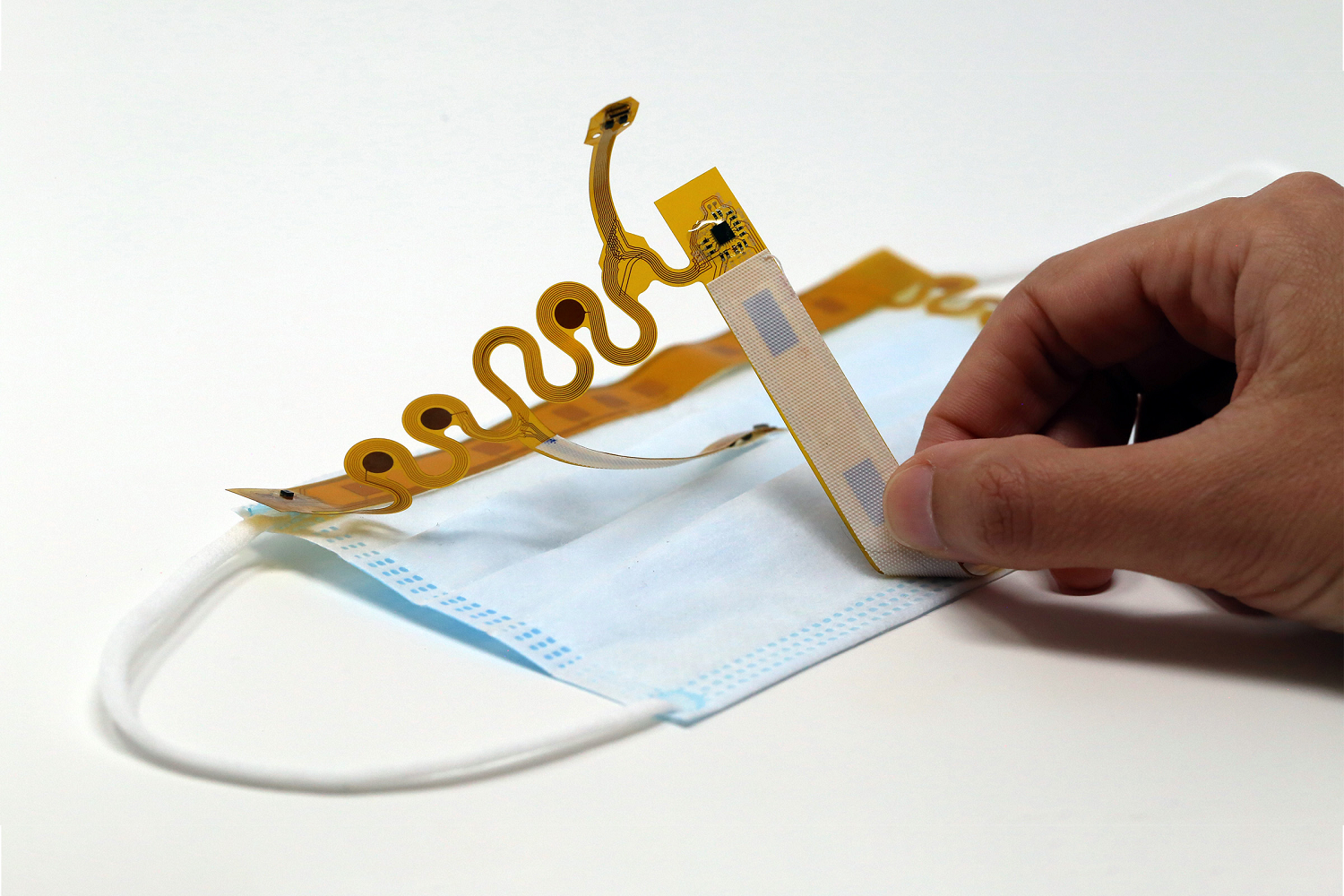
cMaSK (conformable multimodal sensor face mask)

In direct response to the pandemic, Dağdeviren's team developed an innovative conformable multimodal sensory face mask (cMaSK) that can be integrated with commercial face masks to monitor signals related to infectious diseases, environmental conditions, and wear status. The thin and conformable geometry of the cMaSK sensing system allows it to be applied to various types of face masks without concerns of deterioration in performance, as shown by mask-fit tests. The cMaSK can monitor critical biological signals such as breathing rates, coughing, skin temperature and mask fit with high accuracy by analyzing signals from air pressure, humidity and temperature. The cMaSK provides a platform for the development of smart face-mask systems that can provide real-time feedback and can actively assist users in optimizing the face mask fit. Dağdeviren's work offers a modular, customizable research tool for studying environmental and health technologies in real-world conditions where human behavior may affect performance, thereby deepening our understanding of mask-wearing behaviors and the resulting human health implications. This research, published on the front page of Nature Electronics in 2022, was conceived, executed and published within a span of one-year, demonstrating Canan's ability to respond and lead a project to completion in a highly competitive manner to critical, time-sensitive research topics.

=== Conformable Ultrasound Patch (cUSP) ===
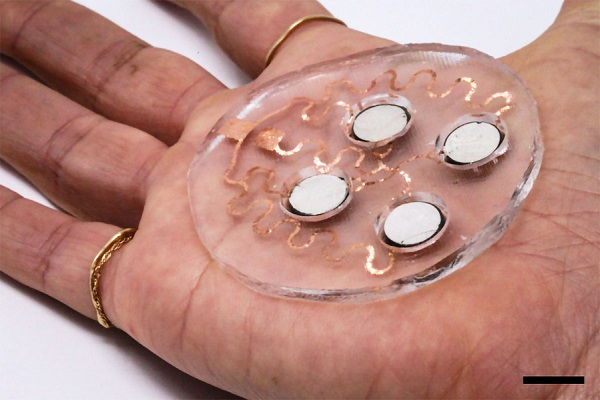
cUSP (conformable ultrasound patch)

Ultrasound-induced transdermal drug delivery (sonophoresis) has long lingered in the by-lanes of academic and industrial research, and has failed to attain tangible commercial success. While localized, needleless delivery of drugs is an exciting prospect, the bulky, power-consumptive equipment and long exposure times do not justify the highly-variable, operator-dependent outcomes in the permeability enhancement effects observed in vivo. In 2023, Dağdeviren's team reported a conformable patch (cUSP) with embedded bulk piezoelectric elements to provide short-exposure (10 minutes) ultrasound and effect a 26.2-fold enhancement in niacinamide transport to the dermis. The final system is packaged in a compact form-factor on a flexible polymer substrate that can be applied on facial skin to aid hands-free penetration of popular cosmeceuticals. The ease-of-use and high-repeatability offered by the proposed system provides a game-changing alternative to patients and consumers suffering from skin conditions and premature skin aging. Dağdeviren's latest invention, cUSP, has made the front cover page of Advanced Materials' June issue and was also appeared in Rising Stars series. The Rising Stars series intends to celebrate the diversity of the international scientific communities that these journals serve by collecting Research Articles on studies conceptualized and supervised by recognized early career researchers from around the world.

=== Conformable Ultrasound Breast Patch (cUSBr-Patch) for Deep Tissue Scanning and Imaging ===
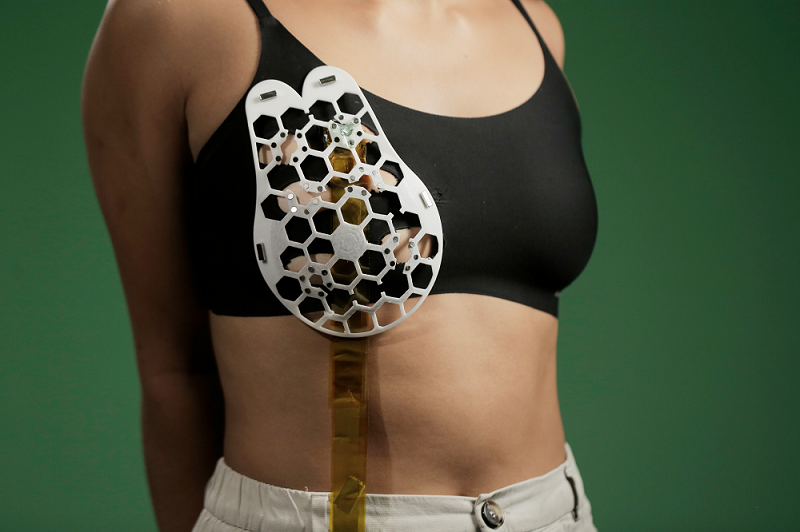
Conformable Ultrasound Breast Patch (cUSBr-Patch)

Most recently, Dağdeviren has created projects in wearable ultrasound technologies, both for sensing and actuation published in Science Advances. Ultrasound modalities have enjoyed a long-standing tradition of being radiation-free, safe and effective on human tissue, but the design, form-factor and cost of ultrasound technologies has not changed from its original hand-held 'wand-like' embodiment of the 1970s. In particular, it is not feasible for current US transducers to perform accurate image reconstruction over large, curved areas. The human breast presents a particular challenge, as its geometry and deformability are highly variable not only between subjects but also at different times and ages within a given subject. Canan has developed a wearable ultrasound technology for longitudinal imaging of breast tissues or lesions both for cancer diagnostic and early detection purposes and to serve as a new non-invasive window into the biological behavior of a breast tumor. With support from the NSF CAREER and 3M Non-Tenured Faculty awards that she received for this work, her goal is to make substantial scientific and leadership contributions to the emerging field of widely deployed biosensing tools. Dağdeviren's latest research is composed of a soft, wearable ultrasound breast patch for early detection of breast cancer. The device enables standardized and reproducible image acquisition over the entire breast with less reliance on operator training and applied transducer compression. A nature-inspired honeycomb-shaped patch combined with a one-dimensional (1D) phased array transducer is guided by a tracker that provides for large-area, deep tissue scanning and multi-angle breast imaging capability. The results from the device have been cross validated with a commercial ultrasound probe and published in Nature Electronics. The device has the potential to introduce interfaces that enable next-generation features of wearable technologies, such as accurate, autonomous monitoring of soft tissue for 3D imaging, and machine-learning strategies to detect breast tumor progression outside of a clinical setting.

The preliminary results from her research on the breast patch have already garnered valuable traction both within and outside of the academic community. In 2021, Canan was selected for the MIT Future Founders Prize Competition, which is designed to support the top female faculty entrepreneurs at MIT. Dağdeviren became a runner up and received $100K for her invention.

== Exhibitions ==
=== The Bees of Science ===
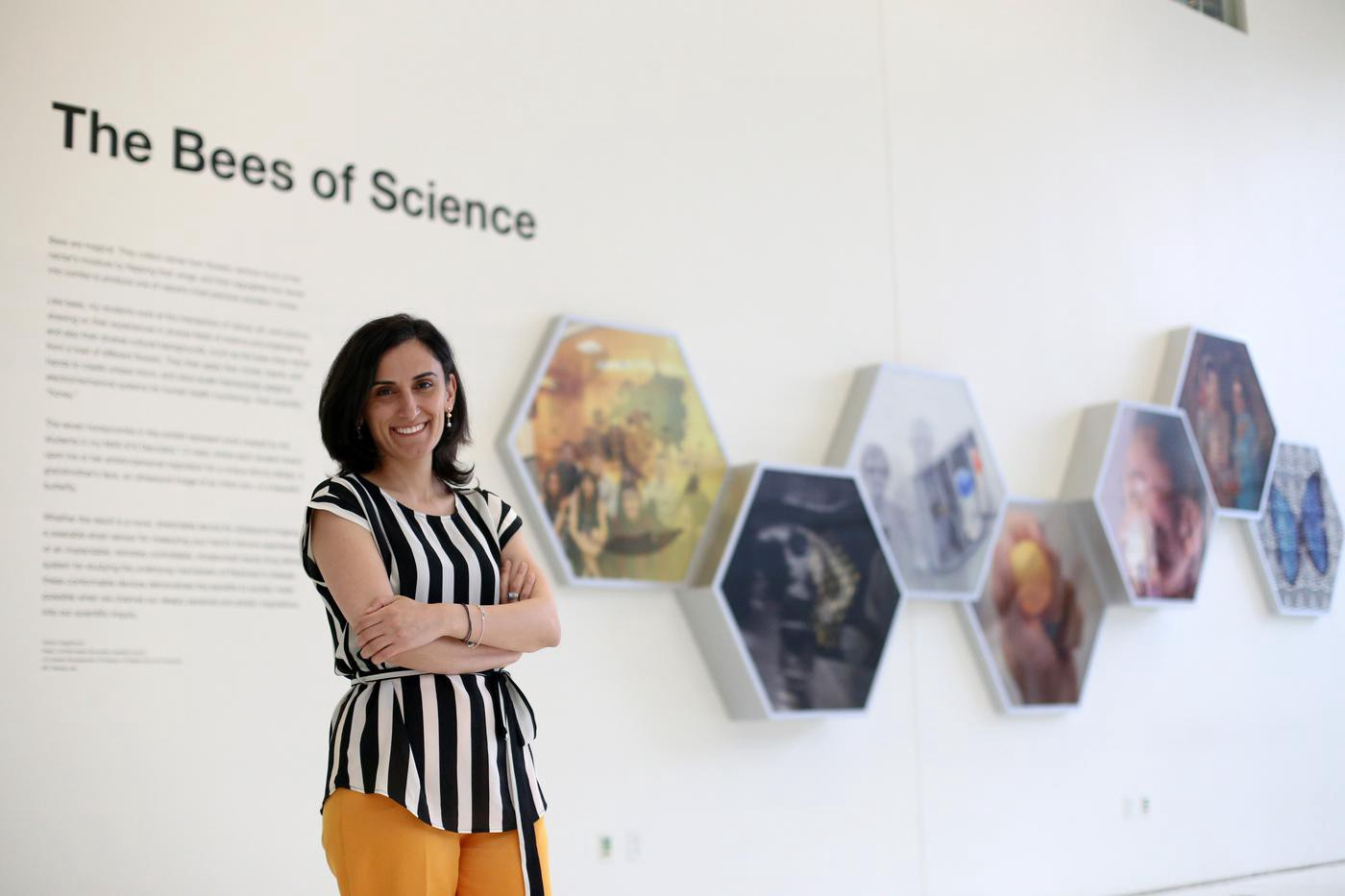
The Bees of Science

In June 2019, Dağdeviren blended media, art, and science to create an exhibition which was featured in the lobby of the Media Lab for 8 months. The exhibition displayed her students' work, and was titled The Bees of Science. In a blog post, she explained "Like bees, my students work at the intersection of nature, art, and science, drawing on both their experiences in diverse fields of science and engineering and also their diverse cultural backgrounds, much as the bees draw nectar from a host of different flowers. They then apply their minds, hearts, and hands to create unique micro- and nano-scale, mechanically adaptive electromechanical systems for human health monitoring, their scientific "honey."

== Awards and honors ==
In 2014, Dağdeviren became the first Turkish scientist to be elected as a Junior Fellow of Harvard.

In 2015, MIT Technology Review named her among the "Top 35 Innovators Under 35" (inventor category), and Forbes magazine selected her as one of the "Top 30 Under 30" in science." The following year she received many honors, including being named a Gifted Citizen by Ciudad de las Ideas of Puebla, Mexico, and the Spotlight Health Scholar by Aspen Institute. She placed first in the Medical Innovation Category of Ten Outstanding Young Persons of the World (TOYP) by Junior Chamber International (JCI), and received the 2017 Innovation and Technology Delegate of the American Academy of Achievement Award. Dağdeviren was also awarded the Science and Sci Life Prize for Young Scientists in Translational Medicine Category by Science/AAAS and SciLifeLab, and attended the Nobel Prize Ceremony in Stockholm, Sweden.

Since beginning her current position at the MIT Media Lab, Dağdeviren and her students published a paper "Towards personalized medicine: the evolution of imperceptible healthcare technologies," published in the November 2018 issue of Foresight, a journal of future studies, strategic thinking, and policy. The paper was selected by the journal's editorial board as an Outstanding Paper for the 2019 Emerald Literati Awards.

In 2019, Dağdeviren was awarded the Kadir Has University Promising Scientist Award, and recognized in Fortune Turkey's "40 Under 40." She was also named as one of the United States's "87 brightest young engineers" by the National Academy of Engineering (NAE), and took part in the NAE's 25th annual US Frontiers of Engineering (USFOE) Symposium.

In April 2021, Dağdeviren was honored with two awards: the 2021 National Science Foundation's Faculty Early Career Development Program (CAREER) award, and the 3M Non-Tenured Faculty award. The CAREER award will support Dağdeviren's research on conformable piezoelectrics for soft tissue imaging. The 3M award recognizes outstanding new faculty who were nominated by 3M researchers and selected based on their research, experience and academic leadership. Dağdeviren noted that the combination of these two awards is significant, because they will allow her to "make substantial scientific and leadership contributions to the emerging field of widely deployed biosensing tools, and to achieve a broader understanding of soft tissue in a collective and systemic way for improved human health."

In November 2023, Dağdeviren was named to the BBC's 100 Women list.

== Media ==
Dağdeviren's work has been featured in many media outlets, including The Washington Post, IEEE Spectrum, Forbes, Discover Magazine, MedGadget, Stat News, Nature Materials, AP News.

=== UN talk ===
In addition to her work in the materials science and engineering fields, Dağdeviren seeks to inspire an upcoming generation of young scientists, specifically young women pursuing STEM careers. She uses social media as a tool to connect with young minds across the globe, specifically through her Twitter, Instagram and Facebook accounts.

In February 2018, she was invited to speak at the Women in Science in Diplomacy for Sustaining Peace and Development event as part of the celebration of International Day of Women and Girls in Science at the United Nations.

Since 2015, she has participated in numerous Women in Science and Engineering (WISE) panels across the globe and in various outreach activities that target women.

=== Blog ===
Dağdeviren enjoys sharing her personal take on leading a research group, teaching, and working in the YellowBox through perspective posts on her blog.

== Personal ==
In an interview, Dağdeviren said that she was inspired for science by two books; a book on the life of the twice Nobel Prize-winning Polish-French physicist and chemist Marie Curie (1867–1934) and Turkish theoretical physicist Erdal İnönü's (1926–2007) book of his memories (Turkish: Anılar ve Düşünceler). She also finds great inspiration in Rumi, a 13th-century Persian poet who practiced Sufism, a movement to understand the universe under the lenses of sensation, beauty and love as well as care about integrity, dignity and sincerity.
