= Moshe Kam =

American engineering educator (born 1955)

- משה קם
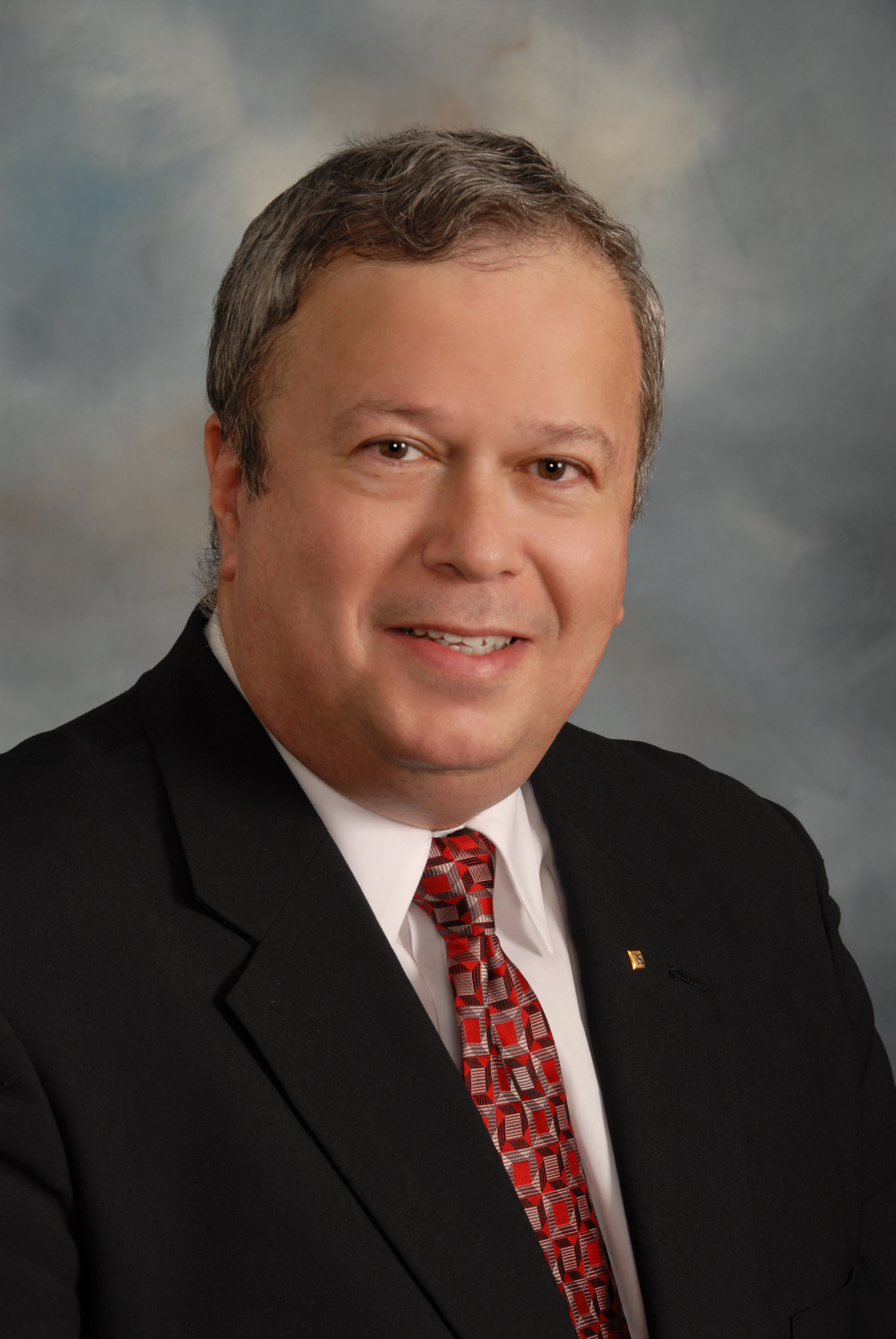
- Kam in 2008
- Born: October 3, 1955 (age 70); Tel Aviv, Israel
- Education: Tel Aviv University (BS); Drexel University (MS, PhD)
- Awards: Presidential Young Investigator Award, US National Science Foundation, 1990; C. Holmes MacDonald Outstanding Teaching Award, Eta Kappa Nu, 1991; IEEE Third Millennium Award, 2000; Fellow of the IEEE, 2001; Honorary Professor, South China University of Technology, 2006, IEEE Haraden Pratt Award, 2016
- Scientific career
- Fields: Electrical engineer; Detection and Estimation; Data fusion; Engineering Education
- Workplaces: New Jersey Institute of Technology; Drexel University
- Thesis: Entropy And The Basic Percepts of System Theory (1987)
- Doctoral advisor: Paul Kalata
- Doctoral students: Lex Fridman

Dr Moshe Kam (Hebrew: משה קם; born October 3, 1955) is an Israeli and American electrical engineer. He is an engineering educator currently serving as Distinguished Professor and Interim Provost at New Jersey Institute of Technology (NJIT), where he previously served as Dean of the Newark College of Engineering (2014-2026). Until August 2014 he served as the Robert G. Quinn Professor and department head of electrical and computer engineering at Drexel University. In 2011, he served concurrently as the 49th president and CEO of IEEE. Earlier he was IEEE's vice president for educational activities (2005–2007) and IEEE's representative director to the accreditation body ABET. Kam is known for his studies of decision fusion and distributed detection, which focus on computationally feasible fusion rules for multi-sensor systems.

== Biography ==
Kam was born in 1955 to Polish-Jewish parents and grew up in Tel Aviv, Israel. He received a Bachelor of Science degree in electrical and electronics engineering in 1976 from Tel Aviv University. Between 1976 and 1983 he served in the Israel Defense Forces. In 1983 he moved to Philadelphia, Pennsylvania, U.S. He received a Master of Science degree in electrical engineering in 1985 and a PhD in 1987, both from Drexel University. In 2001, Kam was elevated to IEEE fellow for contributions to the theory of decision fusion and distributed detection.

Kam worked as professor of electrical and computer engineering at Drexel University between 1986 and 2014. In September 2014 he joined the New Jersey Institute of Technology as professor and dean of the Newark College of Engineering. His research interests include detection and estimation, decision fusion and distributed detection, robot navigation and data mining. He has authored over 150 journal and conference papers in these areas. He is an active IEEE volunteer, having served as chair of the IEEE Philadelphia Section, chair of the IEEE Region 2 Committee, member of the IEEE board of directors, chair of the IEEE audit committee, vice president for educational activities, and 2011 president and CEO.

== Activities in pre-university education and academic accreditation ==
In late 2004 Kam was elected IEEE vice president for educational activities, having served earlier as director of IEEE Region 2 (Eastern USA). He served as vice president for three years, during which IEEE expanded greatly its activities in pre-university engineering education and in accreditation of academic programs. The major pre-university programs established during his tenure were the engineering education portal TryEngineering.org (a joint project of IEEE, IBM and the New York Hall of Science); and internationalization of the IEEE Teacher In-Service Program. TryEngineering.org is a portal for pre-university students, their parents, teachers and school counselors, which provides information about all branches of engineering, technology and computing, and all available accredited programs for undergraduate and graduate study in these disciplines. The Teacher In-Service Program (TISP) trains IEEE volunteers to work with pre-university teachers in order to integrate engineering and engineering design into the pre-university curriculum. Since 2003 TISP has expanded from being exclusively a US-based program to Argentina, Brazil, Canada, China, Malaysia, Peru, Portugal, Trinidad and Tobago, Uruguay, and South Africa.

In the area of academic accreditation, he established an accreditation evaluator training program for the Peruvian accreditation body ICACIT, and assisted in the creation of an accrediting body for engineering and technology in the Caribbean, CACET. He has also developed ties between IEEE and the China Association for Science and Technology, and created the informational portal on accreditation of academic programs in engineering, technology, and computing, Accreditation.org.

For his activities in the areas of pre-university and university education, Kam received in 2016 the IEEE Haraden Pratt Award.

== Election to the presidency of IEEE ==
Kam was candidate for the office IEEE President-Elect In 2008 but lost to Pedro Ray. In 2009 he was elected to that position (the other candidates in the 2009 elections were Joseph Lillie and J. Roberto Boisson de Marca). He served as president and CEO of IEEE in 2011. His election platform emphasized the expansion of IEEE to new technical areas (especially the intersection between electrical engineering, computer engineering, computer science and the life sciences); providing services to practicing engineers.

In June 2020 Kam and 2010 IEEE past president Pedro Ray led an open letter to the Membership of IEEE in the aftermath of the murder of George Floyd in Minneapolis, Minnesota, US.

== Initiatives at the New Jersey Institute of Technology ==
Kam initiated the effort to create a large industrial-grade makerspace at NJIT. The New Jersey legislature supported the initiative. The first stage of the Makerspace (9,500 square feet) was opened in early 2018. It is the largest facility of its kind in New Jersey. Among other functions, the makerspace offers equipment and devices for 3D printing, additive manufacturing, material cutting and shaping, metrology, visualization, computing, emulation, and simulation. During the COVID-19 pandemic, the NJIT Makerspace was converted to a production facility, manufacturing reusable and washable face shields for medical personnel and first responders.

Kam developed the plans for NJIT's School of Applied Engineering and Technology, which was inaugurated in 2018.

As part of the 2019 celebrations of the Centennial of the Newark College of Engineering (NCE, established 1919), Kam initiated the "NCE 100" Hall of Fame, whose inductees include, among others, Pierre Ramond, Ellen M. Pawlikowski and Gerard J. Foschini.

== Most cited technical papers ==
- 1997, "Sensor Fusion for Mobile Robot Navigation" (1997, Proceedings of the IEEE), with Xiaoxun Zhu and Paul Kalata.
- 1997, "Decision Fusion and Supervisor Synthesis in Decentralized Discrete-Event Systems," (1997, American Control Conference), with J. Prosser and H. Kwatny.
- 2002, "Neural Network Architectures for Control" (2002, IEEE Control Systems Magazine), with Allon Guez and James Eilbert.

== Essays on the state of the profession ==
- 2005, "Why won’t Jane go to Engineering School" (2005, The institute, IEEE)
- 2006, "Will ABET Survive to the Year 2032?" (2006, The Interface, IEEE & ASEE)
- 2007, "What Should Be the First Professional Degree in Engineering?" (2005, The institute, IEEE), with A. Peskin.
