= NIH Record =

Catalogue of healthcare record

The NIH Record is a publication of the United States government for employees of the National Institutes of Health. Founded in 1949 (as 'N.I.H. record'), it was published 25 times every year and circulated to 20,000 readers. The final issue was published on January 30, 2026.
