= Disabled Veterans National Foundation =

American nonprofit organization

- Founded: 2007
- Type: registered charity
- Headquarters: Lanham, Maryland
- Website: www.dvnf.org

The Disabled Veterans National Foundation (DVNF) is an American registered charity that provides service for disabled veterans. Founded in 2007, the organization is based in Lanham, Maryland.

== History ==
DVNF was founded in the fall of 2007 by six women veterans and State Women Veterans Coordinators to expand their scope of work within the veterans' community.

The foundation aims to serves the needs of veterans, including homeless veterans, women veterans, and veterans who experience posttraumatic stress disorder, brain injuries and invisible disabilities. According to their website, the group aims to "change the lives of men and women who came home wounded or sick after defending our safety and our freedom."

== Disbursement of funds ==
The Disabled Veterans National Foundation has provided $1 million in aid for nearly 23,000 veterans in six states. The foundation sent goods to centers in California, Houston, Knoxville, and Kansas City including spring water, men's shirts, bananas, paper towels and work gloves. The organization has worked to lobby congress to pass a bill helping homeless veterans gain access to housing and homeless assistance programs.

CharityWatch announced in 2010 that less than one percent of money collected by the charity went to veterans groups. subsequently the organization has received an F rating for is transparency and performance.

A 2012 CNN investigation that aired on Anderson Cooper 360° alleged that after reviewing DVNF's annual tax returns the organization spent more than one dollar on fund raising expenses for each dollar raised. The investigative report further highlighted that the few material products or goods given to veterans groups were items such as football pants, chef jackets and thousands of Coconuts M&M's.

According to the Disabled Veterans National Foundation, in March 2010, the board of directors commissioned Professor Richard Harold Steinberg to do an analysis to determine whether their approach was working, after an initial investigation by CNN. DVNF says that Steinberg found no cause of concern regarding misrepresentation to potential donors.

In May 2012, Senator Max Baucus, chair of the Senate Finance Committee and Senator Richard Burr of the Committee on Veterans' Affairs stated they are investigating DVNF following the CNN report. The open letter to DVNF contained 14 questions about their tax-exempt status and fundraising activities.

As of 2019, the Disabled Veterans National Foundation has not responded to written Better Business Bureau requests for accountability information beyond that typically included in financial statements and government filings, in order to demonstrate transparency and strengthen public trust in the charitable sector. According to the charity watchdog group, the American Institute of Philanthropy, the Disabled Veterans National Foundation is, "contractually obligated to allow another fundraising company it hired, Brickmill Marketing Services to keep 100% of what it raises from donors until the charity's debts to this company Brickmill Marketing Services are paid off." The institute found that the Disabled Veterans National Foundation has obscene fundraising costs, needing up to 98 cents to raise every dollar.

=== Settlement with New York Attorney General ===
New York State Attorney General Eric Schneiderman signed a settlement with DVNF and its professional fundraising consultants on June 30, 2014. The settlement included fines that the state attorney general called the "largest amount of financial relief ever obtained for deceptive charitable fundraising," and was widely covered in the news media. One consulting firm, Quadriga Art LLC, paid $9.7 million in damages, and another, Convergence Direct Marketing, paid $300,000. Quadriga also agreed to pay restitution to DVNF in the form of nearly $13.8 million in debt forgiveness. For its part, DVNF agreed to replace most of its fundraising consultants, to recruit new board members, and to prevent misrepresentations in future fundraising solicitations.

== Board members ==
In April 2010, Precilla Wilkewitz, a Vietnam War veteran who served from 1966 to 1969, was named president of the veterans group. She replaced DVNF co-founder Delilah Washburn who died in April 2010. Wilkewitz is also the State Quarter Master Adjutant for the Louisiana Veterans of Foreign Wars. In 2005, Wilkewitz was reappointed by Louisiana Governor Kathleen B. Blanco to serve on the Louisiana Veterans Affairs Commission for a six-year term, ending in 2011. Under the direction of Louisiana Governor Bobby Jindal, she helped them orchestrate the first Annual Women Veterans Forum to educate women veterans about VA entitlements. Since then its main office in Lanham is primarily ran by an immigrant family who diverts funds set aside for good veteran supplies and use the money for trips to beaches in name of Veterans.

In December 2012, DVNF announced the addition of Steve Weyher and Mike McNaughton to its board of directors. Steve Weyher is a Vietnam veteran of the U.S. Army who served until 1971. Mike McNaughton, also a veteran of the U.S. Army, and served in the military until 2004.
