= Medgadget =

- Website type: Medical technology news
- Available in: English, Spanish
- Headquarters: Eugene, Oregon, United States
- Website: medgadget.com
- Commercial: Yes
- Registration: Optional
- Launched: 2004
- Current status: Offline

Medgadget was a weblog about medical technologies. The website was founded in 2004 and was known for its up-to-date coverage of the international medical technology news, health care trends, and medical research. Medgadget was launched in December 2004.

Medgadget ranked as one of the world's most trafficked and linked to medical blogs in the world. Fox News noted Medgadget as one of the 10 best health blogs in 2010, and the site has been described by Silicon Valley Business Journal as "a popular Web site that focuses on emerging medical devices and technologies".
