= List of Zhejiang University alumni =

This is a list of notable graduates as well as non-graduate former students, academic staff, and university officials of Zhejiang University and its predecessors in China. It also includes those who may be considered alumni by extension, having studied at institutions that later merged with Zhejiang University.

== Politics & government ==
Name	Known as	Known for	Links to Zhejiang University
Chen Duxiu	political leader, writer	Published La Jeunesse which led to the New Culture Movement; Founded the Chinese Communist Party and served as its leader	Studied shipbuilding and French at Qiushi Academy during 1897-1899 until he was expelled due to anti-government speech.
Jiang Baili	military writer, strategist, trainer	Served as the acting principal of the Whampoa Military Academy; Wrote Treatise on National Defence	Studied at Qiushi Academy during 1899–1901
Chen Yi	military leader, politician	Led the 19th Route Army to fight against Japan in January 28 incident; Served as the Governor of Taiwan Province from 1947-to 1949, during which the February 28 incident occurred	Studied at Qiushi Academy
Huang Fu	politician	Led and participated in the 1924 Beijing Coup; Served as the Acting President of the Republic of China	Studied at Qiushi Academy
Jiang Menglin	educator, politician	Served as president of National Peking University and National Chekiang University; Served as the Minister of Education of the Republic of China; Chaired the Sino-American Joint Commission on Rural Reconstruction in Taiwan	Studied at Chekiang Higher Institutes from 1903 to 1904 Served as the first president of National Chekiang University from 1927 to 1928
Wu Han	historian	One of the most important historians in the development of modern historical scholarship in China during the 1930s and 1940s	Studied college preparatory courses at Hangchow College from 1927 to 1928
Hu Qiaomu	politician, Marxist theorist	1st president of the Chinese Academy of Social Sciences; president of Xinhua News Agency; Secretary of Mao Zedong	Studied at the Department of Foreign Languages, National Chekiang University from 1933 to 1935, before he was expelled from the university
Xu Liangying	physicist, historian, human rights defender	Writer of an open letter to Chinese leaders to call for a re-assessment of 1989 protests, signed by 45 Chinese scholars; Recipient of Andrei Sakharov Prize in 2008	BSc Physics at National Chekiang University, Class of 1942
Zhou Rongxin	politician	Secretary-General of the State Council (1965–1975)	President of Zhejiang University (1958–1962)
Huang Zhiquan	politician	former Governor of Jiangxi Province	BSc Agricultural Mechanical Engineering at Zhejiang University, 1959–1963
Zhang Mengjin	politician	vice-chairman of the Zhejiang People's Congress	Studied at Hangzhou University
Lu Yongxiang	politician, educator, engineer	President of the Chinese Academy of Sciences; Vice Chairman of the National People's Congress	BSc Hydrodynamics (Hydraulic Mechanics) at Zhejiang University, 1959–1964 Lecturer at ZJU since 1981, professor since 1983, president from 1988 to 1995
Chen Mingde	politician	General secretary and vice-president of China National Democratic Construction Association	BSc Electrical Engineering at Zhejiang University, 1958–1962
Zhang Xinsheng	politician	Vice-minister of Ministry of Education, PRC; Vice-president of Chinese Olympic Committee	Studied English and literature at the Department of Foreign Languages of Hangzhou University during 1977–1979
Xie Xuren	politician	Served as the Minister of Finance of China	Studied Industrial Economic Management at Zhejiang University during 1981–1984
Zhu Yanfeng	politician	Former vice-governor of Jilin	BSc Automation at Zhejiang University, Class of 1983
Wang Youcai	human rights defender	Prominent student leaders in the 1986 student demonstrations and the Tiananmen Square protests of 1989	BSc Physics at Zhejiang University, 1983–1987
Sun Zhonghuan	politician	Former mayor of Hangzhou	Studied the postgraduate course of economic management at Hangzhou University from 1997 to 1998
Dong Junshu	politician	former Secretary General of the Discipline Inspection Commission for Shanghai Municipality	BSc Economic at Hangzhou University

== Humanities & culture ==
- Chen Duxiu – communist philosopher, writer
- Hu Qiaomu – communist philosopher, writer
- Wu Han – historian, writer, playwright
- Song Xi – historian, president of Chinese Culture University
- Shao Piaoping – journalist, author, revolutionary
- Xia Yan – playwright, screenwriter
- Wang Xufeng – writer, tea researcher, Mao Dun Literature Prize winner (2000)
- Wu Guanzhong – painter, Ordre des Arts et des Lettres recipient 1991
- Yu Dafu – author, poet
- Chen Daqi – polymath, educator, politician
- Ho Ping-sung – historian, writer, educator; president of Jinan University
- Zheng Xiaocang – writer, educator, translator
- He Xie-hou – educator, president of Peking University.

== Science & engineering ==
=== Mathematical sciences ===
- Chen Jiangong – mathematician
- Wang Yuan – mathematician, president of Chinese Mathematical Society
- Gu Chaohao – mathematician, president of USTC
- Hu Hesheng – mathematician, Noether Lecturer 2002
- Zhu Miaolong – mathematician, president of Qingdao University
- Chuan-Chih Hsiung – geometrician, founder of Journal of Differential Geometry
- Jian-Shu Li – mathematician, president of Hong Kong Mathematical Society
- Shi Zhongci – mathematician
- Xia Daoxing – mathematician
- Chung Tao Yang – topologist
- Yuan-Shih Chow – probabilist
- Lin Fanghua – mathematician, Bôcher Memorial Prize winner, 2002
- Huang Daren – mathematician, president of Sun Yat-sen University
- T. Tony Cai – statistician, COPSS Presidents' Award winner 2008
- Pengfei Guan – geometrician
- Xu-Jia Wang – mathematician, Australian Mathematical Society Medal winner 2002
- M. T. Cheng – mathematician
- Lizhen Ji – mathematician and writer
- Jia Rongqing – mathematician
- Chen-Bo Zhu – mathematician, president of Singapore Mathematical Society
- Xiaoming Liu - computer scientist

=== Meteorology, geology, geography ===
- Ye Duzheng – meteorologist, State Preeminent Science and Technology Award recipient 2005
- Hsiao-Lan Kuo – meteorologist, Carl-Gustaf Rossby Research Medal winner 1970
- Shi Yafeng – geologist, Father of Chinese Glaciology
- Song Xi – geographer
- Xie Xuejing – geochemist, AAG Gold Medal winner 2007
- Ding Zhongli – Vice-president of Chinese Academy of Sciences
- Chang Jen-Hu – geographer, educator

=== Physics, material science ===
- Shiyi Chen – physicist
- Cheng Kaijia – physicist
- He Xiantu – physicist
- Tsung-Dao Lee – physicist, Nobel Prize laureate (physics, 1957)
- Chien-Shiung Wu – physicist, Wolf Prize winner (physics, 1978)
- Zhao Jiuzhang – physicist, Father of Chinese Satellite
- Li Zhijian – physicist
- Shao Xianghua – metallurgist
- Guo Kexin – physicist, metallurgist, crystallographer, Father of Chinese Electron Microscopy
- Hu Ning – physicist, educator
- Xu Liangying – physicist, Andrei Sakharov Prize recipient 2008
- Hsin Pei Soh – physicist, educator
- Hu Jimin – physicist, educator
- Wang Ganchang, physicist

=== Chemistry, biomedical sciences, agricultural sciences ===
- Kwang-Chu Chao – chemist, chemical engineer
- Yang Guanghua – chemical engineer, President of China University of Petroleum
- Rui-Ming Xu – biophysicist
- Wang You – chemist, biochemist
- Xu Guangxian – chemist, president Chinese Chemical Society
- Huang Minlon – organic chemist, pharmaceutical scientist, Honorary-president of Chinese Pharmaceutical Association
- Kun-Liang Guan – biochemist, MacArthur Award winner 1998
- Yang Huanming – biologist
- Tao-Chiuh Hsu – biologist, the 13th president of American Society for Cell Biology
- Binghui Shen – radiobiologist
- Yang Fuyu – biochemist, biophysicist, Father of Chinese Membrane Biology
- Jiang Ximing – zoologist
- Chen Hang – botanist, horticulturist, The Veitch Memorial Medal winner 1990
- Yao Zhen – biologist, oncologist, the 1st President of Asian-Pacific Organization for Cell Biology
- Jin Guozhang – pharmacologist
- Wei Zheng – pharmaceutical scientist
- Qiu Fazu – surgeon, Bundesverdienstkreuz recipient 1985
- Zhu Zuxiang – agricultural scientist
- Jay Gan – agricultural & environmental scientist

=== Computer science ===
- Tao Yang
- Min Zhu

=== Engineering ===
- Lu Yongxiang – President of Chinese Academy of Sciences
- Pan Jiazheng – Vice-president of Chinese Academy of Engineering
- Pan Yunhe – Vice-president of Chinese Academy of Engineering
- Ye Peijian – Chief Commander and Designer of Chang'e 1
- Zhang Libin – roboticist, president of Zhejiang University of Technology
- Zhang Yulin – astronautic engineer, president of NUDT
- Zhu Zhaoxiang – 1st President of Ningbo University
- Du Qinghua – physicist, aeronautic and astronautic engineer
- Hu Haichang – Chairman of the Chinese Society of Vibrational Engineering
- Li Enliang – civil engineer
- Bin He – biomedical engineer
- Liangchi Zhang – mechanical engineer
- Han Zhenxiang – electrical engineer
- Wang Guosong – electrical engineer
- Yu Mao-Hong – engineer
- Tsen-cha Tsao - engineer and educator

=== Economic & social sciences ===
- Teng Wei-Zao – economist, educator

== Industry & business ==
- Min Zhu – co-founder and former president and Chief technical officer of WebEx
- Zhou Chengjian – founder and president of Metersbonwe Group
- Cha Chi Ming – industrialist, entrepreneur, philanthropist, Grand Bauhinia Medal winner 1997
- Duan Yongping – entrepreneur
- Bao Yueqiao – entrepreneur
- Zhu Yanfeng – president, First Automotive Works
- Zhang Zhixiang – steel magnate
- Lu Guanqiu – vehicle parts magnate
- Song Weiping – real estate tycoon
- Shi Yuzhu – entrepreneur
- Wang Jianzhou – chairman and CEO of China Mobile
- Wang Tianpu – President of Sinopec
- Shi Zhengrong – Founder & CEO of Suntech Power
- Pete Lau (Liu Zuohu) – Founder & CEO of OnePlus
- Alex Zhu (Zhu Jun) - former head of TikTok
- Liang Wenfeng – co-founder of High-Flyer and founder of DeepSeek

== Sports ==
- Zhu Qinan – Shooter, 10 m Air Rifle olympic champion, 2004 Athens
- Zhou Suhong – Volleyball player, member of 2003 World Cup and 2004 Athens Olympic Games team champion.
- Sun Yang – Swimmer, 2010 Asian Games, 2012 Summer Olympics and 2013 World Aquatics Championships gold medalist, Olympic and world-record holder.
