= 明德 =

明德, literally meaning "virtue", may refer to:

- Mingde (disambiguation), the Chinese transliteration
- Myeongdeok (disambiguation), the Korean transliteration

== See also ==
- The dictionary definition of 明 at Wiktionary
- The dictionary definition of 德 at Wiktionary
