= Affiliated Hospital of Qingdao University =

The Affiliated Hospital of Qingdao University (Chinese: 青岛大学附属医院)

Geography
- Location: No. 16 Jiangsu Road, Shinan District, Qingdao City, Shandong Province (Shinan Campus), China
- Coordinates: 36.068°N 120.322°E

Organisation
- Type: comprehensive
- Affiliated university: Qingdao University

History
- Founded: 1898

Links
- Website: www.qduh.cn/enhome
- Lists: Hospitals in China

The Affiliated Hospital of Qingdao University is a Grade A tertiary general hospital located in Qingdao, Shandong Province, China. With a history tracible to 1898, it is the largest hospital in Qingdao, integrating medical education, treatment and research.

== History ==
In 1898, after Germany occupied Qingdao, a German field hospital was established, almost simultaneously with the founding of Qingdao City.

In 1904, the Governor's Hospital was founded based on the field hospital.

After World War I, the Governor's Hospital was taken over by the Japanese army and renamed the “Army Hospital”.

In 1916, the hospital was renamed “Qingdao Hospital”.

In 1927, the hospital was renamed "Tongrenhui Hospital".

In 1946, the hospital was renamed the "Affiliated Hospital of National Shandong University".

In 1949, the hospital was renamed "Shandong University School of Medicine Affiliated Hospital".

In 1956, the hospital became "Qingdao Medical College Affiliated Hospital".

In 1966, the hospital was renamed "Qingdao Bethune Hospital".

In 1972, the hospital was renamed "Qingdao Medical College Affiliated Hospital".

1993, the hospital was renamed "Qingdao University School of Medicine Affiliated Hospital".

In 2013, the hospital was renamed the "Affiliated Hospital of Qingdao University".

In 2007, the Laoshan Campus of Affiliated Hospital of Qingdao University was opened.

In 2011, the Huangdao Campus was put into use.

In July 2014, the Shibei Campus officially opened.

In 2020, the Pingdu Campus was founded.

In July 2024, the hospital led the establishment of the Jiaodong Peninsula Ophthalmology Strabismus and Amblyopia Alliance and the Orbital Disease Alliance.

== Subordinate Campuses ==
The hospital currently has five campuses:

=== Shinan Campus ===
The Shinan Campus (main campus) of the Affiliated Hospital of Qingdao University is located at No. 16 Jiangsu Road, Shinan District, Qingdao City. It covers an area of 60,000 square meters, with 120,000 square meters of floor area. This site was originally the location of the Governor's Hospital.

=== Laoshan Campus ===
Laoshan Campus of the Affiliated Hospital of Qingdao University

The Laoshan Campus (East Campus) of the Affiliated Hospital of Qingdao University is located at No. 59, Haier Road, Laoshan District, Qingdao City. It was formed by the reorganization of Qingdao Wanjie Hospital, which was wholly acquired by the Affiliated Hospital of Qingdao University in December 2006, and officially opened in 2007.

=== Huangdao Campus ===
The Huangdao Campus of the Affiliated Hospital of Qingdao University is located at No. 1677, Wutaishan Road, Huangdao District, Qingdao City. It is also known as "West Coast Hospital" or "West Coast Medical Center". It was officially completed and put into use in 2011.

=== Shibei Campus ===
The Shibei Campus of the Affiliated Hospital of Qingdao University is located at No. 7, Jiaxing Road, Shibei District, Qingdao City. It officially opened in July 2014. The original site was the Sifang Machinery Factory Hospital.

=== Pingdu Campus ===
The Pingdu Campus of the Affiliated Hospital of Qingdao University is located at No. 369 Shanghai Road, Pingdu City. The first phase of the project covers an area of approximately 110 acres and opened on December 19, 2020.

== Other information ==
The hospital boasts strong medical resources, with over 5,000 employees, 105 clinical departments, 32 medical technology departments, and 3,700 patient beds. Its annual outpatient and emergency volume ranks first in Shandong Province.

In education, the hospital trains students up to doctoral and postdoctoral levels.

In scientific research, the Affiliated Hospital of Qingdao University totally published 68 papers listed in Nature Index for the time period of 1 July 2025 - 30 June 2026, among which 53 were in Health Sciences, ranking 145th globally and 60th in China in healthcare.

In the 2024 China Hospital and Specialty Reputation Ranking, the Affiliated Hospital of Qingdao University ranked A++ (top-60) in the comprehensive hospital ranking, and 4th in Health Management nationally.

The hospital is the first hospital in Shandong Province to support Alipay payments.

== Controversy ==
=== Patient asked to undress in public ===
On August 25, 2016, Dr. Wu of the Breast Department of the Affiliated Hospital of Qingdao University asked a patient to lift her shirt and remove her bra for examination in front of more than 10 patients and a male intern. Dr. Wu refused the patient's suggestion to enter a separate examination room set up in the consultancy room or to change to a less revealing angle. The director of the publicity department of the Affiliated Hospital of Qingdao University later stated that the doctor was only treating the patient and did not violate the doctor's operating procedures. However, the patient said that other hospitals usually allow patients to be examined by doctors alone behind a curtain or in a separated examination room, and that the doctor in this hospital repeatedly ignored the patient's suggestions and right to choose, even though there was an examination room set up on site.

=== Suspected academic misconduct ===
On September 16, 2020, the Ministry of Science and Technology of the People's Republic of China issued a notice on cases of paper fraud and other violations, in which Zhang Jian of the Affiliated Hospital of Qingdao University was suspected of commissioning a third party to write and submit papers on his behalf. Qingdao University issued a warning to Zhang Jian and disqualified him from applying for science and technology projects and awards for 5 years. It also terminated or revoked his research projects, academic awards, honorary titles, etc. based on his papers.

== See also ==
- Qingdao University
- Qingdao Medical College
- List of hospitals in China
