= Taishan Club =

Former exclusive club in China

- Named after: Mount Tai
- Formation: 1993
- Dissolved: January 20, 2021
- Location: Tai'an, Shandong

Taishan Club (Chinese: 泰山会; pinyin: Tàishān huì) was a Mainland China-based super-rich club founded by Duan Yongji. It was named after Mount Tai, initially registered under the name of the Taishan Industrial Research Institute in 1993.

The house rules of the Taishan Club prohibited its members from taping, recording during meetings, accepting media interviews or inviting officials, discussing politics, and was regarded as the Chinese version of "Freemasonry". It was also compared to the United States-based Skull and Bones Society.

Taishan Club was dissolved on January 20, 2021, and its cancellation had been completed with the relevant department. Before the dissolution of the club, it had 16 members, including Liu Chuanzhi, Duan Yongji, Feng Lun, Lu Zhiqiang, Guo Guangchang, Shi Yuzhu, Li Yanhong, Duan Yongping, Wang Zhongjun, and others. Jack Ma was also a member of the club, but later withdrew due to frequent leave of absence.

There were reports that Taishan Club was disbanded because of major disagreements among its members, but some analysts say it had something to do with the Chinese Communist Party authorities.
