= Choi Jieun =

Korean economist

Jieun Choi
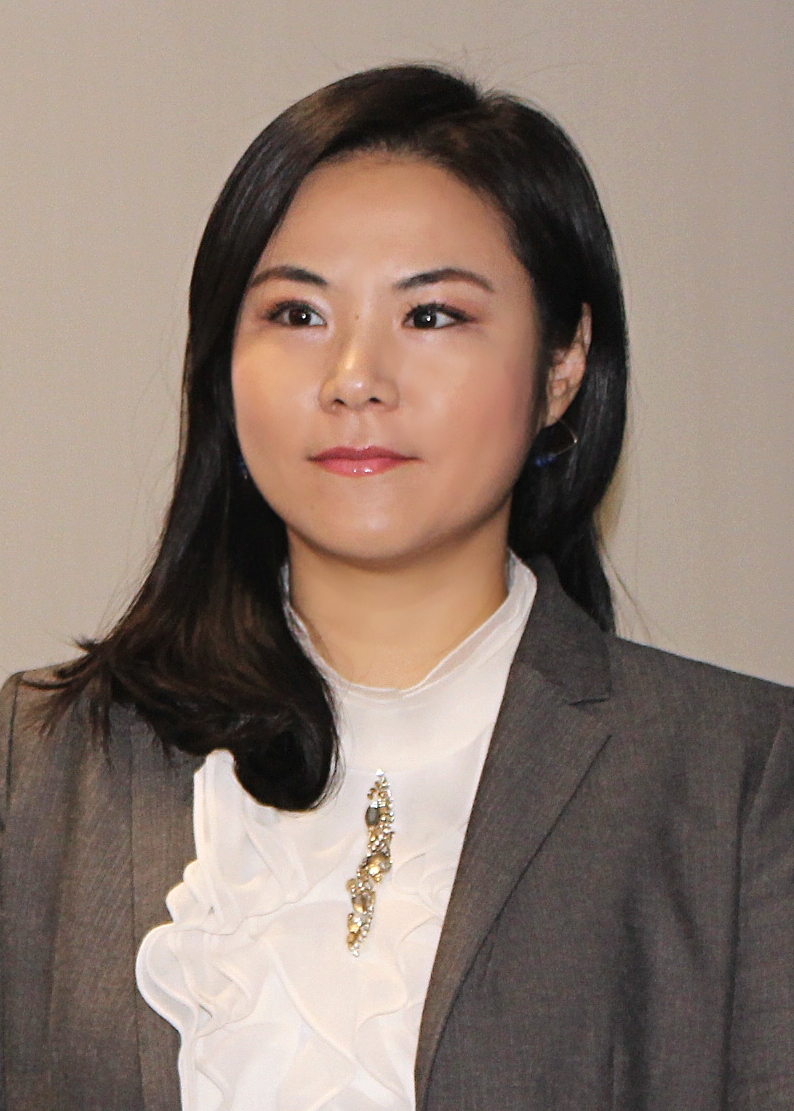
- Born: 21 November 1980 (age 45); Busan, South Korea
- Education: Harvard University; University of Oxford
- Occupation: Economist
- Employer: World Bank
- Website: https://www.jieunchoi.org/

Choi Jieun (Korean: 최지은; Hanja: 崔芝銀; born 21 November 1980) is a South Korean economist. She currently serves as a Senior Economist at the World Bank, specializing in the digital economy and artificial intelligence (AI). Her work combines empirical research and policy analysis on digital economy and economic growth with operational experience in areas such as digital infrastructure, industrial policy, and trade across East Asia, Europe, Africa, and the Middle East. She has previously held academic, public policy, and political roles.

== Education ==
Choi holds three degrees: a bachelor's in economics from Sogang University, a Master of Public Administration in international development from the Harvard Kennedy School, and a doctorate in international development from the University of Oxford. She is a graduate of Myungduk Foreign Language High School.

== Professional Career ==
She has extensive experience as an economist at the World Bank and the African Development Bank, working on digital economy, economic growth, international trade, and development. At the World Bank, she has led and contributed to major flagship, lending operations, and advisory services related to digital infrastructure, digital ecosystem and industrial policies across multiple regions.

From 2004 Choi worked at Samsung Electronics's Telecommunications Network Division overseeing its projects in China and Vietnam before leaving for postgraduate studies at Harvard Kennedy School in 2007.

Upon graduation, Choi joined the African Development Bank via the Young Professionals Programme, becoming its first South Korean staff since 1982, when South Korea officially became a non-regional member. She worked as its country economist for Egypt during the 2011 Arab Spring and was later promoted to senior economist at its research department.

In 2013 Choi then joined the World Bank as its senior economist, assisting former Soviet Union countries' transition to market economies and later Africa's standing in 4th industrial revolution. Before leaving for the general election in 2020, she worked as a senior country economist for China.

== Political career ==
Choi has previously held political and public policy roles in the Republic of Korea. She served as a senior policy advisor and spokesperson to Lee Jae Myung during his candidacy in the 2022 South Korean presidential election, and earlier as a commissioner of the Presidential Policy Planning Committee under President Moon Jae-in.

In January 2020 Choi returned to Korea and entered politics. She was recruited by the Democratic Party for the upcoming legislative election in April. In the 2020 general election, Choi ran for the constituency in Busan – the same constituency Roh Moo-hyun unsuccessfully ran for to overcome regionalism but later became the stepping stone for Roh's presidential campaign. She lost to the incumbent parliamentarian from the main opposition party, Kim Do-eup (Korean: 김도읍), by the smallest margin the democratic candidate lost – a notable figure considering this constituency never elected a democratic parliamentarian since its creation in 1996 and she just entered politics 3 months ago.

In May 2020 Choi was appointed as the international spokesperson of the Democratic Party – the first of its kind in the history of her party and preceding parties.

In the 2021 by-election, she was widely considered as the Democratic Party's candidate for mayor of Busan. In various opinion polls, she ranked second in the suitability of the Democratic Party candidate and firmly in second place among the Democratic Party supporters. However, she announced her intention not to run for the major election because the election was held for the reasons attributable to the Democratic Party. Later, she supported Kim Young-Chun, who later became Democratic Party's nominee for Pusan Major election. Although the Democratic Party lost heavily in the election, Kim Young-chun took first place in the Bukgangseo-eul (Kangseo District and Part of Buk District), where Choi directly led the election.Choi Ji-eun actively pushed to establish the new Gadeok Airport and the law on the new Gadeok Airport, which passed early 2021. Afterwards, Choi was appointed as the chairperson of the special committee for the Busan Gadeok New Airport Promotion of the Democratic Party. Choi was appointed as the chairperson of the special committee for the Busan Gadeok New Airport Promotion of the Democratic Party.

In 2021, Choi joined Lee Jae Myung's presidential campaign as a policy advisor and spokesperson from the Democratic primary. She played a leading role in the design of international economic policy initiatives. During the 2022 presidential campaign, Choi engaged in policy debates on the feasibility and implications of universal basic income and other campaign proposals, in discussions with senior policymakers and experts such as Lee Hye-hoon and Yoon Hee Suk.

During her political career, she contributed to shaping the Democratic Party of Korea’s economic and international policy agenda and related legislation. She served in several policy and advisory roles within the party, including as Vice President of the party-affiliated Democratic Think Tank and Vice Chair of the Policy Committee. She was also a member of the party’s strategic bodies, including the National Economic Advisory Council, the Innovation Committee, and the Special Committee on Semiconductors, contributing to the development of economic, international, and technology-related policy initiatives and legislation.

She left politics in 2022 and returned to her professional career as an economist.

== Other information ==
Choi worked as an adjunct professor at the Graduate School of International Studies at Seoul National University and a member of the Presidential Policy Planning Committee, under the Moon Jae In administration from 2020-2022, taking on major tasks in the field of economic policy including digital trade and digital regulations, including and big tech regulations and small business promotion policies.

== Electoral history ==
Election	Year	District	Party affiliation	Votes	Percentage of votes	Results
21st National Assembly general election	2020	Busan Buk–Gangseo B	Democratic Party	63,146	43.20%	Lost (2nd)
