= Six Lectures About Loneliness =

2009 book by Jiang Xun

Six Lectures on Loneliness
- Publisher: Guangxi Normal University Press
- Publication date: January 10, 2009
- Media type: Print
- Pages: 299
- ISBN: 7563391274

Six Lectures About Loneliness is a 2009 non-fiction book by Chian Hsun, a professor at the Chinese Culture University. The book discusses the concept of loneliness and how it affects different aspects of humanity.

== Synopsis ==
In the book the author splits loneliness into six parts, the flesh, language, revolution, thinking, ethics, and violence. Hsun believes that loneliness is necessary, but that the fear of it could make things worse. The author also challenges the concept of language meanings, saying that words can be ignored or misinterpreted by others, contributing to the feeling of loneliness.
