= Xiaoming (name) =

Xiaoming is a Chinese given name. Notable people with this name include:

- Ai Xiaoming (born 1953), Chinese filmmaker
- Xiaoming Fu, Chinese computer scientist
- Huang Xiaoming (born 1977), Chinese actor
- Li Xiaoming, multiple individuals:
  - Li Xiaoming (born 1996), Chinese footballer
  - Li Xiaoming (biathlete) (born 1958), Chinese cross-country skier
- Liu Xiaoming, multiple individuals:
  - Liu Xiaoming (born 1956), Chinese diplomat
  - Liu Xiaoming (politician) (born 1964), Chinese politician
  - Xiaoming Liu, Chinese-American computer scientist
- Peng Xiaoming (born 1975), Chinese pole vaulter
- Qu Xiaoming (born 1986), Chinese rower
- Shen Xiaoming (born 1963), Chinese politician
- Song Xiaoming (born 1994), Chinese field hockey player
- Wang Xiaoming, multiple individuals:
  - Xiaoming Wang-Dréchou (born 1963), Chinese-French tennis player
  - Xiaoming Wang (paleontologist) (born 1957), Chinese-American paleontologist
- Wen Xiaoming (born 1979), Chinese footballer
- Wu Xiaoming (born 1954), Chinese LGBTQ writer
- Xi Xiaoming (born 1954), Chinese judge
- Xu Xiaoming (born 1984), Chinese curler
- Yu Xiaoming (born 1993), Chinese rugby sevens player
- Zhang Xiaoming (born 1963), Chinese politician

== See also ==
- Emperor Xiaoming of Northern Wei
