= Mingde =

Mingde may refer to:

- Mingde (明德; 934–938), an era name used by the Later Shu emperor Meng Zhixiang
- Mingde (name)
- Mingde Dam, in Miaoli County, Taiwan
- Mingde High School, in Changsha, Hunan, China
- Mingde metro station, in Beitou District, Taipei, Taiwan
- Ming Tak Bank, a bank in Hong Kong

== See also ==
- Empress Mingde (disambiguation)
