= Qingda =

Qingda is an abbreviation of:

- National Tsing Hua University in Hsinchu, Taiwan (國立清華大學; abbreviated 清大, Qīngdà)
- Qingdao University in Qingdao, Shandong, China (青岛大学; abbreviated 青大, Qīngdà)

== See also ==
- Tsinghua University in Beijing, China (清华大学)
