= American Zhu Kezhen Education Foundation =

Educational foundation in the United States

The American Zhu Kezhen Education Foundation (Traditional Chinese: 美國竺可楨教育基金會; Simplified Chinese: 美国竺可桢教育基金会; abbr.:AZKEF), is an educational foundation of Zhejiang University based in United States.

== Introduction ==
The foundation was founded by the Zhejiang University alumni in North America in October 1995. Its designation is to promote the cooperation and between Zhejiang University and American universities. The first president of the foundation was Kwang-Chu Chao.

The foundation is named after the ZJU's former president ZHU Kezhen (aka Coching CHU, Zhu Kezhen is Pinyin spelling).
