= Mingde (name) =

Mingde is the Mandarin Pinyin spelling of a Chinese given name.

People with this name include:

- Chen Mingde (born 1940), a Chinese politician
- Li Mingde (李明德)
  - Li Mingde (born 1996), a Chinese actor
  - Li Mingde, Taiwan Amis campus folk singer
- Shi Mingde (born 1954), a Chinese diplomat
- Shih Ming-te (施明德; Shi Mingde), a statesman and human rights defender in Taiwan (born 1941)
- Mantak Chia (謝明德; Xie Mingde) is a Taoist Master (born 1944)
- Benoît Vermander (born 1960), also known as Wei Mingde (魏明德), a French Jesuit, sinologist, political scientist and painter
