= Zhu Miaolong =

ZHU Miaolong (Traditional Chinese: 竺苗龍, Simplified Chinese: 竺苗龙; born April 1942) is a Chinese mathematician, educator and expert in space technology. He is the former President and current Honorary President of the Qingdao University.

== Biography ==
Zhu was born in Fenghua, Ningbo City, Zhejiang Province. 1966, he graduated from the Department of Mathematics, Zhejiang University. July 1978, he became a lecturer at Northwest Industrial University. 1979, he was promoted into associate professor. He was transferred into the University of Science and Technology of China, and became a professor there. Then he went to Qingdao University in Qingdao, Shandong Province, and became the Vice-president of the university. 1993, he became the President and a dean of the Qingdao University. He has been the Honorary President of Qingdao University since 1997.

== Works ==
Zhu made some contributions to the Chinese space program, especially in the fields of multiple-staged rockets and the optimal orbits for artificial satellites.

- Some Theoretical Problems of the Spaceflight Mechanics (《航天力学中的一些理论问题》, both Chinese and English versions)
- Introduction to the Optimal Orbit (《最佳轨道引论》)
- Optimization for the Multiple-Staged Rocket (《多级火箭的优化理论》)
- Several Problems of Space Flight (《星际飞行中的几个问题》)
