= Unified strength theory =

The unified strength theory (UST). proposed by Yu Mao-Hong is a series of yield criteria (see yield surface) and failure criteria (see Material failure theory). It is a generalized classical strength theory which can be used to describe the yielding or failure of material begins when the combination of principal stresses reaches a critical value.

== Mathematical formulation ==
Mathematically, the formulation of UST is expressed in principal stress state as

$F = {\sigma _1} - \frac{\alpha }{{1 + b}}(b{\sigma _2} + {\sigma _3}) = {\sigma _t},\, {\text{ when }}{\sigma _2} \leqslant \frac{{{\sigma _1} + \alpha {\sigma _3}}}{{1 + \alpha }}$
(1a)

$F' = \frac{1}{{1 + b}}({\sigma _1} + b{\sigma _2}) - \alpha {\sigma _3} = {\sigma _t},\, {\text{ when }} {\sigma _2} \geqslant \frac{{{\sigma _1} + \alpha {\sigma _3}}}{{1 + \alpha }}$
(1b)

where ${\sigma _1},{\sigma _2},{\sigma _3}$ are three principal stresses, ${\sigma _{t}}$ is the uniaxial tensile strength and $\alpha$ is tension-compression strength ratio ($\alpha = {\sigma _t}/{\sigma _c}$). The unified yield criterion (UYC) is the simplification of UST when $\alpha = 1$, i.e.

$f = {\sigma _1} - \frac{1}{{1 + b}}(b{\sigma _2} + {\sigma _3}) = {\sigma _s},{\text{ when }} {\sigma _2} \leqslant \frac{1}{2}({\sigma _1} + {\sigma _3})$
(2a)

$f' = \frac{1}{{1 + b}}({\sigma _1} + b{\sigma _2}) - {\sigma _3} = {\sigma _s},{\text{ when }} {\sigma _2} \geqslant \frac{1}{2}({\sigma _1} + {\sigma _3})$
(2b)

== Limit surfaces ==
The limit surfaces of the unified strength theory in principal stress space are usually a semi-infinite dodecahedron cone with unequal sides. The shape and size of the limiting dodecahedron cone depends on the parameter b and $\alpha$. The limit surfaces of UST and UYC are shown as follows.

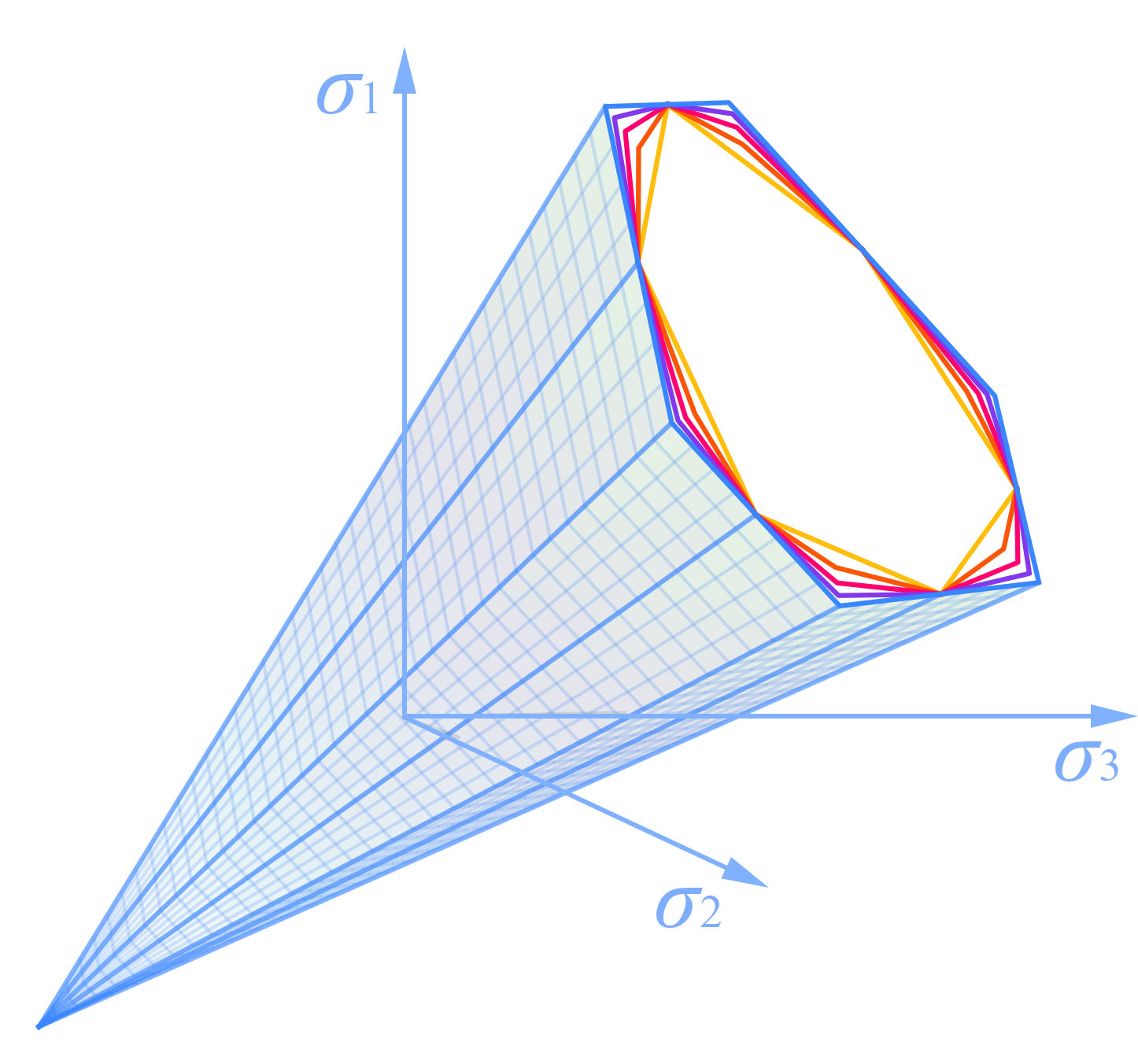
The limit surfaces of UST with $\alpha$=0.6

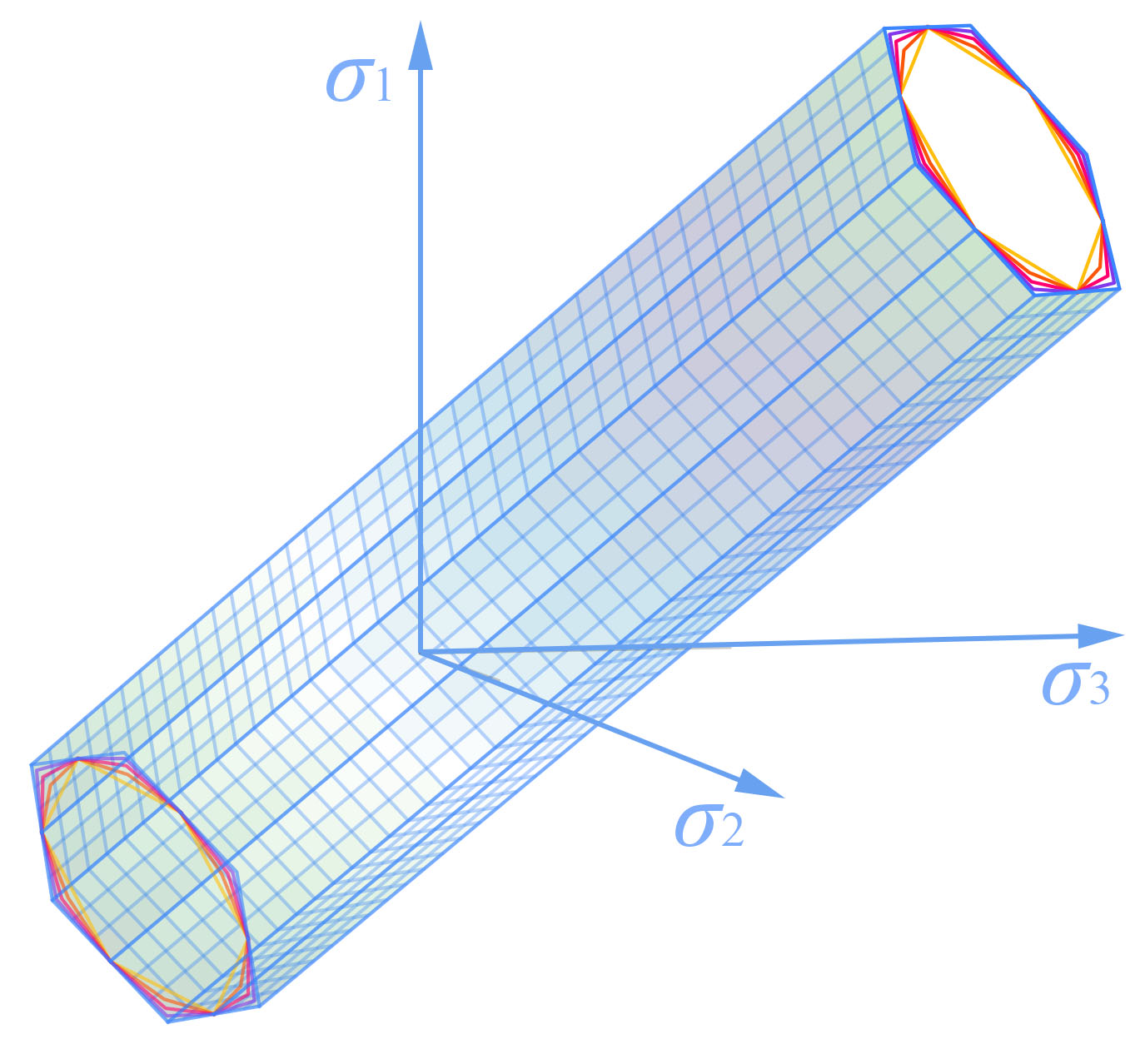
The limit surfaces of UYC

== Derivation ==
Due to the relation (${\tau _{13}} = {\tau _{12}} + {\tau _{23}}$), the principal stress state (${\sigma _1},{\sigma _2},{\sigma _3}$) may be converted to the twin-shear stress state (${\tau _{13}},{\tau _{12}};{\sigma _{13}},{\sigma _{12}}$) or (${\tau _{13}},{\tau _{23}};{\sigma _{13}},{\sigma _{23}}$). Twin-shear element models proposed by Mao-Hong Yu are used for representing the twin-shear stress state. Considering all the stress components of the twin-shear models and their different effects yields the unified strength theory as

$F = {\tau _{13}} + b{\tau _{12}} + \beta ({\sigma _{13}} + b{\sigma _{12}}) = C, {\text{ when }} {\tau _{12}} + \beta {\sigma _{12}} \geqslant {\tau _{23}} + \beta {\sigma _{23}}$
(3a)

$F' = {\tau _{13}} + b{\tau _{23}} + \beta ({\sigma _{13}} + b{\sigma _{23}}) = C, {\text{ when }}{\tau _{12}} + \beta {\sigma _{12}} \leqslant {\tau _{23}} + \beta {\sigma _{23}}$
(3b)

The relations among the stresses components and principal stresses read

${\tau _{13}} = \frac{1}{2}\left( {{\sigma _1} - {\sigma _3}} \right)$, ${\sigma _{13}} = \frac{1}{2}\left( {{\sigma _1} + {\sigma _3}} \right)$
(4a)

${\tau _{12}} = \frac{1}{2}\left( {{\sigma _1} - {\sigma _2}} \right)$, ${\sigma _{12}} = \frac{1}{2}\left( {{\sigma _1} + {\sigma _2}} \right)$
(4b)

${\tau _{23}} = \frac{1}{2}\left( {{\sigma _2} - {\sigma _3}} \right)$, ${\sigma _{23}} = \frac{1}{2}\left( {{\sigma _2} + {\sigma _3}} \right)$
(4c)

The $\beta$ and C should be obtained by uniaxial failure state

${\sigma _1} = {\sigma _t},{\sigma _2} = {\sigma _3} = 0$
(5a)

${\sigma _1} = {\sigma _2} = 0,{\sigma _3} = - {\sigma _{\text{c}}}$
(5b)

By substituting Eqs.(4a), (4b) and (5a) into the Eq.(3a), and substituting Eqs.(4a), (4c) and (5b) into Eq.(3b), the $\beta$ and C are introduced as

$\beta = \frac{{{\sigma _{\text{c}}} - {\sigma _{\text{t}}}}}{{{\sigma _{\text{c}}} + {\sigma _{\text{t}}}}} = \frac{{1 - \alpha }}{{1 + \alpha }}$, $C = \frac{{1 + b{\sigma _{\text{c}}}{\sigma _{\text{t}}}}}{{{\sigma _{\text{c}}} + {\sigma _{\text{t}}}}} = \frac{{1 + b}}{{1 + \alpha }}{\sigma _t}$
(6)

== History ==
The development of the unified strength theory can be divided into three stages as follows.
1. Twin-shear yield criterion (UST with $\alpha = 1$ and $b = 1$)

$f = {\sigma _1} - \frac{1}{2}({\sigma _2} + {\sigma _3}) = {\sigma _t},{\text{ when }} {\sigma _2} \leqslant \frac{{{\sigma _1} + {\sigma _3}}}{2}$
(7a)

$f = \frac{1}{2}({\sigma _1} + {\sigma _2}) - {\sigma _3} = {\sigma _t},{\text{ when }} {\sigma _2} \geqslant \frac{{{\sigma _1} + {\sigma _3}}}{2}$
(7b)

2. Twin-shear strength theory (UST with $b = 1$).

$F = {\sigma _1} - \frac{\alpha }{2}({\sigma _2} + {\sigma _3}) = {\sigma _t}, {\text{ when }}{\sigma _2} \leqslant \frac{{{\sigma _1} + \alpha {\sigma _3}}}{{1 + \alpha }}$
(8a)

$F = \frac{1}{2}({\sigma _1} + {\sigma _2}){\text{ - }}\alpha {\sigma _3} = {\sigma _t},{\text{ when }} {\sigma _2} \geqslant \frac{{{\sigma _1} + \alpha {\sigma _3}}}{{1 + \alpha }}$
(8b)

3. Unified strength theory.

== Applications ==
Unified strength theory has been used in Generalized Plasticity, Structural Plasticity, Computational Plasticity and many other fields
