= Qingdao Medical College =

The Qingdao Medical College (simplified Chinese: 青岛医学院; traditional Chinese: 青島醫學院; pinyin: Qīngdǎo Yīxuéyuàn), full name "Qingdao Medical College of Qingdao University", is the medical school of Qingdao University located in Qingdao, Shandong Province of China. With a history tracible to 1909, the college has developed into a large medical school with 12 affiliated hospitals, integrating medical treatment, education and research.

== History ==
In 1909, the Qingdao Special Higher Medical School was founded in Qingdao, when the city was under the German occupation. The school was also known as the "German-Chinese Special Higher Medical School".

In 1939, during the Japanese occupation of Qingdao, the school was renamed "Qingdao (East Asia) Medical University".

In 1946, after the Japanese surrender, the National Shandong University reopened in Qingdao. And the school became the Medical School of National Shandong University.

In 1956, the school was separated from the university and was renamed "Qingdao Medical College", an independent public school in Qingdao.

During the Cultural Revolution (1966 ~ 1976), admission of students used to be suspended and the school moved to Huimin Prefecture (now Binzhou City).

In 1976, the school moved back to Qingdao.

In 1993, Qingdao Medical College merged with Qingdao University, Shandong Textile Engineering Institute School, and Qingdao Normal School to form the new Qingdao University, and was officially named "Qingdao University College of Medical Science".

In 2012, the college was selected into the First Batch of Pilot Universities for the Excellent Physician Education and Training Program approved by the Ministry of Education and Ministry of Health of China.

In 2015, it was renamed "Medical College of Qingdao University".

In 2020, the college was renamed "Qingdao Medical College of Qingdao University", jointly built by the Qingdao Municipal Government and Qingdao University, 7 new directly affiliated hospitals were added. In the same year, project "Research, Clinical Application and Industrialization of Computer-Assisted Surgery System for Pediatric Hepatobiliary and Pancreatic Surgery" of the college won the Second Prize of National Science and Technology Progress Award, 2019.

In 2021, Qingdao Medical College ranked 18th out of 110 independent medical schools in China, according to the Chinese Academy of Medical Sciences.

== Programs ==
Qingdao Medical College offers programs for undergraduate, master and doctoral degrees, including

- Bachelor of Medicine (5 years).
- Bachelor of Medicine, Bachelor of Surgery (M.B.B.S., 6 years).
- Master of Medicine (8 years).

== Affiliated Hospitals ==
There are 12 affiliated hospitals and 3 teaching hospitals, with a total of over 20,000 beds. Among them, the Clinical Medical Colleges are as follows

- Affiliated Hospital of Qingdao University (First Clinical Medical College of Qingdao University)
- Affiliated Yantai Yuhuangding Hospital (Yantai Yuhuangding Clinical Medical College of Qingdao University)
- Affiliated Qingdao Haici Hospital (Qingdao Haici Clinical Medical College of Qingdao University)
- Affiliated Weihai Municipal Second Hospital (Weihai Municipal Second Hospital Clinical Medical College of Qingdao University)
- Affiliated Qingdao Women and Children's Hospital (Qingdao Women and Children's Clinical Medical College of Qingdao University)
- Affiliated Weihai Central Hospital (Weihai Central Clinical Medical College of Qingdao University)
- Affiliated Tai'an Central Hospital (Tai'an Central Clinical Medical College of Qingdao University)
- Affiliated Shandong Provincial Maternal and Child Health Hospital (Shandong Provincial Maternal and Child Health Clinical Medical College of Qingdao University)
- Affiliated Qingdao Third People's Hospital (Qingdao Third People's Hospital Clinical Medical College of Qingdao University)

== Other information ==
Currently, Qingdao Medical College has 411 full-time faculty members. And there are 4,508 undergraduate students, 3,583 master's and doctoral students, and 300 international students.

In academic research, the college published 74 papers listed in Nature Index for the Time frame of 1 April 2025 - 31 March 2026, including 60 in Health sciences. Six disciplines ranked in the top 1% ESI, with Clinical Medicine in the top 0.129%.

There is international cooperations with institutions in nearly 20 countries, including the United States, the United Kingdom, Australia, Japan and Switzerland.

Contact Address: 38 Dengzhou Road, Qingdao (266021) Shandong, China.

== See also ==
- Qingdao University
- Shandong University
- List of medical schools in China
