= Zhang Libin =

Chinese roboticist

Zhang Libin (Traditional Chinese: 張立彬, Simplified Chinese: 张立彬; born 1955), is a well-known roboticist in China and the current President of the Zhejiang University of Technology.

== Biography ==
Zhang was born in August 1955 in Yiwu, Jinhua City, Zhejiang Province. He did his undergraduate and postgraduate studies all at Zhejiang Agricultural University (current Zhejiang University). In 1985, he became a lecturer in the Department of Agricultural Engineering, Zhejiang Agricultural University, and later was promoted to the director of the department and the dean position. In September 1994, he was transferred to the Zhejiang University of Technology (ZJUT), and became its Vice-president. March 2005, he became the 3rd President of the Zhejiang University of Technology.

Zhang also serves as a vice-president of the Zhejiang Provincial Science and Technology Association, and a director of the Chinese Society for Agricultural Engineering (中國農業工程學會/中国农业工程学会).

Zhang's research mainly focuses on the automation and robotics both in agriculture and industrial mass production.
