= Chao Liang-yen =

Taiwanese politician

Chao Liang-yen (Chinese: 趙良燕; born 9 March 1954) is a Taiwanese politician.

== Education ==
Chao was educated at Chengcheng Elementary School and Kaohsiung Municipal Fongshan Junior High School before graduating from Kaohsiung Municipal Kaohsiung Girls' Senior High School. She then studied journalism at Chinese Culture University and later pursued a Master of Arts in political science at the same institution.

== Political career ==
Chao served two terms on the Fongshan City Council, and was subsequently elected to the National Assembly in 1991. She remained a member of the assembly until 1996. Chao contested the 2001 legislative elections, and won election to the Legislative Yuan as a People First Party representative of Kaohsiung County. She was reelected in 2004, and stepped down from the Legislative Yuan at the end of her second term in 2008. During Chao's second term as a member of the Legislative Yuan, she frequently opined on military affairs, and served for a period as convener of the legislature's defense committee. She later served as People First Party caucus whip.
