= Zhang Zhixiang =

Chinese entrepreneur

Zhang Zhixiang 张志祥 張志祥
- Born: 1967 (age 58–59); Shangyu, Shaoxing, Zhejiang, China
- Education: ZJU & ZJUT
- Occupations: Founder & President; Jianlong Steel

Zhang Zhixiang (simplified Chinese: 张志祥; traditional Chinese: 張志祥; pinyin: Zhāng Zhìxiáng; born 1967 in Shangyu, Shaoxing, Zhejiang), is a Chinese entrepreneur. He's regarded as the Magnate of Steel in China.

== Career ==
He studied both at Zhejiang University (ZJU) and Zhejiang University of Technology (ZJUT), and graduated from the Department of Chemical Engineering at ZJUT in 1989.

1994, he founded his own company, the Zhongxiang Industry Corp.(忠祥實業公司/忠祥实业公司) in his hometown Shaoxing. He dramatically expanded his business not only within Zhejiang Province but also to Shanghai, Nanjing, Beijing, Tianjin, Tangshan, etc., including 13 different regions in China. 1999, he started investing in steel industry, he bought in the factory of Zunhua Steel (遵化市鋼鐵廠/遵化市钢铁厂), further developed it into the current famous Jianlong Steel (建龍鋼鐵/建龙钢铁), which is the largest private steel producer in China.

Zhang is the current President of Tangshan Jianlong Industrial Co., LTD. (唐山建龍實業有限公司/唐山建龙实业有限公司), whose headquarters are located in Tangshan.

In 2013's Hurun Report, he was ranked as 59th richest in China with an estimated fortune of $2.8 billion. In 2006's Hurun Report, Zhang was regarded as the Magnate of Steel in China. In 2007's Hurun Report, Zhang was ranked as one of the top three richest individuals in China's steel industry. In 2007's Forbes Mainland China Rich List (福佈斯中國富豪榜/福布斯中国富豪榜)- The China's Richest People, Zhang was ranked No.41 with 9.75 billion Chinese Yuan (approximately 1.4 billion US$).

Zhang is also an Executive Director of the China Steel Industry Association(CSIA, 中國鋼鐵工業協會/中国钢铁工业协会).

Zhang is also linked to be a part of Peter Storrie's consortium to buy the Portsmouth Football Club

== See also ==
- List of people by net worth of the People's Republic of China
- Forbes Mainland China Rich List 2007(Chinese)
- Zhang Zhixiang's biography at Sina Finance (Chinese)
- "ZHANG ZHIXIANG, CHINA'S NO.1 PRIVATE STEEL MAGNATE". December 2006.
