= Li Enliang =

Chinese civil engineer and educator

Li Enliang (or E.L.li) (Chinese: 李恩良; 1912–2008) was a Chinese civil engineer and educator. Li was a former Vice-president of Zhejiang University and former President of the Zhejiang University of Technology.

== Life ==
Li was born in Xinning (新宁, current Taishan: 台山), Guangdong Province in 1912. Li received BEng in civil engineering from Zhijiang University (之江大学, also known as Hangchow University, which later was merged into Zhejiang University) in Hangzhou, Zhejiang Province.

Li did his further studies in the United States. Li obtained MSc from the University of Michigan in Ann Arbor in 1939. In 1941 Li obtained PhD from Cornell University.

Li went back to China after his study in the US, and was promoted to associate professor at Zhejiang University in Hangzhou, and professor at Fudan University in Shanghai.

After 1949, Li was professor of civil engineering at Zhijiang University before the university was dissociated and merged into Zhejiang University. Li was transferred to professor of Zhejiang University, and was the Chair of its Department of Civil Engineering. Li was former Vice-president of Zhejiang University.

Li was the President of Hangzhou Institute of Engineering (杭州工学院). In Dec 1981, Li was pointed the President of the Zhejiang University of Technology, till Dec 1983.

Li died in Hangzhou on 28 July 2008, at age of 96.
