= Myeongdeok =

Myeongdeok may refer to:

- Myeongdeok station in Daegu, South Korea
- Myungduk Foreign Language High School in Seoul, South Korea
