= Chen Yin-ho =

Taiwanese architect and politician

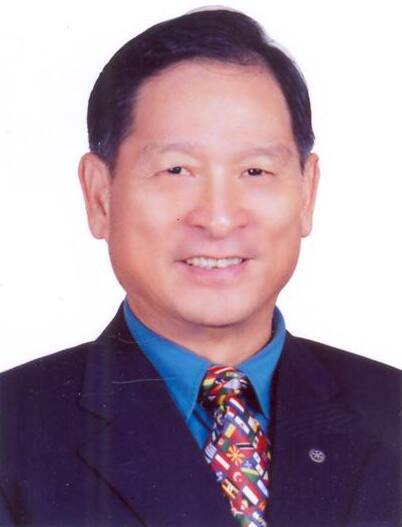
Chen Yin-ho (2005)

Chen Yin-ho (Chinese: 陳銀河) is a Taiwanese architect and politician.

== Education and career ==
After earning his bachelor's and master's degree in engineering science from Chinese Culture University, Chen began working as an architect. He led the National Association of Architects of the Republic of China and the Taiwan Architects Association. He also served on the Construction Technique Review Committee and the Urban and Regional Planning Commission, both convened by the Ministry of the Interior.

Chen was ranked fifth on the Taiwan Solidarity Union party list, and elected to the Sixth Legislative Yuan in the 2004 legislative election. After Robert Tsao penned and published an open letter in February 2005 stating that TSU members were considered "clowns" by members of the public, TSU-affiliated legislators Lo Chih-ming, David Huang, Tseng Tsan-teng, and Chen sued Tsao for libel. Later that year, Chen, Huang Wei-cher, and Lai Shin-yuan filed a lawsuit alleging that Yen Ching-chang had violated Article 14-1 of the Civil Servant Services Act while serving as Taiwan's representative to the World Trade Organization. In February 2006, Chen hosted a press conference, at which Hu Ya-ping, deputy director of the Aviation Police Office, announced that reporters would be barred from accessing restricted areas of the Chiang Kai-shek International Airport unless a special event was planned, or their employer had applied for and been granted approval to report from the airport. In March 2007, Chen and his legislative colleague Kuo Su-chun expressed anger regarding the repeated absences of education minister Tu Cheng-sheng from legislative hearings. In November of that year, Chen and Lo Chih-ming drew attention to disparities in funding distributed to Academia Sinica's Genomics Research Center compared to the national academy's Institute of Cellular and Organismic Biology. During his tenure as a legislator, Chen led a task force convened to reduce hunting of the gray-faced buzzard.
