= Keum-Shik Hong =

South Korean mechanical engineer (born 1957)

- Born: August 25, 1957 (age 68); Mungyeong, South Korea
- Education: Seoul National University, B.S.; Columbia University, M.S., University of Illinois at Urbana-Champaign, M.S. and Ph.D.
- Occupations: Mechanical engineer, academic, author, and researcher
- Scientific career
- Fields: Adaptive control, Brain-computer interfaces, Neuromodulation, functional near-infrared spectroscopy
- Institutions: Pusan National University, South Korea (1993–2022); Institute For Future, Qingdao University, China (2022-date)

Keum-Shik Hong (Korean: 홍금식; Hanja: 洪金植; born 1957) is a South Korean mechanical engineer, academic, author, and researcher. He is a professor emeritus in the School of Mechanical Engineering at Pusan National University. He is also a Distinguished Professor in the Institute For Future, Qingdao University, China.

== Education and early career ==
Hong was born in Mungyeong, South Korea, in 1957. He received his bachelor's degree in Mechanics & Design from Seoul National University in 1979, and a master's degree in Mechanical Engineering from Columbia University, New York, in 1987. He then enrolled at the University of Illinois at Urbana-Champaign (UIUC), and earned both a master's degree in Applied Mathematics and a Ph.D. degree in Mechanical Engineering in 1991. Following his military service at Air Defense Academy during 1980–1982, he held brief appointments as Visiting Researcher at Bridgestone Tire Company, and Ricardo Consulting Engineers in 1984. From 1982 to 1985, he was associated with Deawoo Heavy Industry, Incheon. After serving as Research Associate at UIUC until 1992, he joined the School of Mechanical Engineering at Pusan National University in 1993. His research primarily focuses on brain-computer interface, nonlinear systems theory, adaptive control, distributed parameter systems, autonomous vehicles, and innovative control applications in brain engineering.

Hong help appointment as a Premier Professor at Pusan National University in 2011, and as president at Institute of Control, Automation and Systems (ICROS) in 2015. From 2020 to 2021, he served as a President for Asian Control Association. He was appointed as Editor-in-Chief for Journal of Mechanical Science and Technology from 2008 to 2011, and is currently serving as Editor-in-Chief for International Journal of Control, Automation and Systems.

== Research ==
Hong is most known for his research on brain computer interfaces, port automation, adaptive control, automation and robotics, and innovative control applications in brain engineering. His Integrated Dynamics and Control Engineering Laboratory was designated a National Research Laboratory by the Ministry of Science and Technology of Korea in 2003. In 2009, he introduced a new field named cogno-mechatronics engineering and established the Department of Cogno-Mechatronics Engineering at PNU.

=== Adaptive estimation techniques ===
Hong developed the adaptive control theory for parabolic partial differential equations (PDEs), which was the first work on adaptive control on distributed parameter systems described by parabolic type. He highlighted the applications of developed algorithm in terms of controlling heat transfer systems, boiler systems, and combustion systems, and also suggested that the persistency of excitation condition for PDE should be investigated in relation to time variable, spatial variable, and boundary conditions. In 2002, he developed a road adaptive gainscheduling control for car-suspension systems, and implemented the developed algorithm in an automobile company in Korea. He also developed a sliding-mode control technique for mobile harbor, which enabled mobile harbor to transport containers to shallower water where they can be offloaded at existing conventional ports. While exploring the adaptive neural tracking control for a class of non-affine pure-feedback systems, he introduced a separation technique to decompose unknown functions of all time-varying delayed states into a series of continuous functions of each delayed state.

=== Brain imaging using near-infrared light ===
Hong introduced a novel research field on brain imaging using near-infrared light with a purpose to develop a new brain imaging modality that can substitute the function magnetic resonance imaging (fMRI) technique. He demonstrated that the machine can measure the time variations of oxy-hemoglobin and deoxy-hemoglobin using near-infrared light is called the functional near-infrared spectroscopy (fNIRS), and can also be employed to use bundle configured (mesh arrayed) LEDs in the range of wavelength range 750-850 nm and an array of photo diodes as emitters and detectors. In 2012, he presented and explored state-space hemodynamic model, and focused on the detection of event-related hemodynamic response to neuroactivation. He found out that proposed method has the capability to estimate event-related intra- and inter-activation dynamics and thereby outperforms the classical Gaussian approximation method.

== Awards/Honors ==
- 1998 - Gold Medal: Real-Time Plant/Controller Design Contest, Engineering (Research Center for Advanced Control and Instrumentation, SNU)
- 1999 - Technology Award, Pusan National University
- 2003 - National Research Lab, The Ministry of Science and Technology, Korea
- 2003 - Fumio Harashima Mechatronics Award (ICASE)
- 2005 - Member, National Academy of Engineering of Korea
- 2005 - Fellow, Institute of Control, Robotics and Systems, Korea
- 2006 - Certificate of Outstanding Service, Automatica, IFAC
- 2007 - Presidential Medal (no. 160708) (President Roh Moo-hyun, 16th President of Korea, 2003–2008) (The 40th Science Day)
- 2009 - Achievement Award & Certificate of Appreciation for ICCAS-SICE
- 2016 - IEEE Academic Award, ICROS
- 2019 - Fellow, IEEE
- 2019 - Fellow, The Korean Academy of Science and Technology
- 2022 - Service Merit Medal, Korea (President Yoon Suk-yeol)

== Bibliography ==
=== Books ===
- Control Systems Engineering (1999) ISBN 89-7088-797-0
- Control Experiment Using Two PCs (1999) ISBN 89-7088-796-2
- Future Electrical Vehicles (2011) ISBN 978- 89-7283-865-4
- Dynamics and Control of Industrial Cranes (2019) ISBN 978-981-13-5769-5
- Control of Axially Moving Systems (2021) ISBN 978-981-16-2914-3

=== Selected articles ===
- Hong, K. S., Sohn, H. C., & Hedrick, J. K. (2002). Modified skyhook control of semi-active suspensions: A new model, gain scheduling, and hardware-in-the-loop tuning. J. Dyn. Sys., Meas., Control, 124(1), 158–167.
- Ngo, Q. H., & Hong, K. S. (2010). Sliding-mode antisway control of an offshore container crane. IEEE/ASME transactions on mechatronics, 17(2), 201–209.
- He, W., Ge, S. S., How, B. V. E., Choo, Y. S., & Hong, K. S. (2011). Robust adaptive boundary control of a flexible marine riser with vessel dynamics. Automatica, 47(4), 722–732.
- Naseer, N., & Hong, K. S. (2013). Classification of functional near-infrared spectroscopy signals corresponding to the right-and left-wrist motor imagery for development of a brain–computer interface. Neuroscience letters, 553, 84–89.
- Naseer, N., & Hong, K. S. (2015). fNIRS-based brain-computer interfaces: a review. Frontiers in human neuroscience, 9, 3.
