= Xu Liangying =

Chinese physicist (1920–2013)

Xu Liangying (simplified Chinese: 许良英; traditional Chinese: 許良英; 3 May 1920 – 28 January 2013) was a Chinese physicist, translator and a historian and philosopher of natural science.

== Biography ==
Xu was born in Linhai of Taizhou, Zhejiang on May 3 of 1920. Xu graduated from the Department of Physics of Zhejiang University in 1942. Xu was a student of Shu Xingbei and Wang Ganchang.

Xu was an editor of Chinese Science Bulletin (科学通报), a major Chinese science journal. Xu was treated unfairly during Mao Zedong's Anti-Rightist Campaign which started in 1957, and he was sent back to his hometown to undergo "reform through labour" (laogai). After the end of the Cultural Revolution, Xu was politically rehabilitated and returned to work in Beijing.

Xu was a longtime researcher at the Institute for the History of Natural Science, Chinese Academy of Sciences (中国科学院自然科学史研究所).

== Work ==
Xu's main interests were in the history of science, the philosophy of science (especially of physics), and the relations between science and human society. Xu's The Collected Works of Albert Einstein (《爱因斯坦文集》) currently is the most comprehensive Chinese translational version of Albert Einstein's work.

== Award ==
Xu received the second Andrei Sakharov Prize, from the American Physical Society (APS) in 2008.
