= Kwang-Chu Chao =

American chemist and chemical engineer

Kwang-Chu Chao (Traditional Chinese: 趙廣緒; Simplified Chinese: 赵广绪; June 7, 1925 - October 12, 2013), was an American chemist and chemical engineer.

Chao was the Harry Creighton Pfeffer Distinguished Professor Emeritus of Chemical Engineering at Purdue University. He was also the President of American Zhu Kezhen Education Foundation.

Chao graduated (B.S.) from the department of chemistry, National Chekiang University (aka Zhejiang University) in 1948. He obtained his M.S. (1952) and Ph.D. (1956) both from the University of Wisconsin.

== Works ==
Books written and edited by Chao:

- Phase Equilibrium in Coal Liquefaction Processes (Author: Kwang-chu Chao)
- Equations of State in Engineering and Research (Editor: Kwang-chu Chao; Author: Robert L. Robinson Jr.; ISBN 0-8412-0500-0, ISBN 978-0-8412-0500-0; Publisher: American Chemical Society; Dec 1979)
- Applied Thermodynamics (Author: Kwang-chu Chao; ISBN B000HDABIG; Publisher: American Chemical Society; 1968)
- Thermodynamics of Fluid - An Introduction to Equilibrium Theory (Author: Kwang-chu Chao)
