= Meters/bonwe =

Chinese clothing company

Metersbonwe Group 上海美特斯邦威服饰股份有限公司

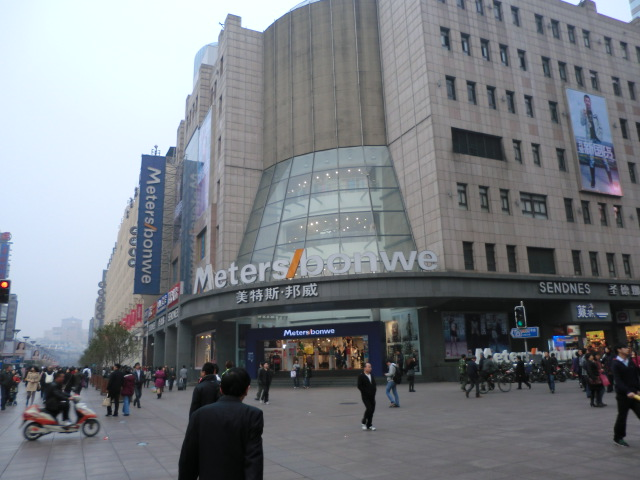
- Type: Private company
- Industry: Textiles and clothing
- Founded: 1995
- Founder: Zhou Chengjian
- Headquarters: Shanghai, China
- Area served: China
- Website: www.metersbonwe.com

Metersbonwe Group (Chinese: 上海美特斯邦威服饰股份有限公司), marketed as Meters/bonwe is China's leading casualwear apparel company. Metersbonwe opened its first store in Wenzhou on April 22, 1995. By the beginning of 2007, the company operated around 1,800 stores across China and had over 5,000 employees. In 2006 the Group's retail sales exceeded RMB 4 billion, making Metersbonwe the largest casualwear retail brand in the country. The company targets 18- to 25-year-old male and female consumers. Their corporate slogan is "Be Different" (不走寻常路).

== History ==
Metersbonwe was created by President and Founder, Zhou Chengjian. In the early 1990s he ventured to Wenzhou after borrowing 200,000 yuan (US$24,691). He worked everyday selling clothes in the daytime and tailoring clothes in the evening. In 1992 he tailored thousands of winter coats for other factories and started to make enough to build his own brand.

By using franchisees and building a strong team of French and local designers, the company grew by more than 30% every year. The brand quickly catered to the needs of a young and increasingly fashion conscious consumer base. By focusing on reasonable prices, the company gained increasing popularity.

The company invited Taiwanese star Jay Chou to become the brand's image ambassador in 2003. As a result, MetersBonwe became the best selling brand for the year 2004, evaluated by the China National Garments Association. In 2005 its annual earnings with the sale of the brand's clothes netted some 3 billion yuan (US$370 million).

In its new Shanghai Headquarters, opened in late 2005, the company opened a fashion museum for the public. In the museum, there are ancient and ethnic costumes and accessories, many not even found in national museums. Some parts of the collection will now be relocated to a new store opening up in late 2007 on Nanjing Road in Shanghai.

== Controversy ==
=== Environmental Practices ===
In July 2011, the Metersbonwe Group - along with other major fashion and sportswear brands including Nike, Adidas and Abercrombie & Fitch - was the subject of a report by the environmental group Greenpeace entitled 'Dirty Laundry'. The Metersbonwe Group was accused of working with suppliers in China who, according to the findings of the report, contributed to the pollution of the Yangtze and Pearl Rivers. Samples taken from one facility belonging to the Youngor Group located on the Yangtze River Delta and another belonging to the Well Dyeing Factory Ltd. located on a tributary of the Pearl River Delta revealed the presence of hazardous and persistent hormone disruptor chemicals, including alkylphenols, perfluorinated compounds and perfluorooctane sulfonate.
