= Shu Xingbei =

Chinese physicist and educator (1905–1983)

- 束星北
- Born: October 1, 1907; Jiangdu County, Jiangsu, Qing Empire
- Died: October 30, 1983 (aged 76); Qingdao, Shandong, China
- Education: Hangchow University (1924); Cheeloo University (1925); Baker University (1926); University of California, San Francisco (1927); University of Edinburgh (1928-1930); University of Cambridge (1930); Massachusetts Institute of Technology (1930-1931)
- Spouse: Ge Chuhua (葛楚華)
- Children: Shu Yuexin (束越新); Shu Huxin (束滬新); Shu Xiaoxin (束孝新); Shu Qingxin (束慶新); Shu Yixin (束義新); Shu Runxin (束潤新); Shu Meixin (束美新)
- Parent(s): Shu Rilu (束日璐); Shu Sanniang (束三娘)
- Scientific career
- Fields: Quantum Mechanics, Relativity, Radar, meteorology
- Workplaces: Zhejiang University; Qingdao Medical College; State Oceanic Administration
- Doctoral advisor: E. T. Whittaker; Charles Galton Darwin; Dirk Jan Struik
- Notable students: Tsung-Dao Lee; Cheng Kaijia; Chien-Shiung Wu; Xu Liangying; Hu Jimin

Shu Xingbei (Chinese: 束星北; pinyin: Shù Xīngběi; October 1, 1905 - October 30, 1983), also known as Hsin Pei Soh, was a Chinese physicist and educator.

== Life ==
=== Early years ===
Shu was born on 1 October 1905, in Hanjiang, Jiangsu Province. In 1924, he entered Hangchow University (aka Zhijiang University 之江大学, now named Zhejiang University) in Hangzhou, Zhejiang Province and a year later transferred to the Department of Physics at Cheeloo University in Shandong Province.

=== Travel/study in USA & Europe ===
In 1926, Shu went to study physics in the United States, where he initially studied at Baker University in Baldwin City, Kansas, but later transferred to the University of California, San Francisco (UCSF). During this time, Shu was quite active in various social and political activities and communities, and it is said that he even once joined the Communist Party USA.

In July 1927, Shu left the US and travelled through Japan, Korea, Manchuria, Moscow, and Warsaw, eventually reaching Germany where he principally visited Berlin, Hannover and Hamburg. Shu then went to the UK, where, in October 1928 he enrolled in the University of Edinburgh to study mathematics and physics under E. T. Whittaker and Charles Galton Darwin, obtaining his MSc after one year. Finally, in February 1930 Shu went to the University of Cambridge, and worked under Arthur Stanley Eddington, who that August advised him to return to the US to the Massachusetts Institute of Technology (MIT).

Shu took this advice, becoming a teaching assistant at the MIT Department of Mathematics and obtaining a second MSc under Dirk Jan Struik.

=== At Zhejiang University ===
In September 1931, Shu returned to China, largely due to pressure from his mother to marry his fiancée, Ge Chuhua. Shu's first position was in physics at the Whampoa Military Academy but in September 1932, invited by the chair (Zhang Shaozhong 张绍忠) of the Department of Physics of Zhejiang University, he began teaching there. In August 1935, Shu became chairperson of the Department of Mathematics of Jinan University, which was at that time located in Shanghai. Shu was also an adjunct lecturer at Jiaotong University. In April 1936, President Coching Chu of Zhejiang University invited him to return to that institution, where, in August 1936, Shu was promoted to the rank of associate professor, then in 1937, professor. At Zhejiang University, he collaborated closely with Kan-Chang Wang. During this period, some famous students of his include: Cheng Kaijia, Xu Liangying, Hu Jimin, and Zhou Zhicheng (周志成). Most notably, one of his students, Tsung-Dao Lee went on to win the 1957 Nobel Prize for Physics for his work on the violation of parity conservation in weak interactions; Lee (together with Chen-Ning Yang) was awarded the prize for the theory. Another student of his was Chien-Shiung Wu, who received recognition for the experimental verification of the parity violation. She received in 1978 the Wolf Prize in physics.

=== From 1949 to 1979 ===
In 1952, Shu was transferred to the Department of Physics at Shandong University in Jinan, Shandong Province, then in 1954 to its Department of Oceanography.

In 1956, classified as a leader of anti-revolutionary forces, Shu was purged. In June 1958, during the Anti-Rightist Movement, Shu was denounced as an ultra-rightist and an anti-revolutionary. Under the program of "reform through labor" (laogai), he was sent to work on the construction of the Yuezikou Reservoir (月子口水库) in Qingdao. In 1960, Shu was transferred to the Qingdao Medical College as a teacher, although he was also obliged to clean toilets in the college and to wash lab equipment.

On 11 September 1974, Shu partially regained his normal life. In 1978, Shu was transferred to the Chinese State Oceanic Administration where he became a professor and senior researcher for oceanic dynamics at its First Research Institute of Oceanography (第一海洋研究所). In the 1970s, Shu did successful calculations for the Pacific Ocean test of the Dongfeng V intercontinental ballistic missile. In 1979, when the Oceanic Physics Branch (海洋物理分会) of the Chinese Society of Oceanography (中国海洋学会) was established in Guangzhou, Shu was elected its honorary director-general.

In December 1979, the Chinese government completely removed Shu's classification as a rightist and anti-revolutionary, restoring his reputation.

=== From 1979 to his death ===
In August 1981, Shu was elected honorary director-general of the Shandong Society of Physics (山东物理学) and, in that same year, he was named honorary director of the Qingdao Society of Physics (青岛市物理学会). Shu Xingbei died on 30 October 1985, at the age of 77.

== Personal life ==
Shu Xingbei married Ge Chuhua (葛楚華) in 1931. The couple had seven children: Shu Yuexin (束越新), Shu Huxin (束滬新), Shu Xiaoxin (束孝新), Shu Qingxin (束慶新), Shu Yixin (束義新), Shu Runxin (束潤新) and Shu Meixin (束美新).

== Selected publications ==
- Soh, Hsin P., A new law of planetary distances and orbital velocities, Popular Astronomy, Vol. 35, p. 327
- Soh, Hsin P. (Nov 1930), "The Non-Statical Solution of Einstein's Law of Gravitation in a Spatially Symmetrical Field", Phys. Rev., vol. 36, no. 9, p. 1515, Bibcode:1930PhRv...36.1515S, doi:10.1103/PhysRev.36.1515.
- Soh, Hsin P. (15 January 1933), "Theory of Gravitation and Electromagnetism", Chinese J. Physics (Acta Physica Sinica), vol. 1, no. 1, pp. 74–81.
- Hsin P. Soh; Theory of gravitation and electromagnetism, 1934, 国立浙江大学科学报告 (Science reports, University of Chekiang), 1(1):135-142
- Hsin Pei Soh; Relativity transformations connecting two systems in arbitrary acceleration. Nature, 1946, 58:99-100
- Hsin Pei Soh, Mu-Hsien Wang & Su-Chin Kiang; Relative Nature of Electromagnetic Radiation; Nature 157, 809-809 (15 June 1946) | doi:10.1038/157809a0.

=== Books ===
- Selected Academic Works of Shu Xingbei (《束星北学术论文选集》); Ocean Press; ISBN 978-7-5027-6890-4; 2007.
- Special Relativity (textbook) (《狭义相对论》); Qingdao Press; ISBN 7-5436-1383-2; 1995.
