= Zhang Mengjin =

Chinese politician

Zhang Mengjin (simplified Chinese: 章猛进; traditional Chinese: 章猛進), is a former Chinese provincial politician from Zhejiang Province. He most recently served as vice-chairman of the Zhejiang People's Congress. He was also the executive vice-governor of the Zhejiang Province, and the former Chinese Communist Party Committee Secretary of Ningbo.

== Biography ==
Zhan was born in October, 1946 in Yuyao, Zhejiang Province. He studied both in Hangzhou University (later merged with Zhejiang University) and the Central Party School of the Chinese Communist Party. He began his professional career in August 1968.

In April 1971, Zhang joined the Chinese Communist Party (CCP). He was the CCP Committee Secretary of Fenghua, then Vice-mayor of Ningbo.

Zhang was the General Director and Secretary of the Water Resources Department of Zhejiang Provincial Government. He was the Executive Vice-governor of Zhejiang Province, also a member of the Zhejiang Provincial Party Standing Committee. He retired from active politics in February 2007, and became a vice-chairman of the Zhejiang People's Congress.
