= Bao Yueqiao =

Chinese businessman and go player

- Born: 1967 (age 58–59); Yuyao, Ningbo, Zhejiang Province
- Citizenship: China
- Education: Zhejiang University(Mathematics)
- Alma mater: Zhejiang University
- Occupations: computer programmer, entrepreneur
- Awards: National Senior Engineer title, by the Chinese Academy of Sciences, The Young Scientist Award, by the Chinese Academy of Science

Bao Yueqiao (simplified Chinese: 鲍岳桥; traditional Chinese: 鮑岳橋; pinyin: Bào Yuèqiáo), a distinguished computer programmer, entrepreneur, and go player. He is the co-founder and current president of Beijing OurGame Computer Technology Company Limited.

== Biography ==
Born in 1967 in Yuyao, Ningbo, Zhejiang Province, he graduated from the Mathematics Department of Zhejiang University in 1989.

After graduation, he worked during 1989-1993 as a computer programmer in the Computer Control Center, Hangzhou Rubber Factory, a state-owned enterprise.

He then went to Beijing, became the chief engineer in Beijing Hope Computer Company (BHCC), and served there in 1993-1998. During this period of time, he also kept his programming work in the Soft Department in the same company, and developed the PTDOS and UCDOS Chinese systems.

In 1998, he left BHCC, and founded Beijing OurGame Computer Technology Company with Jian Jin. He currently holds the president position of the company. Before January 2007, he was also the CEO of the company.

Bao further developed Beijing Globallink Computer Technology Co., Ltd.(BGCTC) and OurGame currently is a branch of BGCTC and the largest online game website or platform in China. According to a survey, it's possibly also the world's largest online game platform, mainly due to its 80 million enrolled players, 1 million formal members and half million online at the same time in the beginning of 2003.

== Honors and awards ==
- National Senior Engineer title, by the Chinese Academy of Sciences
- The Young Scientist Award, by the Chinese Academy of Science
- Top 10 IT persons in 2001 in China
