= Shao Piaoping =

Qing dynasty journalist

Shao Piaoping

Shao Piaoping (Chinese: 邵飄萍; pinyin: Shào Piāopíng) (11 October 1884 – 1926) was a journalist, author, and political activist in China during the early 20th century. He was originally named Jingqing (鏡清), and later renamed himself Zhenqing (振青).

Born in Jinhua (金華) in the province of Zhejiang (浙江), China, Shao spent most of his life pursuing his aspirations for journalism. "To die as a journalist" was his lifetime motto. Shao contributed to the development of journalism in China through efforts such as founding the influential newspaper Jing Bao (京報). He also mixed politics with his journalistic career by engaging in criticism against the government, which placed him in jail several times and eventually led to his death.

== Chronology ==
- 1884: born in Jinhua city, Zhejiang province
- 1903: began his secondary study in Zhejiang High School. Shao's interest in journalism was enlightened by Zhang Gong, the founder of the Chinese newspaper Cuixinbao (萃新報).
- 1906: entered Zhejiang Advanced College (浙江高等学堂, now Zhejiang University) in Hangzhou
- 1909: launched his first newspaper, called Yi Ri Bao (一日報), with a friend while in school
- 1911: became the chief editor of Hanmin Daily (漢民日報)
- 1913: arrested three times by ruling warlords and later fled to Japan
- 1916: established the Tokyo Editing Society (東京編譯社) and became the reporter for Shenbao in Tokyo
- 1918: set up the first Chinese News Editing Society in Beijing which aimed at self-editing local news and self-translating foreign news
- 1918: published Jing Bao (京報), the first newspaper in China with an independent background
- 1918: set up The Journalism Study Society of Beijing University (北京大學新聞研究會) for teaching new journalism concepts to students
- 1919: was arrested by the An Xin Government and fled to Japan again. Meanwhile, Jing Bao was put under suspension.
- 1920: relaunched Jing Bao
- 1925: advocated and supported the anti-warlordism revolution held by Feng Yu Xiang (馮玉祥) and Guo Song Ling (郭松齡) through Jing Bao
- 1926: was executed by Zhang Zuolin (張作霖) in Beijing for being accused of "promoting communism, colluding with Russia"

== Biography ==
=== Early life and education ===
Shao studied at Zhejiang High School in Hangzhou (杭州) and graduated in 1902. After his graduation, he went back to Jinhua and taught at the Jinhua No. 1 High School of Zhejiang. At that time, he started writing articles for several newspapers in Shanghai. In 1912, Shao established Hanmin Daily ( 漢民日報) with Han Sin Jai in Hangzhou. Following the Xinhai Revolution (1911), in 1913 he was arrested and sent to jail, being charged with "accusing the government with bad intention" because of his opposition to president Yuan Shikai (袁世凱). In the spring of 1914, he was rescued from the prison and fled to Japan. It was in Japan where he wrote large numbers of journal articles and critiques for two Chinese papers: Shenbao (申報) and Current Issues in Xinbao (時事新報; Si Shi Xinbao).

=== Career ===
In 1916, Shao returned to China and was soon appointed as the first Beijing correspondent of Shenbao, the oldest Shanghai newspaper with the largest circulation at that time. During his time in Beijing, Shao was impressed by the emergence of the New Culture Movement (新文化運動).

As the movement launched, Shao widely spread the idea of patriotism and democracy while promoting journalism in a revolutionary way. He established the News Editing Society (新聞編譯社), which was the first Editing Society established in China, and published the Beijing Special Notice(北京特別通訊), which contained more than 200 articles. His works facilitated the improvement of Chinese newspapers.

In 1918, Shao established a very influential paper in northern China called Jing Bao. However, it was put under suspension in 1919 because the official government was offended by its critiques. It was relaunched in 1920 with the support of Shao's wife. Yet, due to Jing Bao's stance against the warlord government, Shao was charged with "promoting communism, colluding with Russia", according to the decision of warlord Zhang Zuolin (張作霖).

=== Death ===
Shao was detested by contemporary warlord government since he constantly offended the officials. On 26 April 1926, Shao was arrested by military officials and executed in Beijing at his age of 40. In memory of him, the Memorial Hall was built in Hengdian Town of Dongyang City, 5 kilometers from Zixi Village, the birthplace of Shao.

== Contribution to journalism ==
Shao Piaoping was a pioneer of journalism during the early 20th century in China. His major contributions included: reforming the style and practice of newspaper, combating censorship, and laying out the guidelines for journalists.

=== Newspaper reform ===
Shao observed that there were numerous problems with the newspapers in his time. The first and most prominent problem was a biased viewpoint caused by limited sources and pressure from authorities. During the years 1910–1925 in particular, many Chinese newspapers fell under the influence of different parties. For instance, Beijing Shi Bao (北京時報) was controlled by Duan Qirui (段祺瑞), a powerful warlord; Huang Bao, on the other hand, was under the control of Zhang Zongchang (張宗昌), another warlord; and Chen Bao was under the direct control of Yan Jiu Xi, yet another warlord. Additionally, Shun Tian Shi Bao was run by the Japanese. In view of this, Shao advocated that journalists should report truthfully and practice the discipline of verification. He put this principle into practice when working for Shenbao.

Another problem of news organizations in China, especially in the 1910s, was the heavy dependence on foreign news agencies. Shao found this practice a barrier to the development of Chinese journalism because when journalists only copied the news scripts offered by foreign organizations, they failed to produce news on their own through self-exploration of the truth. Thus, in 1917, Shao requested local reporters working for Shenbao to increase the length of their texts from 200 words per article to 500. He also enlarged the coverage of news to include local news, foreign news, and domestic and foreign government policies and critiques.

=== Combating censorship ===
In the 1910s, when China was under the repressive rule of warlords, freedom of speech was suppressed and newspapers were under strict censorship. Despite this, Shao insisted on reporting political and military news on Shenbao, at a time when most journalists were confined to reporting on non-political and non-military issues. Although the government was occasionally offended by Shao's daring practice, he managed to reveal the down-to-earth truth to the public with the help of his keen social skills and wide interpersonal network with officials.

Shao's actions demonstrated that democratic and free journalism can be a powerful weapon against a repressive government. This increased the public's appreciation that freedom of speech and publication would not be granted by the government unless they fought for it. Journalists were also inspired, and guidance was provided on combating censorship.

=== Journalism guidelines ===
Summarized from the books, articles, and speeches by Shao, he believed that in order to be a good journalist, one should:

1. be aware of the current affairs.
2. be able to analyze and understand the background of news.
3. emphasize the ability to judge the value of news, and the complex and changing situation.
4. have the courage to stand against any pressure from authorities (e.g. the warlords).
5. be aware of the fact that one is influential to society and has the power to change it through reporting the news.
6. stay in close touch with different social classes in order to have a comprehensive understanding of the society and the different needs of the readers.
7. have common sense.
8. keep the news comprehensive, that is to be able to choose the news of the highest value, from the most appropriate time and of the most interest to the readers.
9. be observant, analytical, and imaginative.
10. be communicative and organized in news writing to ensure that the news is understandable, systematic, comprehensive, and persuasive.

=== Jing Bao ===
The newspaper Jing Bao (Chinese: 京報; pinyin: Jīng Bào; lit. 'Beijing Press') was set up in October 1918 with two main objectives: (1) to provide an independent platform for the public to express their opinions, and (2) to act against the malpractices of contemporary journalism, such as reporting faulty and biased news. When Jing Bao was first launched, Shao wrote the famous slogan "Tie Jian La Shou" (Chinese: 鐡肩辣手; lit. 'iron shoulders and critical hands') meaning that it is the newspaper's responsibility to criticize whatever injustice exists in society. He hoped to remind himself and his co-workers to retain the essence of journalism, namely a critical manner and objectivity.

In its early stages, Jing Bao mainly reported news concerning social issues, the economy, finance, diplomacy, education, art, and literature. In addition, it acted as a means to deliver notice from the government. In its later stage, it also focused on political and military news, Sino-foreign relationships, and culture. With its revolutionary way of reporting and its diverse coverage, Jing Bao became a popular newspaper at that time in Beijing.

In order to enrich the contents of the paper, supplementary papers including Xiao Jing Bao (小京報; 'Little Jing Bao') and Jing Bao Supplementary Paper (京報副刊) were added. Famous writers such as Lu Xun (魯迅) and Sun Fu Yuan (孫伏園) also wrote for the supplementary papers.

Jing Bao Supplementary Paper included different topics including social science, economy, literature, science, and religion. It emphasized the freedom of speech and encouraged people, particularly young writers, to express their opinions. This laid the foundation for the establishment of The Journalism Study Society of Beijing University (北京大學新聞研討會).

== Contribution to journalism education ==
=== Establishment of The Journalism Study Society of Beijing University (北京大學新聞研究會) ===
As a supporter of the study of journalism in China, Shao joined the Journalism Study Society at the University of Beijing in 1918. The society recruited 113 students, among them the later famous political leader Mao Zedong (毛澤東).

Shao introduced the western model of journalism and shared his experience as a journalist with the students. He kept reminding his students that morality—particularly in terms of helping the poor and undermining the power of the despots—was the most crucial element for journalists. He also made it clear to his students that journalists should verify the authenticity of news and be truthful to the readers. He told his students about the need to observe, apply logical thinking and imagination, and to judge the value of news. At the same time, he taught his students the basic concepts of journalism, including techniques of interviewing, truthfulness of news, the timing of news-reporting, and even the importance to a journalist of his appearance, language, and attitude.

Shao also arranged visits to news agencies for his students in order to have a taste of the real world. The students were encouraged to submit writings to newspapers. As a result, the Journalism Study Society, with the organized training of young journalists, generated a group of intellectuals who later became the pillar of modern journalism in China.

=== Books and writings on journalism ===
During the first two years when Shao worked as the Beijing correspondent of Shenbao, he wrote 251 articles with more than 220,000 words. In 1923, he published the books Practical Applied Journalism (實際應用新聞學) and The Journalism Pandect (新聞學總論), which focused on the discipline of journalism and promoted social justice and political renewal. In 1917, he published a famous article entitled "The hostile relation between the World and my country" (我國與世界戰局) in Shenbao. The article revealed the relationships among nations during the First World War and gave the Chinese a clearer picture of what was happening in the world. His other famous writings include, the "General studies of Sociological Ideologies in other countries" (綜合研究各國社會思潮), "Studies of New Russia" (新俄國之研究), and the "Collection of Shao Piaoping's Articles" (邵飄萍新聞通訊選).

== Influence on literature ==
After Jing Bao was relaunched in 1920, Shao focused on writing supplementary papers which contained a variety of literary content. Xiao Jing Bao (小京報) was the first of them. Later, Shao cooperated with the famous universities in Beijing to publish more supplementary papers. In total there were more than 10 supplementary papers, including Film Weekly (戲劇周刊), Women Weekly (婦女周刊), Human Arts Weekly (民眾文藝周刊), Economics Bimonthly (經濟半月刊), and Social Science Bimonthly (社會科學半月刊). He even invited Lu Xun (魯迅) to write the famous paper "Mang Yuan" (莽原). The contents of these papers were of great diversity, including film review, art, culture, and literature. Freedom of speech in these supplementary papers was maintained and Shao claimed that the principles of these papers could differ from those of Jing Bao based on their different nature.

Inspired by Shao's efforts in expanding the coverage of newspapers to include literary contents, his students Zhang Youluan (張友鵉), Zhao Shaojun (周紹鈞), and Huang Jinqing (黃近青) established the Xingxing Literature Society (星星文學社) and published Literature Weekly (文學周刊).

== Political views ==
=== Objection to the government ===
While Shao was recognized as an outstanding journalist, politics was an inseparable ingredient in his journalistic career. Shao foresaw Yuan Shikai's aggression to set up his own regime and thus launched the anti-Yuan force in China. His open objection to the new power naturally put him in trouble. Shao was arrested twice and his newspaper Hanmin Daily was forced to close down. He fled to Japan to continue working in the field of journalism. He was the earliest to unveil Yuan's conspiracy in accepting the infamous Twenty-One Demands proposed by Imperial Japan. In December 1916, he flew back to China to join the protest against Yuan's coronation.

During the May Fourth Movement (五四運動) in 1919, Shao took part in rallying for the support of Chinese students to save the country from Japanese aggression. He spoke at the University of Beijing on the reasons for China's frustration at the Paris Peace Conference and criticized the weaknesses of the Chinese Government in Jing Bao. This again agitated the authorities and eventually the newspaper was put under suspension. After fleeing to Japan for refuge, he returned to China when Duan Qi Rui's (段祺瑞) government lost power in 1920.

In 1925, he became a secret member of the Chinese Communist Party where he made large numbers of reports on the communist movement. A year later, the Chinese military, under the command of Zhang Zuolin (張作霖), executed Shao without trial, claiming that he "propagandized communism".

=== Involvement in the Communist Party ===
When the operation of Jing Bao was restarted in 1920, Shao published an article entitled "Study of the New Russia" (新俄國之研究). His aims were to introduce the theory of Karl Marx to the Chinese people, and more importantly, to promote the way he believed that could save China, which was revolution. The article presented the theory of socialism, glorified the October Revolution in the Soviet Union in 1917, and promoted the success of Union of Soviet Socialists Republics (USSR). The article sowed the seeds of communism in the hearts of many Chinese. Later, in 1921, Shao joined the "Marxist theory Study Society" (馬克斯學說研究會). He strongly promoted communism while discouraging capitalism. In 1925, he joined the Chinese Communist Party (中國共產黨).
