= Sung Shee =

Taiwanese historian (1920-2007)

Sung Shee (Chinese: 宋晞; pinyin: Sòng Xī; Wade–Giles: Sung Hsi; Pe̍h-ōe-jī: Sòng Hi; 6 October 1920 – 22 March 2007) was a Taiwanese historian, geographer, educator and governmental official. Sung was the fourth President of the Chinese Culture University.

== Life ==
On 6 October 1920, Sung was born in Lishui, Zhejiang Province, China. He studied history and geography at Zhejiang University and obtained his bachelor's and master's degrees there. His master thesis discussed the relationship between merchants and scholar-bureaucrats, government in Song Dynasty. He also obtained a master's degree from the Department of History at Columbia University, with a dissertation on Chinese Labour in the Transvaal, 1904–1907 (1957). Sung obtained his Ph.D. from Chinese Culture University in June 1989. Sung also received an honorary doctor's degree from Korean Konkuk University.

Sung came to Taiwan together with Chang Ch'i-yun. He had a long career in governmental offices including the research institute of national defence. He was the director of the Department of History and then Institute of History, Chinese Culture University. He also was the fourth president of Chinese Culture University.

Sung was a famous historian especially in the field of Song Dynasty history.

On 22 March 2007, Sung died in Taipei, Taiwan, from a car accident.

== Works ==
Sung's studies mainly were in Chinese history especially Song Dynasty history. These include:

- 《宋史研究論叢》 (A Series of Studies on Song Dynasty History, Vol. 1 to 5)
- 《旅美論叢》 (Studies during the American Journey)
- 《中國史學論集》 (Collection of Studies of Chinese History)
- 《清末華工對南非屈蘭斯瓦爾金礦開採的貢獻》 (Contributions of Chinese Labors to South African Gold Mines in Late Qing Dynasty)
- 《中國現代史論叢》 (Collection of Studies of Modern Chinese History)
- 《華學研究論集》 (Collection of Studies of Sinology)
- 《宋代學術精神之探討》 (Discussion of the Academic Spirit in Song Dynasty)
