= Zhou Chengjian =

Chinese businessman

- 周成建
- Born: 1966 (age 59–60); Lishui, Zhejiang, PRC
- Education: Zhejiang University
- Occupations: Founder & President, Metersbonwe

Zhou Chengjian (Chinese: 周成建, born 1966), is a Chinese businessman.

== Biography ==
Zhou was born in Qingtian County of Lishui, Zhejiang Province. He was a tailor when young. Zhou started his own business in 1986 when he was twenty years old.

Zhou obtained an EMBA degree from Zhejiang University in Hangzhou. Zhou went to Wenzhou in 1990s, and founded the Metersbonwe Group after borrowing only 200,000 yuan (US$24,691). Metersbonwe now is a famous fashion brand, and the largest casualwear retail brand in China. Zhou is the President of Metersbonwe at present.

In 2016, it was announced that he was one of a number of Chinese businessmen that had mysteriously gone missing. A week later, news reported that he has returned to work.

== Wealth & philanthropy ==
In 2008, Zhou Chengjian and his family was estimated worthy US$ 1.9 billion by the Hurun Report magazine. His daughter also holds a major share of the Metersbonwe Group.

In 2014, Zhou was ranked No.892 in Hurun Report's Global Rich List 2014, with a wealth of US$1.9 billion, which is a quite rare case because in 2009 the world's economy is in recession and the most billionaires in the list suffered from wealth shrink, but Zhou still earned a dramatic increase.

The famous Hurun Report made a rank named 2005 China Philanthropy List, and Zhou was ranked No.36 due to his large donation to local education system. The Hurun Report in late 2008 also summarized that "Zhou storms up the rankings" in Shanghai.
