= Hu Jimin =

Chinese physicist

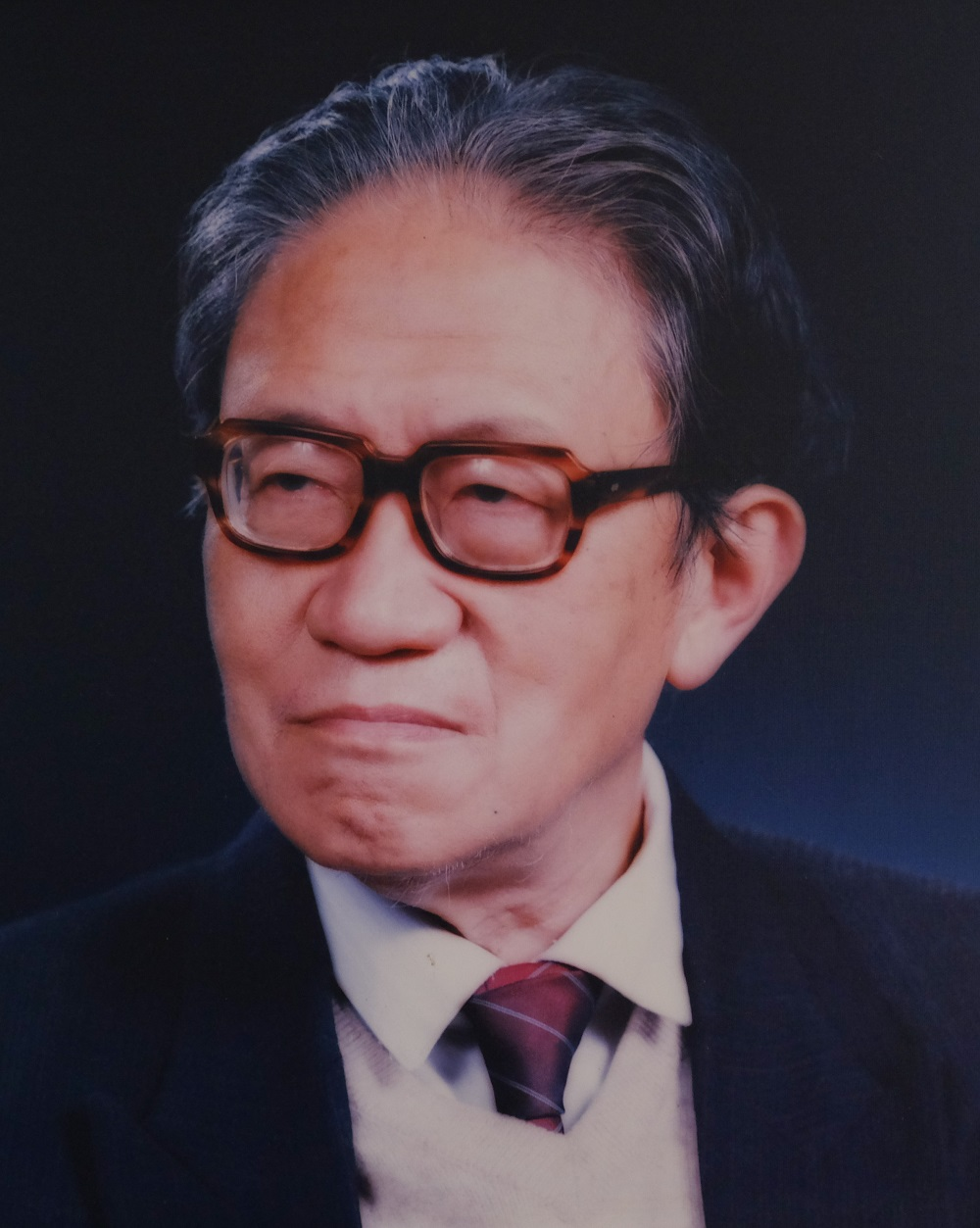
- Born: 26 January 1919; Jiangsu, China
- Died: 1998 (aged 78–79); Beijing, China
- Occupation: Nuclear Physicist
- Children: 4

Hu Jimin (traditional Chinese: 胡濟民; simplified Chinese: 胡济民; 1919–1998) was a Chinese nuclear physicist, plasma physicist and educator.

== Life and career ==
Hu was born on 26 January 1919 in Rugao, Nantong, Jiangsu Province. In 1935, Hu studied in Nantong High School. In 1937, Hu entered the Department of Chemistry of Zhejiang University in Hangzhou, Zhejiang Province. Hu soon transferred into the Department of Physics, and studied under Prof. Wang Ganchang and Hsin Pei Soh. Hu graduated in 1942, and became a teaching assistant in the department.

In 1945, aided by the British Council, Hu went to study in UK. At beginning, Hu studied at the University of Birmingham, under Mark Oliphant. Hu obtained PhD from the University College London (UCL) in 1948, and his advisor was Harrie Massey. Hu was a research assistant at UCL.

In 1949, Hu returned China and at beginning taught at Zhejiang University Department of Physics. In the spring of 1955, Hu was transferred to Beijing, to establish a research institute of atomic physics. In 1958, the institute was renamed as the Department of Technical Physics of Peking University, and Hu was its founding Chair, till 1986.

Hu was elected Academician of the Chinese Academy of Sciences (CAS) in 1980. Hu was former deputy director of CAS mathematics and physics division. Hu was former Director-general of the Chinese Society of Nuclear Physics (中国核物理学会), the former academic director of the National Laboratory of Heavy Ion Accelerator in Lanzhou (NLHIAL, 兰州重离子加速器国家实验室), and the former academic director of the Beijing National Tandem Accelerator Laboratory (北京串列加速器核物理国家实验室).
