= Yu Mao-Hong =

Chinese engineer

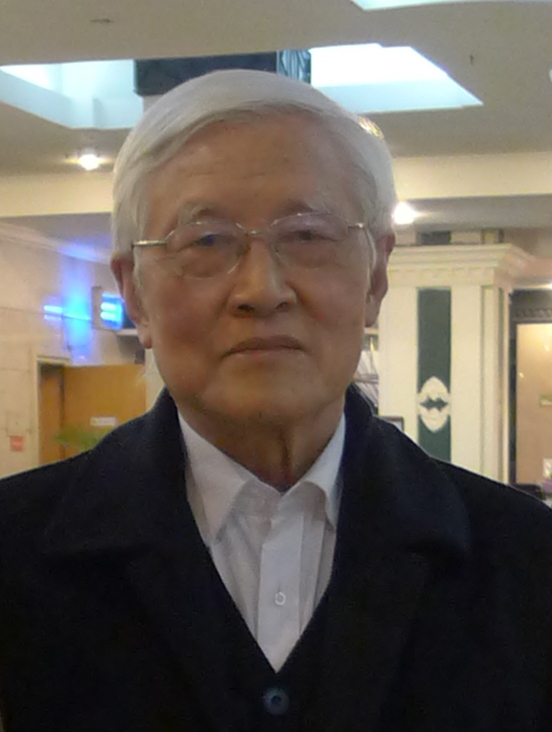
Yu Mao-Hong (2015)

Yu Mao-Hong (Chinese: 俞茂宏, b. 1934) is a Chinese engineer and a university professor. He is noted for his research on the strength criteria and yield surfaces of isotropic materials. His unified strength theory (UST) has found acceptance as generalized classical strength theory. It contains the following strength theories (hypotheses) and criteria as a function of the equivalent stress $\sigma_\mathrm{eq}=\sigma_+$ without any additional parameters:

- the normal stress theory (the William John Macquorn Rankine hypothesis),
- the Tresca yield criterion,
- the Sokolovsky regular dodecagon in the π-plane as approximation of the von Mises yield criterion, and
- the Schmidt-Ishlinsky yield criterion

and three one-parameter (in addition to the equivalent stress $\sigma_\mathrm{eq}$) criteria: the Mohr–Coulomb theory (Single-Shear-Theory (SST)), the Sdobyrev (Pisarenko-Lebedev) criterion, and the Twin-Shear-Theory (TST). The Unified Yield Criterion (UYC) as a part of the UST is used in the theory of plasticity (physics).

== Curriculum vitae ==
- 1951–1955 student at Zhejiang University, Hangzhou
- 1955–1959 assistant at Zhejiang University, Hangzhou
- 1960–1966 lecturer at Xi'an Jiaotong University, Xi'an
- 1978–1980 lecturer at Xi'an Jiaotong University, Xi'an
- 1981–1984 associate professor at Xi'an Jiaotong University, Xi'an
- 1985 till now professor at Xi'an Jiaotong University, Xi'an

== Selected books ==
- Introduction to Unified Strength Theory. Mao-Hong Yu, Shu-Qi Yu, CRC Press, London, 2019, ISBN 978-0-367-24682-2
- Unified Strength Theory and Its Applications, Second Edition. Mao-Hong Yu, Springer, Singapore, 2017, ISBN 978-981-10-6246-9, ISBN 978-981-10-6247-6
- Computational Plasticity: With Emphasis on the Application of the Unified Strength Theory (Advanced Topics in Science and Technology in China). Mao-Hong Yu, Jian-Chun Li, Springer, Berlin, 2012, ISBN 978-3-642-24589-3
- Generalized Plasticity. Mao-Hong Yu, Guo-Wei Ma, Hong-Fu Qiang, Yong-Qiang Zhang, Springer, Berlin, 2010, ISBN 978-3642064203
- Structural Plasticity: Limit, Shakedown and Dynamic Plastic Analyses of Structures (Advanced Topics in Science and Technology in China). Mao-Hong Yu, Guo-Wei Ma, Jian-Chun Li, Springer, Berlin, 2009, ISBN 978-3-540-88151-3
- Generalized Plasticity. Mao-Hong Yu, Guo-Wei Ma, Hong-Fu Qiang, Yong-Qiang Zhang, Springer, Berlin, 2006, ISBN 3-540-25127-8; 978-3-540-25127-9
- Unified Strength Theory and Its Applications. Mao-Hong Yu, Springer, Berlin, 2004, ISBN 3-540-43721-5
- Computational Plasticity (in Chinese). Mao-Hong Yu, Li Jian Chun, Springer, Berlin, 2000
- Engineering Strength Theory (in Chinese). Mao-Hong Yu, Higher Education Pressress, Beijing, 1999
- Researches on the Twin Shear Stress Strength Theory (in Chinese). Mao-Hong Yu, Xi'an Jiaotong University Press, Xi'an, 1988

== Selected articles ==
- General behaviour of isotropic yield function (in Chinese: 各向同性屈服函数的一般性貭 - 俞茂鋐. Mao-Hong Yu, Scientific and Technological Research Paper of Xi'an Jiaotong University, Xi'an, 1961, pp. 1–11
- Brittle fracture and plastic yield criterion (in Chinese: 各向同性屈服函数的一般性貭 (双切屈服准則及其流动規律). Mao-Hong Yu, Scientific and Technological Research Paper of Xi'an Jiaotong University, Xi'an, 1962, pp. 1–25
- Twin shear stress yield criterion. Mao-Hong Yu, Int. J. Mech. Sci., 1(25), 1983, pp. 71–74
- Advances in strength theories for materials under complex stress state in the 20th century. Mao-Hong Yu, Applied Mechanics Reviews, 5(55), 2002, pp. 169–218
- Linear and non-linear Unified Strength Theory (in Chinese). Mao-Hong Yu, Journal of Geotechnical Engineering, 4(26), 2007, pp. 662–669
- Basic characteristics and development of yield criteria for geomaterials. Mao-Hong Yu, Xia, G., Kolupaev, V. A., Journal of Rock Mechanics and Geotechnical Engineering, 1(1), 2009, pp. 71–88, doi:10.3724/SP.J.1235.2009.00071
- Unified Strength Theory (UST). Mao-Hong Yu, Rock Mechanics and Engineering, Volume 1: Principles, Editor: Xia-Ting Feng, pp. 425–450, CRC Press, London, 2017, ISBN 1138027596

== Awards ==
- 2011: National Natural Science Award, China
- 2014: Excellent Article Award, Journal of Rock mechanics and Geotechnical Engineering
- 2015: Ho Leung Ho Lee Foundation Price, China
