= Empress Mingde =

Empress Mingde may refer to:

- Empress Ma (Han dynasty) (40–79), wife of Emperor Ming of Han
- Empress Qiang (died 356), wife of Former Qin's founding emperor Fu Jian
- Empress Mingde (Song dynasty) (960–1004), wife of Emperor Taizong of Song
- Lady Wulinda (died 1152), wife of Emperor Shizong of Jin before his coronation
