= Shi Yuzhu =

Chinese businessman

Shi Yuzhu 史玉柱
- Born: 1962 (age 63–64); Huaiyuan County, Anhui, China
- Education: Zhejiang University; Shenzhen University
- Occupations: Founder & President; Giant Interactive Group

Shi Yuzhu (Chinese: 史玉柱) is a Chinese entrepreneur and software engineer.

== Early life and education ==
Shi was born in 1962 in Huaiyuan County, Anhui, China. After he graduated from the Department of Mathematics at Zhejiang University, he did his postgraduate study in the Department of Software Engineering at Shenzhen University.

== Business career ==
Chairman of the Board and Chief Executive Officer of Giant Interactive Group, one of China's most successful online game companies. In October, licensed flagship game ZT Online to Astrum Nival of Russia. Founded the company in 2005. Took it public in the United States in November 2007. Got a bachelor's degree in mathematics from Zhejiang University, and created a huge following for his Zhuhai Giant Hi-Tech Group in 1991, based on the popularity of a single videogame. Zhuhai Giant collapsed under the weight of massive debt incurred for a 70-story skyscraper that was never built. His recent return to games through an online services provider he founded, ZTgame, has given new life to his entrepreneurial reputation. Shi also has more than 3% stakes in Minsheng Bank, of which he's a director, and Huaxia Bank. Diversifying into Chinese rice wine market.

== Giant Interactive Group ==
Giant Interactive Group is an online game developer and operator in China. The Company focuses on massively multiplayer online (MMO) games that are played through networked game servers, in which a number of players are able to simultaneously connect and interact. The Company's three MMO games include ZT Online, ZT Online PTP, a pay-to-play game based on the ZT Online free-to-play game, and Giant Online. ZT Online, ZT Online PTP, ZT Online Green, ZT Online Classic Edition and Giant Online together had 1,572,000 quarterly peak concurrent users and 474,000 quarterly average concurrent users during the year ended December 31, 2009. In addition, it launched two free-to-play games, ZT Online Green and My Sweetie, and introduced King of Kings III, or K III, XT Online and The Golden Land in 2009. In December 2009, and January 2010, the Company acquired two licenses to operate Elsword and Allods Online, two three dimensional-MMO games, in mainland China.

== Wealth ==
In 2010's, Forbes World's Billionaires List, Shi was ranked no. 616 in the world.

In terms of Asia, Shi is ranking at number 49 in the richest people in China, according to the Forbes 2015 rich list. His estimated worth is 3.15 billion US dollars.
