= Xiaoming Liu =

Chinese-American computer scientist

- Born: China
- Occupations: Computer scientist and academic

Academic background
- Education: B.A., Computer Science and Engineering; M.S., Computer Science and Engineering; Ph.D., Electrical and Computer Engineering
- Alma mater: Beijing Information Technology Institute; Zhejiang University; Carnegie Mellon University

Academic work
- Institutions: Michigan State University

Xiaoming Liu is a Chinese-American computer scientist and an academic. He is a professor in the Department of Computer Science and Engineering, MSU Foundation Professor as well as the Anil K. and Nandita Jain Endowed Professor of Engineering at Michigan State University.

Liu is most known for his works in the fields of computer vision, machine learning, and biometrics, with a particular focus on facial analysis and three-dimensional (3D) vision. Moreover, he is the recipient of the 2018 and 2023 Withrow Distinguished Scholar Award from the Michigan State University College of Engineering.

Liu is a fellow of the International Association for Pattern Recognition (IAPR) and The Institute of Electrical and Electronics Engineers (IEEE). Additionally, he is the associate editor of the journal IEEE Transactions on Pattern Analysis and Machine Intelligence.

== Education ==
Liu completed his Bachelor of Arts degree in Computer Science and Engineering from Beijing Information Technology Institute in 1997. In 2000, he obtained a Master of Science degree in Computer Science and Engineering from Zhejiang University under the supervision of Yueting Zhuang. This was followed by a Ph.D. in Electrical and Computer Engineering, supervised by Tsuhan Chen and Vijayakumar Bhagavatula from Carnegie Mellon University in 2004.

== Career ==
Liu began his academic career in 1998 by joining the Intelligent CAD Lab at Zhejiang University as a research assistant and served until 1999. Between 2000 and 2004, he worked at the Advanced Multimedia Processing Lab at Carnegie Mellon University as a research assistant. In 2012, Liu joined Michigan State University, where he assumed various academic roles over the years. He began as an assistant professor in the Department of Computer Science and Engineering, a position he held from 2012 to 2018, and subsequently became an associate professor in the same department from 2018 to 2020. Since 2020, he has been serving as a professor in the Department of Computer Science and Engineering at Michigan State University. Additionally, he holds appointments as an MSU Foundation Professor since 2021 and as the Anil K. and Nandita Jain Endowed Professor of Engineering at Michigan State University since 2022.

From 2004 to 2012, Liu worked as a computer scientist at the Visualization & Computer Vision Lab at GE Global Research. Since 2021, he has held the role of visiting researcher scientist as part of Google's visiting researcher program. He has also been serving as an associate editor for the Journal IEEE Transactions on Pattern Analysis and Machine Intelligence since 2023. He has served as associate editor for the journal of Neurocomputing, Pattern Recognition Letters, Pattern Recognition, and IEEE Transaction on Image Processing.

== Research ==
With an h-index of 71 and a citation count of 23,105, he has authored over 200 publications spanning the field of computer vision, with a primary focus on recognition, modeling, and 3D perception.

=== Recognition ===
The recognition and analysis of human facial images have been a central focus in the field of computer vision since its inception. Liu's recognition research has focused on fundamental problems such as designing effective loss functions for face matcher learning, integrating identity information across frames, exploring the link between image restoration and recognition in low-quality imagery, and investigating the role of 2D and 3D shapes in recognition. His group designed a margin-based loss function that is adaptive to the diverse image quality in face recognition training dataset, which resulted in a generic face matcher called Adaface. Concentrating his research efforts on tackling video-based face recognition, his study underscored the contribution of temporal dynamics in recognition and introduced an adaptable method called "CAFace" for understanding the connections between identity details across video frames and executing sequential recognition while streaming video.

One of the primary research objectives of Liu's recognition research is to cultivate trust between AI systems and their users. He led research in face presentation attack detection (PAD) and published papers. He created algorithms to mitigate bias in facial recognition by revealing that different demographic groups require distinct convolutional neural network (CNN) kernels, leading to an adaptive architecture that enhances accuracy while reducing bias. Moreover, he proposed a technique Model Parsing for reverse engineering GMs to understand their hyperparameters. His group also developed passive and proactive approaches to deep fake detection and localization.

=== Modeling ===
Liu's modeling research has centered on image alignment and intrinsic image decomposition. He developed Boosted Appearance Model, a discriminative model for image alignment that uses a boosting-based classifier to distinguish between correctly aligned images with ground-truth landmarks and incorrectly aligned images with perturbed landmarks. Additionally, to address the limitations of BAM, he introduced BRM, which focused on learning a score function that is concave in the vicinity of the correct alignment, potentially improving alignment accuracy. Furthermore, he identified the challenge of aligning profile-view faces accurately and addressed this by developing approaches that treat image alignment as a 3D Morphable Models (3DMM) fitting problem, enabling the estimation of 3D facial landmarks.

Liu's intrinsic image decomposition research addressed the problem of 3D reconstruction from 2D images, aiming to estimate high-fidelity 3D surface information of objects or scenes. He proposed an approach based on intrinsic image decomposition, breaking down an image into four components: camera projection matrix, shape parameters, albedo parameters, and illumination parameters, achieved through an encoder. Notably, the absence of ground truth labels for training the encoder leads them to employ two decoders, one for generating 3D shape and another for albedo maps. He used a differentiable renderer to jointly learn the encoder and decoders, ensuring that the rendered image closely matches the original input. Initially developed for faces, this framework serves as a deformable appearance and shape model, akin to the conventional 3D Morphable Model (3DMM) but capable of learning directly from 2D in-the-wild images without the need for 3D scans. Moreover, it was extended to generic objects through the development of implicit functions.

=== 3D perception ===
Liu's 3D vision research has explored the fields of 3D object detection and multi-sensor fusion. He proposed a method, referred to as M3D-RPN (Monocular 3D Region Proposal Network) which enhanced the effectiveness of monocular 3D object detection and Bird's Eye View tasks when applied to the KITTI urban autonomous driving dataset. This research was further extended in the direction of video-based detection, the creation of depth equivariant networks and non-maximum suppression (NMS) techniques. Moreover, he specialized in the field of multi-sensor fusion, focusing on integrating cameras with LiDAR or Radar sensors to enhance 3D perception capabilities. His work encompassed tasks like depth completion, velocity estimation, and 3D object detection.

== Awards and honors ==
- 2018 – Withrow Distinguished Scholar–Junior Award
- 2020 – Fellow, International Association for Pattern Recognition
- 2021 – MSU Foundation Professor, Michigan State University
- 2022 – Fellow, Institute of Electrical and Electronics Engineers
- 2022 – Anil K. and Nandita Jain Endowed Professor of Engineering, Michigan State University
- 2023 – Withrow Distinguished Scholar–Senior Award

== Selected articles ==
- Zhu, X., Lei, Z., Liu, X., Shi, H., & Li, S. Z. (2016). Face alignment across large poses: A 3D solution. In Proceedings of the IEEE conference on computer vision and pattern recognition (pp. 146–155).
- Tai, Y., Yang, J., & Liu, X. (2017). Image super-resolution via deep recursive residual network. In Proceedings of the IEEE conference on computer vision and pattern recognition (pp. 3147–3155).
- Tai, Y., Yang, J., Liu, X., & Xu, C. (2017). MemNnet: A persistent memory network for image restoration. In Proceedings of the IEEE international conference on computer vision (pp. 4539–4547).
- Tran, L., Yin, X., & Liu, X. (2017). Disentangled representation learning GAN for pose-invariant face recognition. In Proceedings of the IEEE conference on computer vision and pattern recognition (pp. 1415–1424)
- Liu, Y., Jourabloo, A., & Liu, X. (2018). Learning deep models for face anti-spoofing: Binary or auxiliary supervision. In Proceedings of the IEEE conference on computer vision and pattern recognition (pp. 389–398).
