= Chen Mingde =

Chinese politician

Chen Mingde (Traditional Chinese: 陳明德, Simplified Chinese: 陈明德; born 1940), is a Chinese politician. He is former general secretary and vice-president of the China Democratic National Construction Association (CNDCA).

== Career ==
Chen was born in June 1940 in Ningbo, Zhejiang Province, and graduated from the Department of Electrical Engineering, Zhejiang University in 1962.

Chen served in the Institute of Electrotechnics, Chinese Academy of Sciences for a long time. He was a technician, researcher and the chairman of the employee committee at the institute. From 1981 to 1983, he studied and worked in United States (State University of New York Institute of Technology) as a visiting scholar.

In June 1986 Chen became a member of the China Democratic National Construction Association (CNDCA), and was elected as central member in February 1987. That May, he was pointed to be the deputy secretary-general of CNDCA Beijing. In 1988, he was promoted to be the chairperson of the CNDCA Beijing, and became a member of the Chinese People's Political Consultative Conference (CPPCC) Beijing Branch. In 1993, Chen became the general secretary and vice-chairperson of CNDCA Beijing. From May 1994 - December 1997, Chen also served in the Beijing government and was in charge of economy (industry) and development. In November 1997, he became the general secretary of CNDCA and started directing its daily work. In 1998, he was elected to be the deputy secretary-general and standing member of CPPCC. Since 2002, he is the vice-president of CNDCA.
