= Myungduk Foreign Language High School =

Coordinates: 37°33′14″N 126°49′59″E

Myung Duk Foreign Language High School
- Hangeul: 명덕외국어고등학교; Hanja: 明德外國語高等學校; Russian: Спец-школа Иностранных Языков Мёндок; French: Le lycée de langues étrangères de Myungduk German: Myungduk-Fremdsprachenoberschule
- Seoul; Korea, Republic of

Information
- Type: Private
- Motto: 높은 이상을 갖자 그리고 성실 근면하자; Let Us Follow High Ideals and with Sincerity, Labor Diligently
- Established: 1992
- Principal: Jae Yong Kang (강재용), 2011~
- Flower: Camellia
- Tree: Pine Tree
- Website: mdfh.or.kr

Myung Duk Foreign Language High School (Hangeul: 명덕외국어고등학교, Hanja: 明德外國語高等學校) is a foreign language high school located in the Gang-seo District of Seoul, Korea.

== History ==
The establishment of Myungduk Foreign Language High School was approved by the Ministry of Education on September 11, 1991. The main building for the school, Su Myung Kwan (Hangeul: 수명관), was dedicated on November 30, 1991. The school officially opened on March 5, 1992, to 500 students who were given admission. There were ten classes of language majors featuring 3 German, 3 French, 3 Japanese and 1 Russian. Today there are four English (sub-majoring 2 German and 2 French), 2 German, 2 French, 1 Japanese, 1 Russian and 2 Chinese major offerings. The total number of graduates since 1995 until the 15th graduation in 2009 was 7,447.

== Specialties of the School ==
Math field trip/Math conference, Track and Field day, Speech club, among others are currently held. The track and field day is held in May with classifications broken down for each grade. Soccer, basketball, volleyball, kickball, tennis are some of the various competitive events held. The speech club commences in September. The clubs are held autonomously by students and the conditions or standards for the groups are set according to desires and hobbies of the members. As of 2007 there were above 40 active clubs and as desired, even more new clubs may be formed by students. During the school break language champion students go on a foreign trip - during the summer break a Europe trip is held while the winter break features a trip for language champions to Japan and China. In 2008 the Europe trip has been discontinued, however new students entering in 2009 are scheduled to be able to participate until their second year. From 2007 the dress code of casual clothes has been discontinued and has been followed with the introduction of a school uniform. From 2009 however, students have been proposing a system that will allow for both kinds of systems as dictated by the dress code.

== Majors ==
=== English ===
The English department fosters the advancement of its students' abilities in understanding and using English, so that they may utilize English to its most active and fullest extent in their respective fields of study and future careers, and so that they are equipped to adeptly introduce Korean culture. Students in the English department attend classes in English Reading, English Speaking, English Writing, English Reading, English Grammar, and Culture in the English Speaking World. The first level classes in Reading, Speaking, Writing, and Listening are required, and the second-level classes, along with Grammar and Culture are up to the students' choices. The English department's high standard of lingual proficiency has led it to focus on an efficient curriculum, one that teaches English fluency through experience and activities. Thus, students are expected to distinguish media, informational, and cultural differences in topics or subjects that are introduced and interacted with in English. From the materials presented, students are to objectively extrapolate ideas, and thus form a substantive set of values. Through the study of English, the English department expands the students' capabilities in reasoning and problem solving skills, which ultimately instills a sense of self-sufficiency and creativity. The English majors learn French for the second language, whereas other language majors learn English. Throughout the school life, they learn most various languages - English, Korean, French and Chinese in their 3rd year.The English major has two classes(3,4).

=== German ===
The German major has 2 classes. (5,6)

=== French ===
The French major has 2 classes. (7,8)

=== Japanese ===
The Japanese major has only 1 class. (9)

=== Russian ===
The Russian major has 1 class. (10) They have same colleagues throughout the school life, just as Japanese major. They are very active, and have passion in learning Russian language.

=== Chinese ===
The Chinese major has 2 classes (1,2) and they have excellent Chinese language instructors.

== Global Education Program ==
The Global Education Program (GEP) is designed to meet the needs of students wishing to pursue college education overseas. The program's curriculum focuses on SAT, SAT II subject tests, TOEFL, AP classes and GPA. Extracurricular activities include internships, leadership programs, community service, and preparing for a future college-level major.
