= Chinese Culture University =

Private university in Taipei, Taiwan

- 中國文化大學
- Motto: 質樸堅毅 (pinyin: Zhìpǔ Jiān Yì; Pe̍h-ōe-jī: Chit-phok Kian-gē)
- Motto in English: Temperament, Simplicity, Strength, and Tenacity
- Type: Private
- Established: 1962
- Founders: Chang Ch'i-yun
- Affiliations: U12 Consortium, ACCBE, EPU
- President: Shing-Ching Shyu
- Administrative staff: 717 teachers (161 Professors; 266 Associate Professors; 195 Assistant Professors, 95 Lecturers)
- Students: 32,000
- Location: Shilin, Taipei, Taiwan; 25°08′N 121°32′E
- Campus: Suburban
- Website: www.pccu.edu.tw

Chinese name
- Traditional Chinese: 中國文化大學
- Simplified Chinese: 中国文化大学
Transcriptions
Standard Mandarin
- Hanyu Pinyin: Zhōngguó Wénhuà Dàxué
- Wade–Giles: Chung^{1}-kuo^{2} Wen^{2}-hua^{4} Ta^{4}-hsüeh^{2}
Southern Min
- Hokkien POJ: Tiong-kok Bûn-hòa Tāi-ha̍k

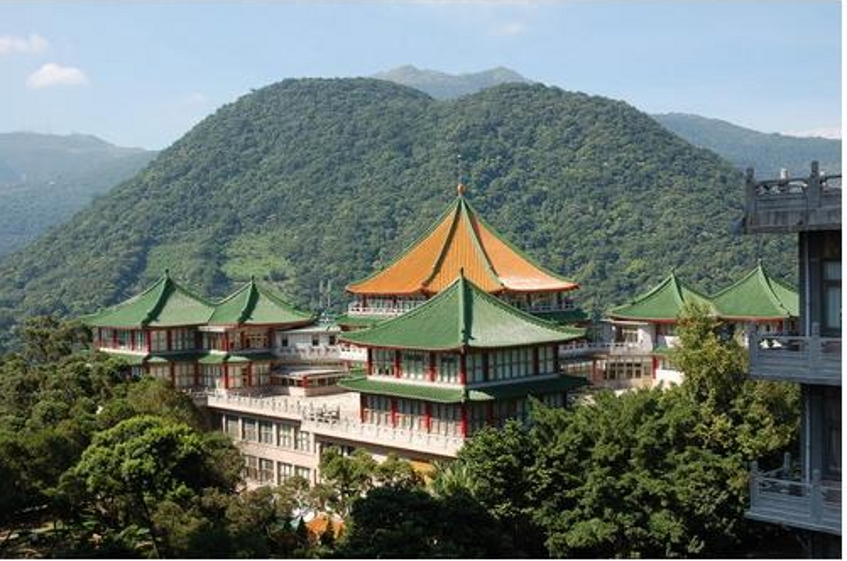
Campus Buildings, Chinese Culture University

Chinese Culture University (CCU; Chinese: 中國文化大學; pinyin: Zhōngguó Wénhuà Dàxué) is a private research university in Yangmingshan in Shilin District, Taipei, Taiwan. Established in 1962, the university is one of the largest universities in Taiwan with an enrollment of about 32,000 students. Satellite campuses are located in the Jianguo, Ximending, and Zhongxiao East Road areas of Taipei City.

== History ==
The school was founded as Far East University in 1962 by Chang Ch'i-yun, and it was renamed College of Chinese Culture by President Chiang Kai-shek in 1963. It became Chinese Culture University in 1980.

The main campus is located on Yang Ming Mountain, overlooks the Tienmu District, and is about a 45-minute drive from Taipei Main Station. The area is known for its extensive hiking trails and hot springs. The university is located just off of the main road that winds up the mountain where amenities can be found. Many of the students rent apartments in this small village area and the city buses have stops along the main road.

Chinese Culture University has been reorganized many times. The Ministry of Education granted the University permission to establish studies in philosophy, Chinese, Eastern languages, English, French, German, history, geography, news, art, music, drama, physical education, domestic science, and architecture.

== Academics ==
Chinese Culture University rankings

Global – Overall
- THE World: 1501+ (2024)

Regional – Overall
- QS Asia: 601–650 (2024)
- THE Asia: 601+ (2024)

National – Overall
- THE National: 35–45 (2024)

CCU has 12 colleges: Agriculture, Arts, Business Administration, Education, Engineering, Environmental Design, Foreign Languages, Journalism and Mass Communications, Law, Liberal Arts, Science, and Social Sciences. CCU first appeared and ranked 401-450 in the QS 2022 Asian Universities Ranking.

In 2023, CCU was ranked 16th best Taiwanese university focusing on humanities and social sciences by Global Views Monthly.

== Transportation ==
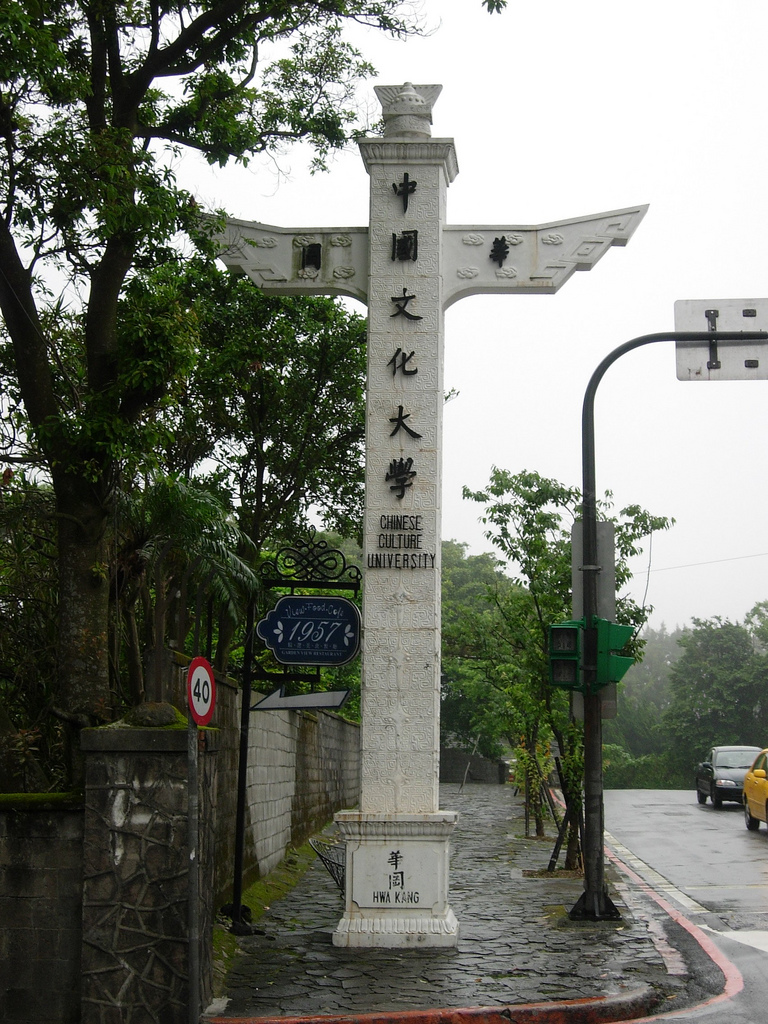
Traditional Chinese Huabiao at the Main Gate

The relatively inconvenient and isolated location of CCU's main campus has presented students and staff with transportation problems. While the university operates a number of school buses to transport faculty, staff and students up and down the mountain every day, many students chose to ride scooters up to the main campus. This has resulted in a high number of student injuries and fatalities each semester. Public buses, the R5 and 260, also operate between the main campus and downtown Taipei. These buses also make stops at Jiantan and Shilin MRT train stations. Taxi service can be found on the main campus with taxis waiting for students and teachers in front of the university sports centre during the daytime hours.

== Facilities ==
CCU has four campuses in Taipei City. The main campus is located on Yang Ming Mountain and three other smaller campuses are located in Jianguo, Ximending, and Zhongxiao East Road in downtown Taipei. The Jianguo campus is the location of the Mandarin Learning Center, while the Zhongxiao East Road campus is the location of the International Language Institute. The Ximending campus offers a variety of both credit and non-credit courses in addition to being an extension campus for the College of Law.

=== The Hwa Kang Museum ===
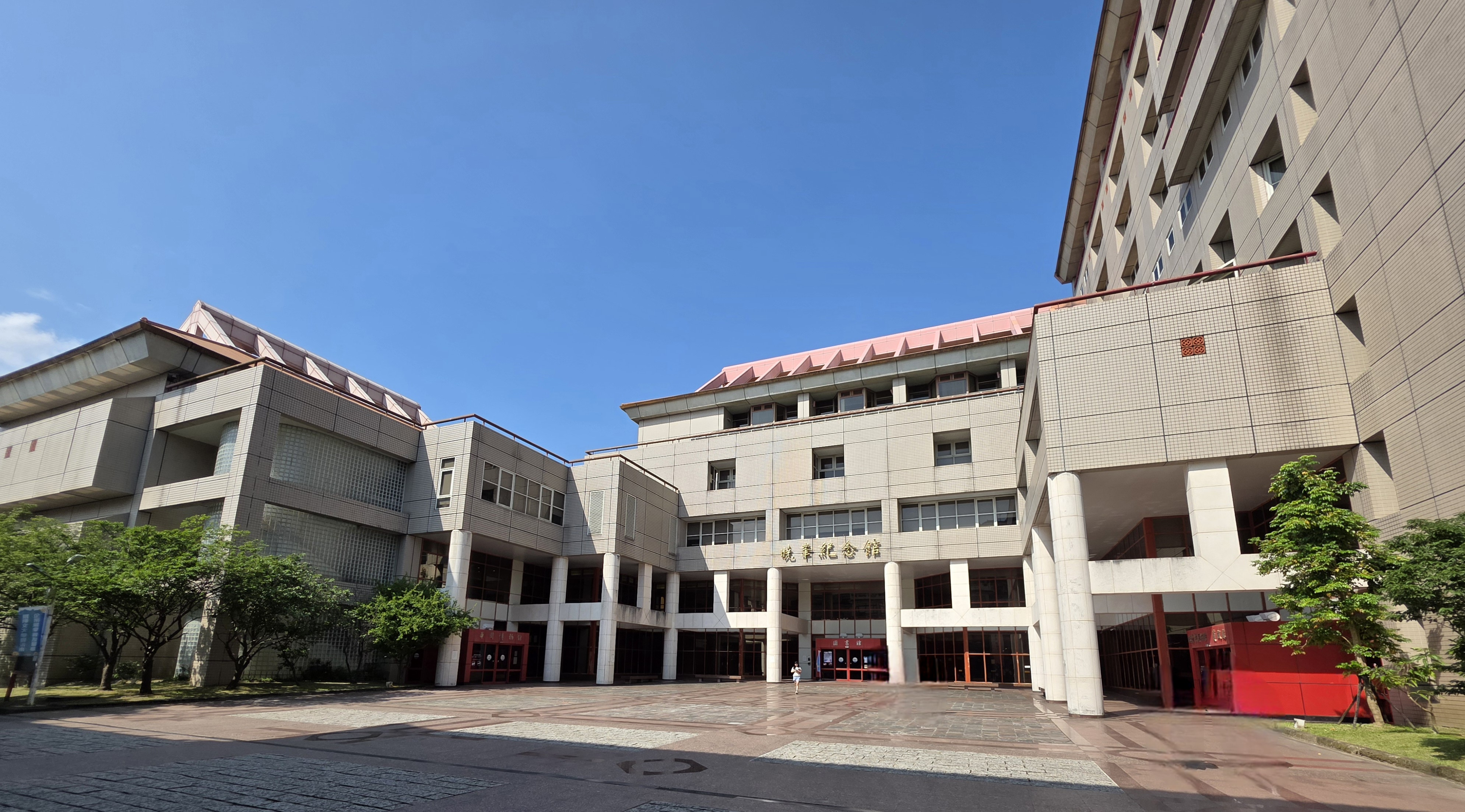
Hwa Kang Museum

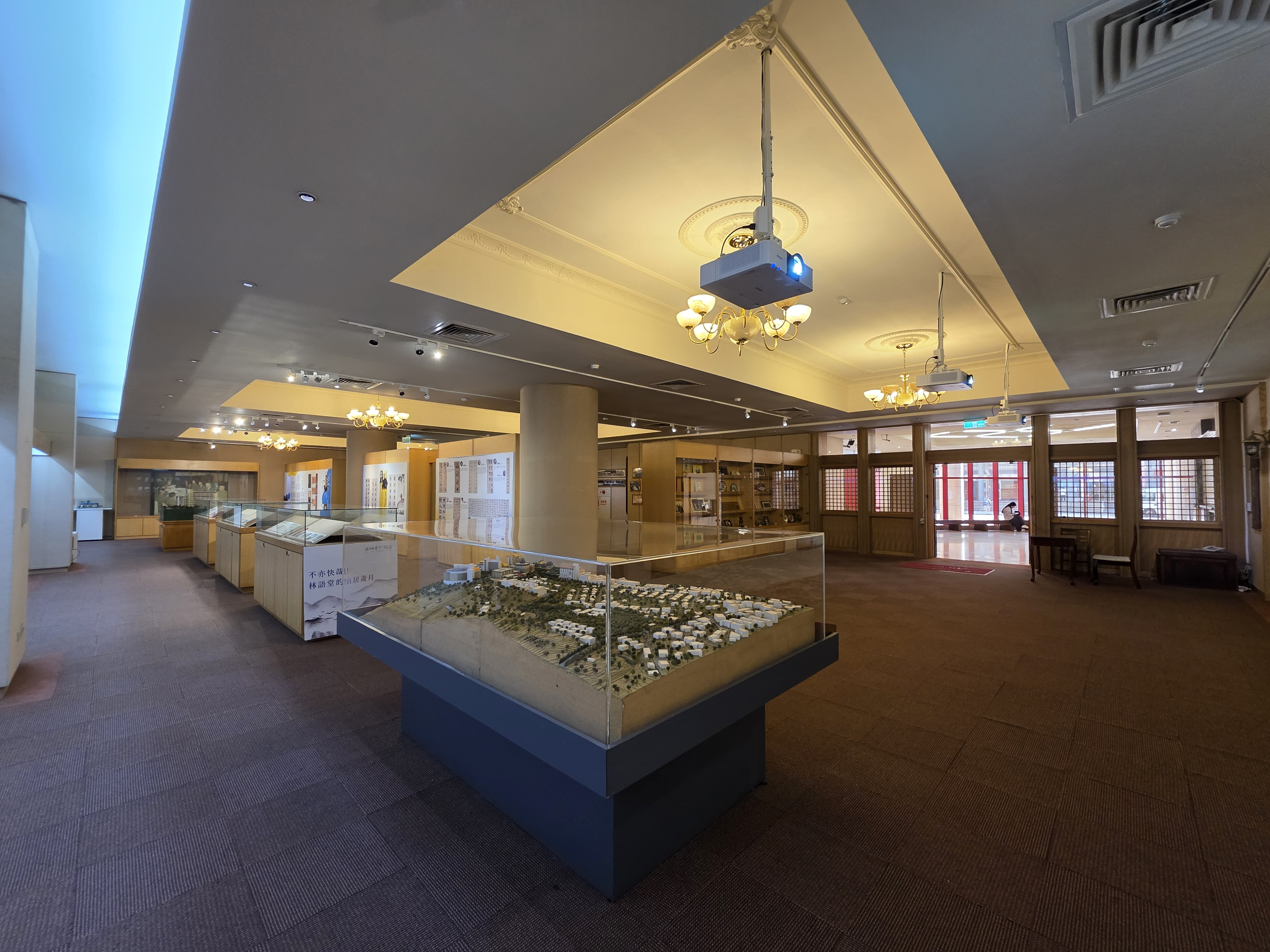
School History Room

Established in 1971, the university museum now located in the right wing of Xiao Feng Memorial Hall, also called the Hwa Kang Museum, is the first comprehensive museum of its kind in Taiwan. Its permanent collection consists of Chinese ceramics from the many centuries, modern Chinese paintings and calligraphic works, Chinese folk arts and woodblock prints. Some highlights of the collection include pieces by Wang Yangming, Wu Changshuo, Woo Tsin-hang, Yu Youren, Puru, Chang Dai-chien, and Li Meishu.

== Athletics ==
CCU offers martial arts programs on the Yang Ming Shan campus. The CCU Judo team is internationally competitive and a number of members have won their division in both national and international tournaments. The CCU Martial Arts Department also offers courses in Japanese ju jitsu, aikido and kung fu.

The CCU baseball program was established in 1964, in the second year of the school's history.

== People ==
=== Notable faculty ===
- Chang Chin-lan - first female justice of the Supreme Court of the Republic of China
- Ch'ien Mu - Chinese historian, educator, philosopher and Confucian considered one of the greatest historians and philosophers in 20th-century China
- Hu Lancheng - Chinese writer and editor
- Li Mei-shu - Artist, best known for the most recent reconstruction of Changfu Temple
- Mou Zongsan - Chinese New Confucian philosopher
- Nan Huai-Chin - Professor of Chan Buddhism
- Thomas Liao, Activist and founding director of the graduate school of chemical engineering
- Sung Shee - History professor
- Sanmao - Writer, Associate Professor in the Chinese Language Department
- Sheng-yen - Founder of the Dharma Drum Mountain
- John Ching Hsiung Wu - Chinese poet, lawyer, and writer

=== Notable alumni ===
- Aaron Yan, pop singer, actor, member of the boy band Fahrenheit (b. 1985)
- Hsu Tain-tsair, Mayor of Tainan City (2001-2010)
- Hung Hsiu-chu, Chairperson of Kuomintang (2016-2017)
- Iwan Nawi, Deputy Minister of Council of Indigenous Peoples
- Winnie Hsin, pop singer (b. 1962)
- Yang Cheng-wu, Magistrate of Kinmen County
- Li Ang, Taiwanese feminist writer and author of The Butcher's Wife (b. 1952)
- Tsai Ming-liang, Golden Lion Taiwanese film director
- Huang Chih-hsiung, Olympic medalist in Taekwondo
- Jimmy Liao, Taiwanese illustrator and picture book writer
- Frankie Kao, singer (1950-2014)
- Kingone Wang, actor and singer
- Jenny Tseng, Macau-born singer
- Richie Jen, singer and actor
- Wang Hsing-ching, journalist
- Tsao Chi-hung, Magistrate of Pingtung County (2005–2014)
- Pan Shih-wei, Minister of Ministry of Labor (2014)
- Liu Cheng-hung, Magistrate of Miaoli County (2005–2014)
- Hsu Ming-tsai, Mayor of Hsinchu City (2009–2014)
- Lin Yu-chang, Mayor of Keelung City
- Wu Tien-chang, artist
- Chao Liang-yen, member of the Legislative Yuan
- Chen Yin-ho, architect and member of the Legislative Yuan

== Gallery ==
Chinese Style Buildings, Chinese Culture University

Centre of Chinese Culture University Campus

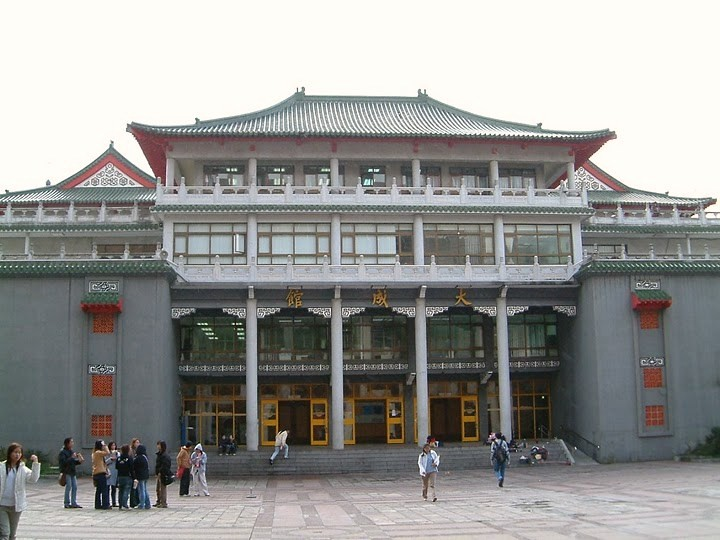
Classroom buildings

== See also ==
- List of universities in Taiwan
- Chinese Encyclopedia
- U12 Consortium
