= Qingdao University =

University in Qingdao, Shandong, China

Coordinates: 36.072°N 120.428°E

- 青岛大学
- Motto: 明德 博学 守正 出奇
- Motto in English: Morality Erudition Truth Innovation
- Type: Public
- Established: 1985; 41 years ago
- Affiliations: Plan 111, Key Provincial Universities
- President: Wei Zhiqiang (魏志强)
- Faculty: 3,842
- Students: 46,000
- Undergraduates: 35,000+
- Postgraduates: 9,800+
- Other students: 1,600 international students
- Location: Qingdao, Shandong, China
- Colors: Blue
- Nickname: 青大 (Qīng dà)
- Sporting affiliations: CUBA
- Mascot: Swan Geese (Anser)
- Website: Qingdao University

Chinese name
- Simplified Chinese: 青岛大学
- Traditional Chinese: 青島大學
Transcriptions
Standard Mandarin
- Hanyu Pinyin: Qīngdǎo Dàxué

Qingdao University (abbreviation: QDU/QDU Med school; Chinese: 青岛大学) is a key provincial research university located in Qingdao, Shandong, China.

The university was first established in 1985. In 1993, the former Qingdao University, Qingdao Medical College, Shandong Textile Engineering College, and Qingdao Normal College, merged to form the new Qingdao University. At present, QDU is one of the best comprehensive universities in Shandong Province, recognized as a member of the national "Excellent Engineer Education and Training Program."

With a strong profile in Medical Sciences, Textile and Design, Business, and liberal arts, QDU serves 35,000 full-time undergraduate students, 9,800 graduate students, and 1,600 international students.

== History ==
In 1985, Qingdao University was established, with the educational goal of "high level distinctive university," and disciplines of arts, science, engineering, business and many other subjects. School construction and development were supported financially by the central government, and also academically supported by Nankai University, Tianjin University, University of Science and Technology of China, and Shandong University. In 1993, Qingdao University merged Shandong Textile Engineering Institute (山东纺织工学院), Qingdao Medical College (青岛医学院) and Qingdao Normal College (青岛师范专科学校).

== Academics ==
=== Overview ===
Qingdao University consists of 25 faculties and departments as well as a graduate school. Courses are offered in 11 main Academic disciplines: Philosophy, Economics, Law, Literature, History, Natural sciences, Engineering, Management, Medicine, Education and Military sciences. There are 104 Undergraduate degree programs, 209 master's degree programs, 127 Doctoral degree programs, and 15 post-doctorate mobile stations. In addition, there are 7 professional master's degree programs in Law, Business Management, Engineering, Clinical Medicine, Public Health, Dentistry and Public Administration respectively.

=== National Rankings ===
In 2020:

- U.S. News & World Report = 78
- Wu Shulian = 87
- CRWU = 95
- ARWU = 108
- NSEAC = 101

=== Colleges and Schools ===
Qingdao University is divided into 35 colleges and schools, besides a medical department.

These colleges and schools include:

- School of Philosophy and History
- School of Economics
- School of Law
- School of Marxism
- School of Politics and Public Administration
- College of Teacher Education
- School of Physical Education
- School of Chinese Language and Literature
- School of Foreign Languages
- School of Foreign Language Education
- School of International Studies
- School of Journalism and Communication
- School of Mathematics and Statistics
- School of Physical Sciences
- School of Chemistry and Chemical Engineering
- School of Life Sciences
- School of Electromechanic Engineering
- School of Material Science and Engineering
- School of Automation and Electrical Engineering
- School of Electronic Information
- School of Computer Science and Technology
- School of Environmental Science and Engineering
- School of Textile and Garment
- School of Data Science and Software Engineering
- School of Applied Technology
- Medical Department
- School of Basic Medicine
- School of Dental Medicine
- School of Public Health
- School of Pharmacy
- School of Nursing
- School of Business
- School of Tourism and Geographical Science
- School of Music
- School of Fine Arts

Two hospitals belong to Qingdao University:

- The Affiliated Hospital of Qingdao University
- The Affiliated Cardiovascular Disease Hospital of Qingdao University

=== International Education and Cooperation ===
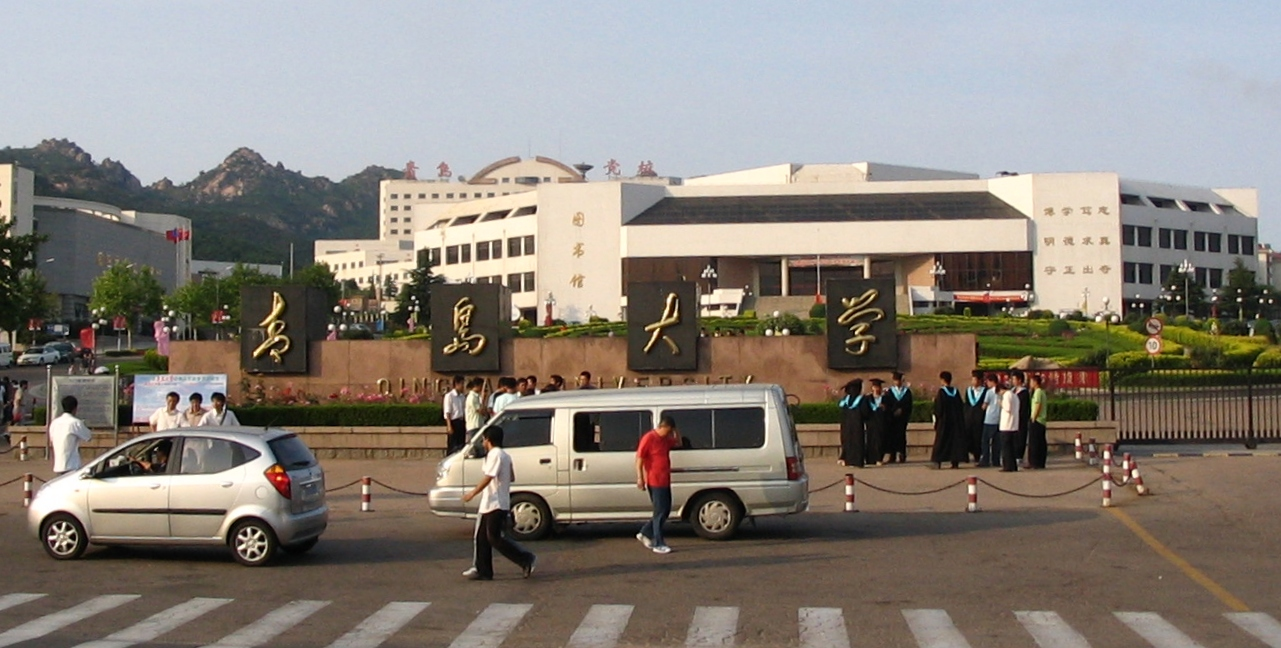
Entrance to the Main campus of Qingdao University

Qingdao University College of Medical Science is recognized by the World Health Organization and is listed in the World Directory of Medical Schools.

== Notable faculty ==
- Keum-Shik Hong

== Affiliated Hospitals ==
Seven hospitals are affiliated with the university.

- The Affiliated Hospital of Qingdao University
- The Affiliated Cardiovascular Hospital of Qingdao University
- Qingdao Center Medical Group
- Qingdao Municipal Hospital
- Yantai Yuhuangding Hospital
- Qingdao Haici Medical Group
- Weihai Municipal Hospital

== Controversy ==
In July 2025, a dormitory security guard at Qingdao University was found unconscious due to heatstroke in his duty room and was later pronounced dead despite emergency medical treatment. According to Chinese Business View, multiple university departments are still investigating the incident. The logistics office, student affairs office, and general duty office have shifted responsibility among themselves; the campus hospital stated it had not been notified, while the university's security and safety management departments confirmed an investigation is underway. Online posts claim the guard lived frugally, cared for stray cats, wore clothes left behind by graduates, and had reportedly not been paid for several months.

== See also ==
- Qingdao Medical College
