= Zhejiang University of Technology =

Public university in Hangzhou, Zhejiang, China

- 浙江工业大学
- Former name: Zhejiang Institute of Technology
- Motto: 厚德健行
- Motto in English: Good Virtue and Robust Practice, from I Ching
- Type: Public
- Established: 1953; 73 years ago
- Budget: CNY 3.95 billion (2023)
- President: Chen Jiming
- Faculty: 3,389 (2023)
- Undergraduates: 20,536 (2023)
- Postgraduates: 14,561 (2023)
- Location: Hangzhou & Deqing, Zhejiang, China; 30.23°N 120.04°E
- Colors: Gongda Blue
- Website: www.zjut.edu.cn http://www.english.zjut.edu.cn/ (English)]
- Location within Zhejiang Location within China

Zhejiang University of Technology
- Simplified Chinese: 浙江工业大学
- Traditional Chinese: 浙江工業大學
Transcriptions
Standard Mandarin
- Hanyu Pinyin: Zhèjiāng Gōngyè Dàxué

The Zhejiang University of Technology (浙江工业大学; 'Zhejiang Industrial University') is a public comprehensive university in Hangzhou, capital of Zhejiang, China. It is affiliated with the Province of Zhejiang.
