= List of modern scientists from Zhejiang =

Zhejiang Province is one of the smallest provinces (both in population and area) in China but quite well known for its academic prosperity and scholars. The province has produced a large number of distinguished scientists. In ancient time, such as Wang Chong of the Han dynasty, Shen Kuo of the Song dynasty, Huang Zongxi of the Ming and Qing dynasties from Zhejiang reached research climaxes of natural sciences in their own eras, however, this item would only focus on those modern scientists from Zhejiang.

Notations

Notations for memberships of academies

- United States of America:
  - Foreign Member/Member of the United States National Academy of Sciences = FM/M-NAS
  - Foreign Member/Member of the United States National Academy of Engineering = FM/M-NAE
  - Foreign Member/Member of the Institute of Medicine of the United States National Academies = FM/M-IM
  - Member/Fellow of the American Academy of Arts and Sciences = M/F-AAAS
  - Member of the New York Academy of Sciences = M-NYAS
- United Kingdom:
  - Fellow of the Royal Society = FRS
  - Fellow of the Royal Academy of Engineering = FRAE
  - Fellow of the British Academy = FBA
  - Fellow of the Royal Society of Edinburgh = FRSE
- Germany:
  - Foreign Member of the German Academy of Sciences Leopoldina = FM-GASL
  - Foreign Member of the Bavarian Academy of Sciences and Humanities = FM-BASH
- France:
  - Foreign Member of the French Academy of Sciences = FM-FAS
- Russia:
  - Foreign Member of the Russian Academy of Sciences = FM-RAS
  - Foreign Member of the Russian Academy of Engineering = FM-RAE
- Republic of China/Taiwan:
  - Academician/Member of the Academia Sinica = M-AS
- People's Republic of China:
  - Foreign Member/Member of the Chinese Academy of Sciences = FM/M-CAS
  - Foreign Member/Member of the Chinese Academy of Engineering = FM/M-CAE
- Other:
  - Member of the Third World Academy of Sciences = M-TWAS
  - Member of the International Academy of Astronautics = M-IAA

Notations for personal profiles

- Priority: Hometown > birthplace > study/work (based on traditional Chinese convention)
- Hometown: h.
- Birthplace: b.
- Have trained/studied in Zhejiang: s.
- Have worked in Zhejiang: w.

== Introduction ==
In the historic first election (in 1948) of the Academia Sinica, about 1/4 academicians came from Zhejiang, the first two Presidents of the Academia Sinica (Cai Yuanpei and Chu Ka-Wa) also were born in Zhejiang. Currently Zhejiang has produced the most members of the Chinese Academy of Engineering (CAE), and the second most members of the Chinese Academy of Sciences (CAS), only after Jiangsu Province, where is also very famous for its scientific and technological tradition. Current CAS President Lu Yongxiang and CAE President Xu Kuangdi were both born in Zhejiang.

Many scientists and engineers have studied and/or worked at institutes of Zhejiang, such as Chien-Shiung Wu and Tsung-Dao Lee.

Outside of Chinese speaking regions, many academics of overseas Chinese have roots in Zhejiang.

== Hometown Zhejiang ==
=== United States ===
- Shu Chien (钱煦) (h.Hangzhou; b.Beiping): National Medal of Science 2011 Laureate
- Roger Y. Tsien (钱永健) (h.Hangzhou; b.New York City): Nobel Prize in Chemistry 2008 Laureate
- Ho-Kwang Mao (毛河光) (h.Jiangshan of Quzhou; b.Shanghai): M-AS/NAS, FRS, FM-RSAS/CAS
- Paul Chien (钱锟) (h.Hangzhou; b.Hong Kong)
- Alfred Chuang (庄思浩) (h.Ningbo; b.Hong Kong)
- Kai Lai Chung (钟开莱) (h.Hangzhou)
- Robert Tjian (钱泽南) (h.Shaoxing; b.Hong Kong): M-NAS/AS
- Bin He (贺斌) (b.Wenzhou): FIEEE/FAIMBE
- Simon Sze (施敏) (h.Zhejiang): M-NAE/AS
- Ping-ti Ho (何炳棣) (h.Jinhua; b.Tianjin): M-AAAS/AS
- Savio L-Y. Woo (胡流源) (h.Ningbo; b.Shanghai): M-IM/NAE/AS/IOC Academy
- Shien Biau Woo (吴仙标) (h.Yuyao of Ningbo; b.Shanghai)
- King-Sun Fu (傅京孫) (h.Lishui; b.Nanking): M-NAE/AS
- Fang Lizhi (方励之) (h.Hangzhou; b.Beijing): M-CAS (deleted)

=== Mainland China ===
- Fujia Yang (杨福家) (h.Ningbo; b.Shanghai): M-CAS/TWAS
- Yang Fuyu (杨福愉) (h.Ningbo; b.Shanghai): M-CAS/TWAS
- Zhao Jiuzhang (赵九章) (h.Huzhou; b.Kaifeng): M-CAS
- Cheng Chemin (郑哲敏) (h.Ningbo; b.Jinan): M-CAS/CAE, FM-NAE
- Ni Weidou (倪维斗) (h.Ningbo; b.Shanghai): M-CAE
- Hsu Pao-Lu (许宝騄) (h.Hangzhou): M-AS/CAS
- Huang Kun (黄昆) (h.Jiaxing): M-CAS/TWAS
- Feng Duan (冯端) (h.Shaoxing): M-CAS/TWAS
- Feng Kang (冯康) (h.Shaoxing): M-CAS
- Jin Yuelin (金岳霖) (h.Zhuji of Shaoxing; b.Changsha): M-AS/CAS
- Yan Luguang (严陆光) (h.Dongyang of Jinhua; b.Beijing): M-CAS/TWAS
- Yu Dafu (俞大紱) (h.Shaoxing): M-AS/CAS
- Wu Wenjun (吴文俊) (h.Jiaxing; b.Shanghai): M-CAS/TWAS

=== Taiwan, Hong Kong, Macau ===
- Frank Shu (徐遐生) (h.Wenzhou; b.Kunming): Shaw Prize 2008 Laureate
- Chien Shih-Liang (钱思亮) (h.Hangzhou): M-AS
- Chen Li-an (陈履安) (h.Qingtian of Lishui)
- Lap-Chee Tsui (徐立之) (h.Hangzhou; b.Shanghai): M-AS, FRS, FRSC, FM-NAS
- Woo Chia-wei (吴家玮) (h.Hangzhou; b.Shanghai): NAS

== Birthplace Zhejiang ==
=== USA, UK, Canada, Australia, Singapore ===
- Morris Chang (张忠谋) (b.Ningbo): IEEE Medal of Honor 2011 Laureate
- Shiing-Shen Chern (陈省身) (b.Jiaxing): Wolf Prize in Mathematics 1981 Laureate
- Van C. Mow (毛昭宪) (b.Fenghua of Ningbo): M-IM/NAE/AS/TWAS
- T. Tony Cai (蔡天文) (b.Chun'an of Wenzhou)
- Kwang-Chu Chao (赵广绪)
- Liu Chen (陈骝) (b.Hangzhou)
- Ven Te Chow (周文德) (b.Hangzhou): M-NAE/AAAS/AS
- Jay Gan (甘剑英) (b.Changxing of Huzhou)
- Kun-Liang Guan (管坤良) (b.Tongxiang of Jiaxing)
- Pengfei Guan (管鹏飞) (b.Huangyan of Taizhou): F-RSC
- Bin He (贺斌) (b.Wenzhou): FIEEE/FAIMBE
- Ky Fan (樊土畿) (b.Hangzhou): M-AS
- Wu-Chung Hsiang (项武忠) (b.Yueqing of Wenzhou): M-AS
- Sze-Tsen Hu (胡世桢) (b.Zhejiang): M-AS
- T. C. Hsu (徐道觉) (b.Shaoxing)
- Binghui Shen (b.Zhejiang)
- Lin Fanghua (林芳华) (b.Zhenhai of Ningbo): Bôcher Memorial Prize 2002
- Ping King Tien (田炳耕) (b.Shangyu of Shaoxing): M-NAS/NAE/AS/TWAS
- Richard Tsien (钱永佑) (b.Hangzhou): M-NAS/IM/AAAS/AS
- Hsue-Chu Tsien (钱学榘) (b.Hangzhou)
- Lizhen Ji (季理真) (b.Wenzhou)
- Tao Yang (b.Zhejiang)
- Junying Yu (b.Shaoxing)
- Chung Tao Yang (杨忠道) (b.Wenzhou): M-AS
- Xu-Jia Wang (汪徐家) (b.Chun'an of Hangzhou): F-AAS
- Su-Chun Zhang (张素春) (b.Wenzhou)
- Liangchi Zhang (章亮炽) (b.Taizhou): F-ATSE
- Wei Zheng (b.Zhejiang): M-NYAS
- Chen-Bo Zhu (朱程波) (b. Ningbo): F-SNAS
- Min Zhu (朱敏) (b.Ningbo)
- Jia Rongqing (贾荣庆) (b.Zhejiang)

=== Mainland China ===
- Tu Youyou (b.Ningbo): Albert Lasker Award for Clinical Medical Research 2011 Laureate
- Tan Jiazhen (b.Ningbo): M-CAS/TWAS/NYAS, FM-NAS
- Tong Dizhou (b.Ningbo): M-AS/CAS
- Tsien Hsue-shen (b.Hangzhou): M-CAS/CAE/IAA
- Tu Shou'e (屠守锷) (b.Huzhou): M-CAS/IAA
- Li Shanlan (b.Jiaxing)
- Liu Yuanfang (b.Ningbo): M-CAS
- Lu Yongxiang (b.Ningbo): M-CAS/CAE/TWAS, FM-RAS/AAS/GASL
- Bei Shizhang (b.Ningbo): M-AS/CAS
- Cai Yuanpei (b.Shaoxing): M-AS
- Chung-Yao Chao (b.Shaoxing): M-CAS
- Chen Da (b.Ningbo)
- Chen Jiangong (b.Shaoxing): M-CAS
- Coching Chu (b.Shaoxing): M-AS/CAS
- Cai Xitao (b.Jinhua)
- Dai Chuanzeng (b.Ningbo): M-CAS
- Ding Zhongli (b.Shaoxing): M-CAS
- Du Qinghua (b.Hangzhou): M-CAE
- Gu Chaohao (b.Wenzhou): M-CAS/TWAS
- Pan Yunhe (b.Hangzhou): M-CAE
- Pan Jiazheng (b.Shaoxing): M-CAE/CAS
- Li Zhijian (b.Ningbo): M-CAS/TWAS
- Han Qide (b.Ningbo): M-CAS
- Han Zhenxiang (韩祯祥) (b.Hangzhou): M-CAS
- He Xiantu (b.Ningbo): M-CAS
- Hu Haichang (b.Hangzhou): M-CAS
- Huang Daren (b.Xiangshan of Ningbo)
- Ma Yinchu (b.Shaoxing): M-AS/CAS
- Feng Te-Pei (冯德培) (b.Taizhou): M-AS/CAS, FM-NAS
- Shen Tianhui (b.Jiashan of Jiaxing)
- Ke Zhao (b.Taizhou): M-CAS
- Jiang Lifu (姜立夫) (b.Wenzhou): M-AS/CAS
- Jin Guozhang (b.Jinhua): M-CAS
- Jin Li (b.Shaoxing)
- Xia Nai (b.Wenzhou): M-CAS/TWAS, FM-NAS, FBA, FRSALHA
- Xie Shengwu (b.Shaoxing)
- Xu Guangxian (b.Shaoxing): M-CAS/TWAS
- Xu Kuangdi (b.Jiaxing): M-CAE, FRAE, FRSAES
- Qiu Fazu (b.Hangzhou): M-CAS/TWAS
- Qian Sanqiang (b.Shaoxing): M-CAS/TWAS
- Ren Mei'e (b.Ningbo): M-CAE/TWAS
- Shao Xianghua (b.Hangzhou): M-CAS/CAE
- Shi Zhongci (b.Ningbo): M-CAS/TWAS
- Su Buqing (b.Wenzhou): M-AS/CAS/TWAS
- Sun Guangyuan (b.Hangzhou)
- Wang Guosong (b.Wenzhou)
- Wang You (b.Hangzhou): M-CAS, FM-BASH/FAS
- Wang Yuan (b.Jinhua): M-CAS/TWAS
- Weng Shilie (b.Ningbo): M-CAE
- Weng Wenhao (b.Ningbo): M-AS
- Wu Ziliang (吴自良) (b.Jinhua): M-CAS
- Yan Jici (严济慈) (b.Jinhua): M-AS/CAS
- Yang Huanming (b.Wenzhou): M-CAS/TWAS
- Zhang Xiaowen (张孝文) (b.Ningbo)
- Zhang Zhongjun (b.Jiaxing): M-CAS
- Zhu Zuxiang (b.Ningbo): M-CAS
- Zhu Zhaoxiang (b.Ningbo)
- Zhu Miaolong (b.Ningbo)
- Zhou Jianren (b.Shaoxing)

=== Taiwan ===
- Chang Chi-yun (张其昀) (b.Ningbo): M-AS
- Chang Jen-Hu (张镜湖) (b.Ningbo)
- Lo Tsung-lo (罗宗洛) (b.Taizhou): M-AS/CAS
- Li Hsi-mou (b.Jiaxing)
- Lu Chih-houng (b.Jiaxing)
- Mao Gao-wen (毛高文) (b.Ningbo)
- Shu Shien-Siu (b.Wenzhou): M-AS
- Shen Chun-shan (沈君山) (b.Ningbo)
- Wei-Tou Ni (倪维斗) (b.Ningbo)
- Shu Shien-Siu (徐贤修) (b.Wenzhou): M-AS

=== Hong Kong & Macau ===
- Jian-Shu Li (励建书) (b.Hangzhou)
- Tang Yuhan (b.Ningbo)
- Ambrose King (b.Taizhou): M-AS
- Mingjie Zhang (b.Ningbo)

== Studied/Worked in Zhejiang ==
=== United States ===
- Chien-Shiung Wu (s.w.): M-NAS/AAAS/AS, FRSE, FM-CAS
- Tsung-Dao Lee (s.): M-NAS/AAAS/AS, FM-CAS
- Hsiao-Lan Kuo (s.w.): M-AS
- Ba Denian (w.): M-CAE, FM-IM
- Jin Au Kong (w.): M-AS
- Xia Daoxing (s.): M-CAS

=== Mainland China ===
- Kefeng Liu (w.)
- Chen Hang (s.w.)
- Li Shouheng (w.)
- Hu Hesheng (s.w.): M-CAS

== See also ==
- List of modern scientists from Jiangsu
- List of modern scientists from Shanghai
