= Jiashan Senior High School =

- 318 Jiashan People Ave. China

Information
- Type: Public
- Established: September, 1926
- School district: Jiashan County, Zhejiang Province
- Head of school: President and Party chief is Zhou Jianyi
- Grades: K-12
- Website: http://www.jsgjzx.com/

Jiashan Senior High School (Chinese: 嘉善高级中学), formerly known as Jiashan County Junior High School, Jiashan County First Junior High School, and Jiashan Second High School, was founded in September 1926. It is the earliest established high school in Jiashan County and is a key high school in Zhejiang Province. In August 2001, the school was relocated to a new site, 318 Jiashan People Ave., and was renamed Jiashan Senior High School.

== History ==
In 1920s, under the influence of May 4th Movement, the democrats and celebrities in Jiashan County advocated and promoted fundamental education. Approved by the County Council, "Jiashan County Junior High School" was founded in 1926. The original site was located outside the east county gate (now Sixian Department Store). The school officially opened on September 20, 1926, and the first principal was Mr. Wu Zhaohuan (吴兆焕). It is the precedent of Jiashan Senior High School, and is also the earliest established high school in Jiashan County.

Over the years the school altered its name occasionally and it was relocated several times. After the outbreak of Sino-Japanese War, Jiashan was soon occupied by Japanese, and the school was forced to close in November, 1937. Thanks to the efforts of pioneering scholars, the school was moved to Xitang Town in spring of 1938 and the class was resumed. In the following years, the school moved back and forth to Xitang and Tianning under the Japanese occupation, and struggled to remain open in harsh times. After VJ-day in August, 1945, the school moved back from Tianning to the county seat, and built a new campus in Miancheng Garden in Tianjia Lane (now printing factory in Xingxian Rd.). A second campus was also expanded in Xitang whre Jiashan Third High School.

In May, 1949, Jiashan was occupied by CPC army and the school was taken over by a military unit. Before the opening of fall semester, the government decided to relocate to school to the site of elementary normal school in Dasheng Temple, outside east gate (now Xiaosi Lane), and the two schools merged. In spring 1950, the school was again relocated to the Confucius Temple (now Second Senior High School). In autumn of that year, the teacher training section was abolished, and the Xitang campus became independent.

In July 1953, the school was renamed "Jiashan First Junior High School". In September 1958, it established agriculture department and its name changed to "Jiashan Agricultural Specialized School". Meanwhile, a workshop, a farmer and a ranch were formed, affiliated to the school. In March 1959, Jiashan County was merged into Jiaxing County and the school was renamed "Jiaxing County Agricultural Specialized School". Another institute, "Jiaxing South Lake Agricultural Specialized School" was merged into it. At that time, the school still retained over 10 classes at junior high level, besides agricultural sections. In that year, due to the achievement in labor-sustained education, the then president, Liu Maoxuan, was invited to attend the "National Elite Workers Conference in Culture and Education System" in Beijing. In April 1960, the school was renamed "Jiaxing Thirteenth High School". In August 1961, Jiaxing and Jiashan were divided into two counties, and the school adopted the name "Jiashan Weitang High School". During Cultural Revolution, in December 1966, the school changed the name to "Jiashan Oriental Red High School", and was managed by the Indigence Management Commission of Fengtong Commune.

The school began normalization in 1972. In that fall, new students enrolled in senior high section and the school transformed to a comprehensive high school, consisting of both junior and senior high sections. In December 1972, it adopted the name "Jiashan Second High School" and retained the name till July 2001.

Since the Reform and Openness, the school has witnessed a period of speedy development. In August 1978, Jiashan Second High School was accredited as "Provincial Key High School" by provincial government. The school gradually switched its emphasis from junior high to senior high, and its education quality has been greatly improved. In 1984, the school was honored as "Advanced Group of Primary and High Schools of Zhejiang Province".

Approved by Jiashan County government, Jiashan Second High School transformed to an exclusive senior high school in August 1992, and the junior high section was abolished. Thus, the main focus of the school has become the preparatory education for colleges and universities. In 1995 and 1996, the school set historical records of college enrollment in national college entrance exams. Since then, it has enjoyed renowned social reputation.

In October 1996, the school celebrated its 70th anniversary. In May 1998, the school was honored as one of "Provincial First-Class Key High School" by Zhejiang government.

The new campus was established in August 2001. After relocation, the school was renamed "Jiashan Senior High School".

The current president and Party chief is Zhou Jianyi (周建夷).

== Notable alumni ==
- Huang Ju, a politician and vice premier of the People's Republic of China
- Shen Tianhui, an academician of Chinese Academy of Sciences, a professor of Shanghai Jiao Tong University
- Zhang Zhongjun, an academician of Chinese Academy of Sciences, a professor of Shanghai Jiao Tong University. Founder of Chinese AI automation engineering
- Yuan Guirong, a geologist
- Jiang XueZhu, an educator best known for principal role in Songjiang Girl's School and Taipei's 1st Girl's Middle school both of which she served twenty-two years each. She is known to push through the reforms. The alumni never failed to show up wearing famous green and black uniform. Its alumni are widely regarded as exceptional citizens, leaders, and role models who have made remarkable contributions to society across a wide range of professional, academic, and political fields internationally
- Wu Liangzhi, a computer scientist of Peking University
