= Shanghai Science and Technology Museum =

Museum in Shanghai, China

Coordinates: 31°13′13″N 121°32′16″E

- 上海科技馆
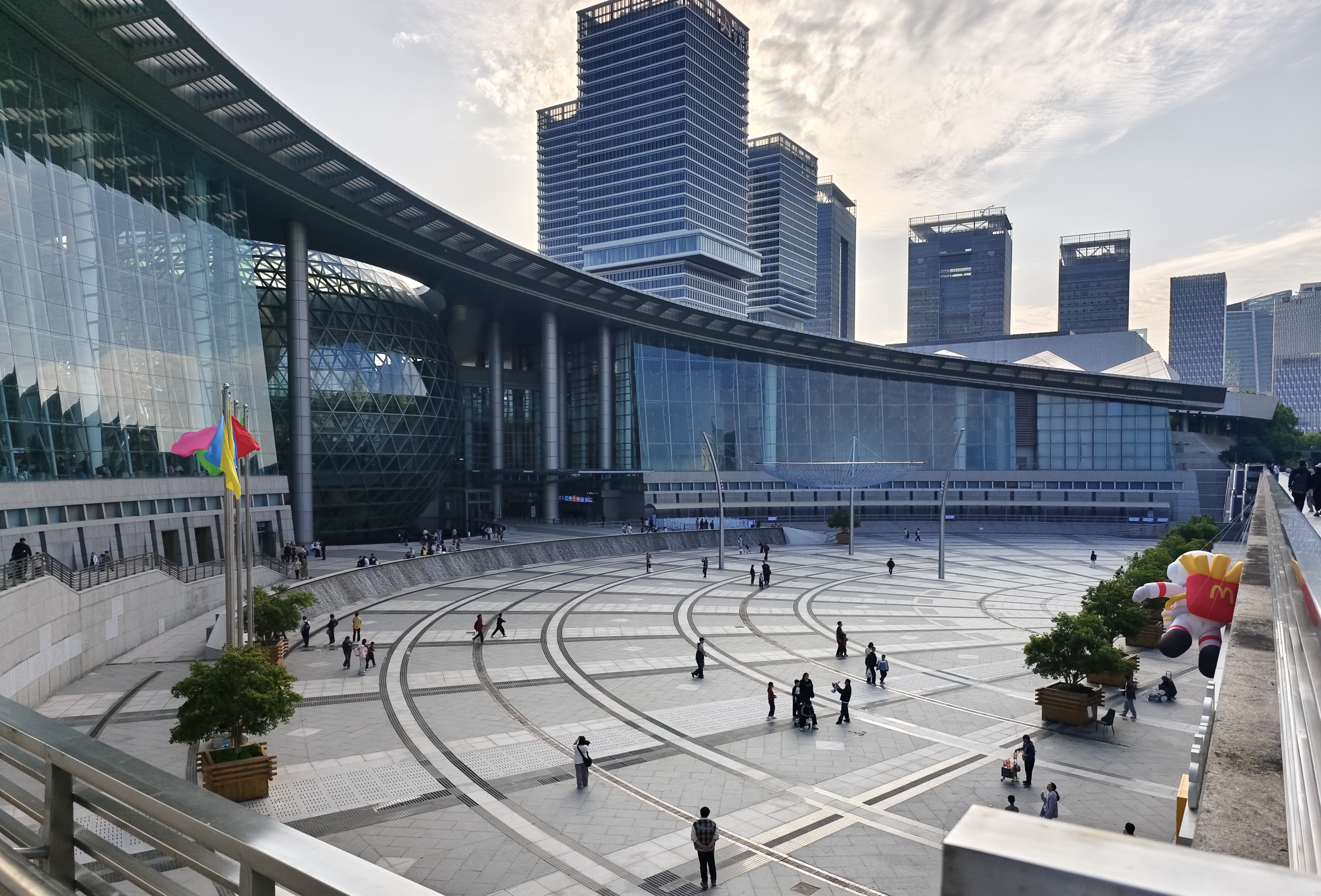
- A view of the exterior of the museum in 2026
- Established: 18 December 2001
- Location: 2000 Century Avenue, Pudong, Shanghai, China
- Accreditation: Asia Pacific Network of Science & Technology Centres (ASPAC)
- Visitors: 1,351,000
- Public transit access: SSTM Station on Line 2 of the Shanghai Metro
- Website: www.sstm.org.cn (in Chinese)

Shanghai Science and Technology Museum
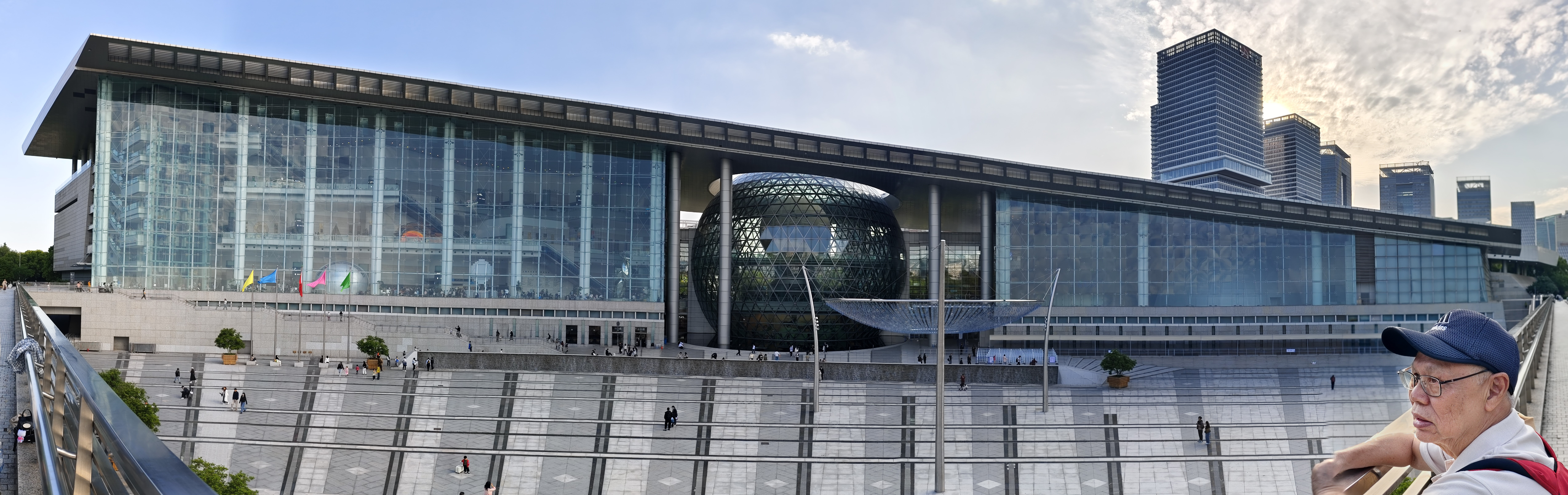
- Chinese: 上海科技馆
Transcriptions
Standard Mandarin
- Hanyu Pinyin: Shànghǎi kējì guǎn
- Wade–Giles: Shang-hai K‘o-chi Kuan
Wu
- Romanization: Zånhae Kuji Gue

Shanghai Science and Technology Museum is a large museum in Pudong, Shanghai, close to Century Park, the largest park within the inner districts of the city. It is one of China's most-visited museums. It received 1,351,000 visitors in 2020, despite a fall of attendance of 72 percent from 2019 due to restrictions and reduced tourism imposed by the COVID-19 pandemic.

== History ==
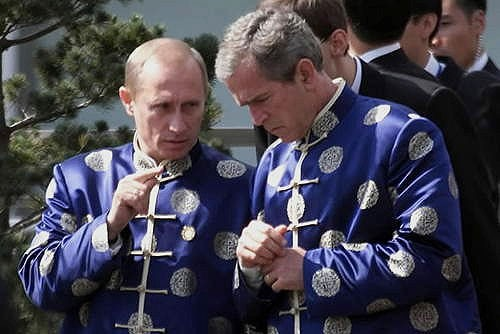
Russian & US presidents Vladimir Putin and George W. Bush at the 2001 APEC meeting

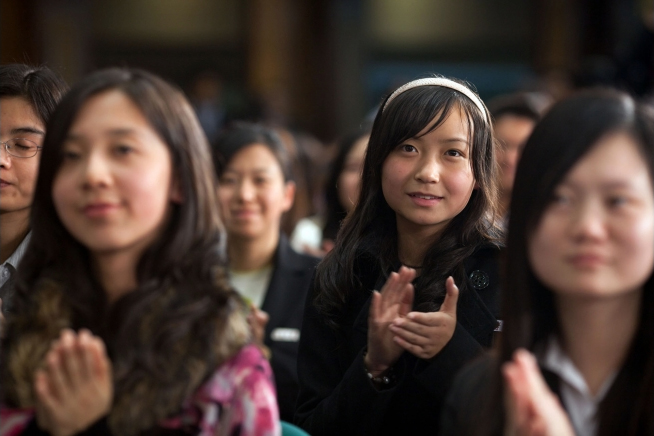
Shanghainese students at the SSTM during Barack Obama's visit

Century Square was built in 1995, and the Shanghai Science and Technology Museum was planned for its western side as a key project for popularizing science in the Yangtze Delta region. As part of the Huamu Civic Center, it was also intended to help drive Pudong's continued development away from Lujiazui and other neighborhoods along the banks of the Huangpu River. The museum completed its conference and meeting halls in time to host the APEC Leaders' Meeting on 20 and 21 October 2001, receiving Chinese paramount leader Jiang Zemin, Russian president Vladimir Putin, and US president George W. Bush.

The Science and Technology Museum completed its first phase of construction and opened its exhibits to the general public on 18 December 2001. Its initial themes were the harmony of nature, mankind, and technology (Chinese: 自然·人·科技, Zìrán, Rén, Kējì) and its first five exhibition halls were devoted to "Heaven and Earth", "Life", "Wisdom", "Creativity", and "the Future".

The second phase of the project opened in May 2005, at which time it was the first science and technology museum authenticated to meet ISO 9000/14000 quality and environmental standards. Between its opening and 2010, it attracted 19.5 million visitors. The children's area and Light of Wisdom exhibition were renovated from January to May 2010, ahead of the Shanghai World Expo held that year. Initially named a AAAA-rated tourist attraction by the CNTA, the Shanghai Science and Technology Museum has since been upgraded to AAAAA status. US president Barack Obama held a town hall meeting with Shanghainese students at the Science and Technology Museum on 16 November 2009 during his state visit.

== Administration ==
The SSTM is not a purely public institution, but a foundation under public administration funded by private businesses in Shanghai. These include the Pudong Development Bank, the Shanghai Science and Technology Investment Corporation, Beijing Zhijin Venture Capital, and Top Group. The foundation also administers other scientific museums in Shanghai, such as the Shanghai Natural History Museum and Shanghai Planetarium.

== Architecture ==
The original design of the museum was managed by Shanghai-based Creative Star Digital, who planned it to accommodate 2–3 million visitors per year. It cost 3.75 billion rmb ($180 million) with an investment of 1,755 billion rmb. The museum building is an ascending spiral rising from one to five floors, intended to symbolize scientific and technological progress. The enormous glass sphere at its center denotes the rise of life out of water. Its grounds cover an area of 6.8 hectares (17 acres), with a floor space of 98,000 square meters (1,050,000 sq ft). 65,500 square meters (705,000 sq ft) of this is used for the exhibition space. The museum's HVAC was digitized and advanced enough for its time that it was once considered for a separate exhibit of its own.

As part of Pudong's Huamu Civic Center, the museum building helps anchor the southern end of the district's principal thoroughfare Century Avenue, facing onto the 250,000-square-meter (2,700,000 sq ft) Century Square, with its underground shopping area and subway station. Century Park lies nearby and, together, the complex has helped rebrand the district and encourage luxury housing developments in the surrounding area.

== Exhibitions ==
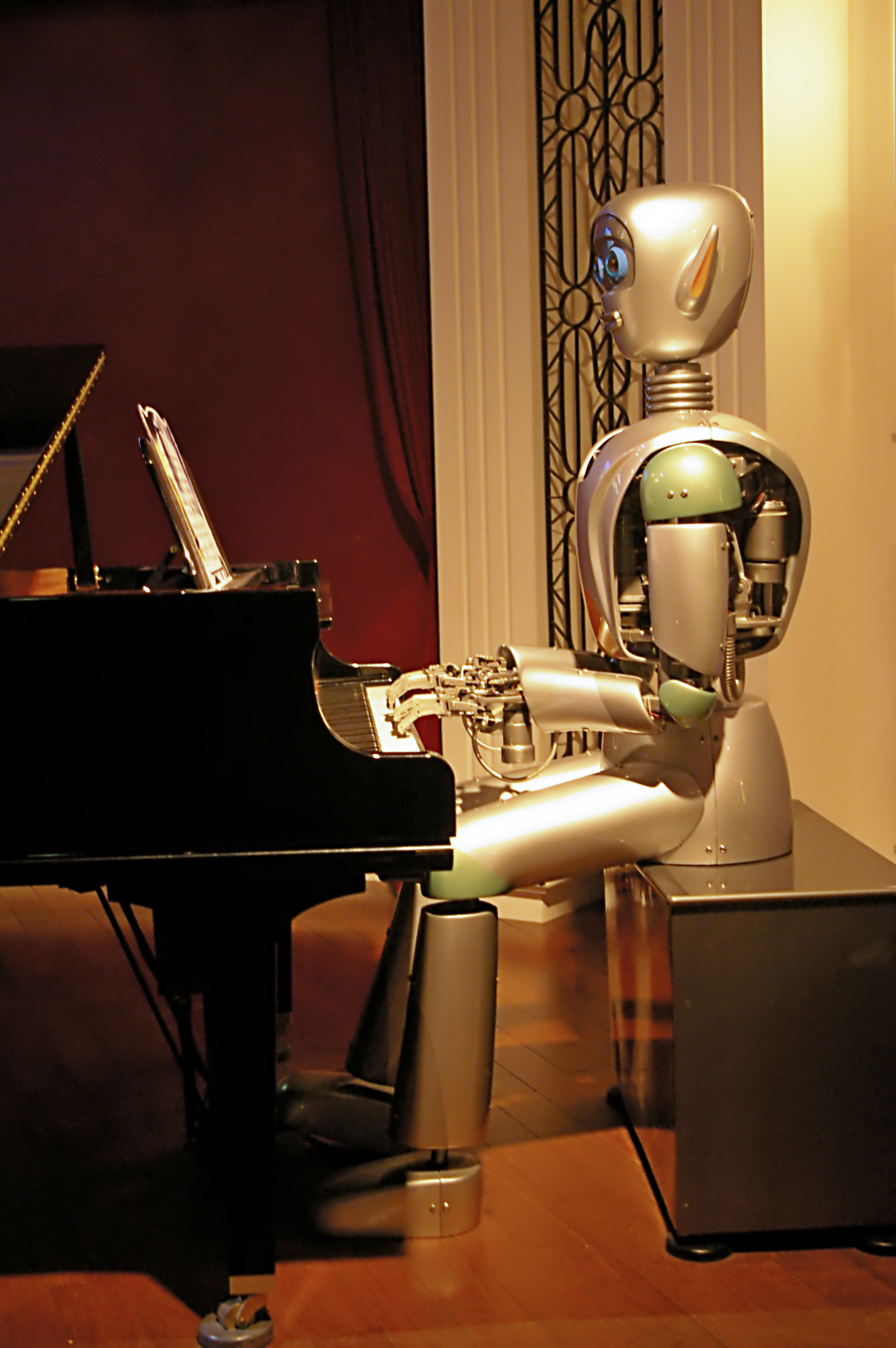
A pianist in the "World of Robots" exhibition.

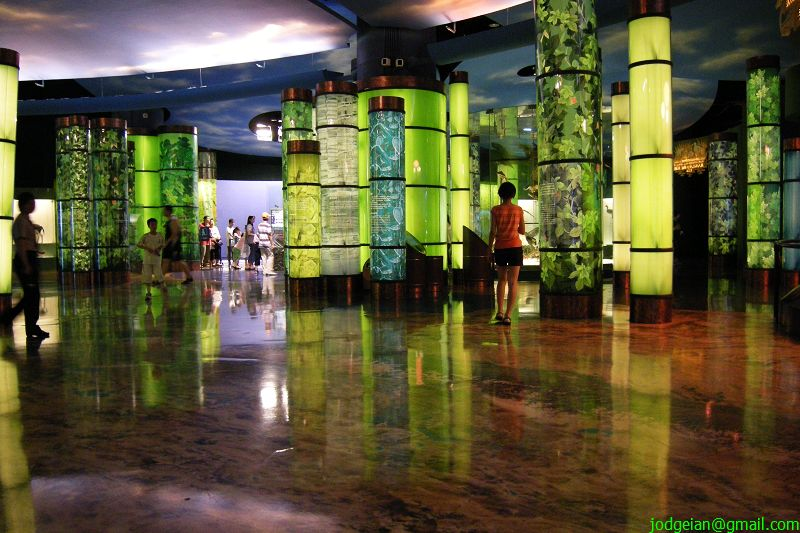
Part of the "Home on Earth" exhibition.

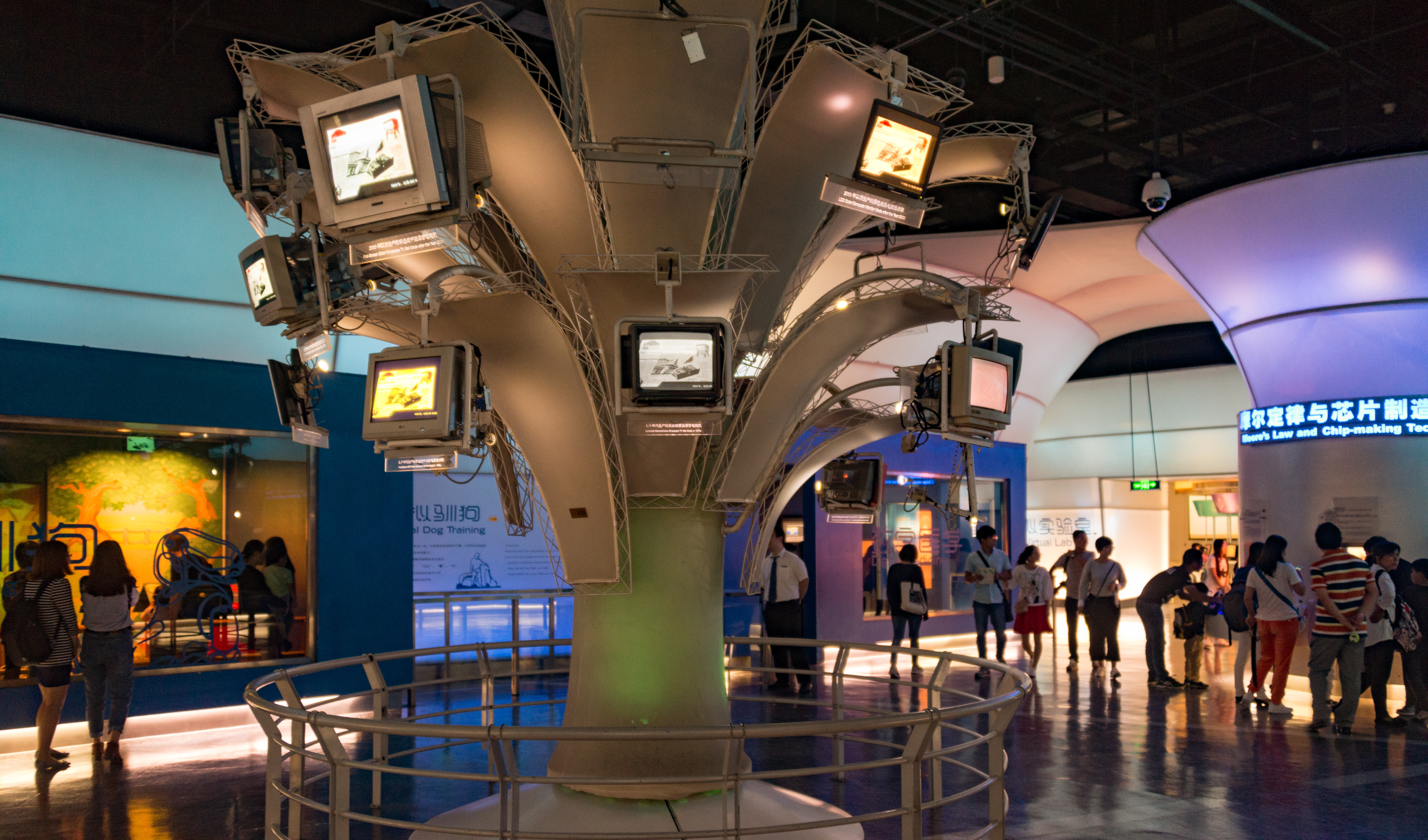
Part of the "Information Era" exhibition.

The museum is dedicated to the popularization of science, with an intended theme of the harmony of "Nature, Mankind, and Technology". Like the overall building design, the original exhibits were designed by Creative Star Digital.

It has 13 main permanent exhibitions and 4 science-themed cinemas. The exhibitions are:

1. Spectrum of Life: A natural exhibit which imitates the scenery of Yunnan Province and displays its diversity of creatures.
2. Earth Exploration
3. Cradle of Design or Designers where visitors can use CAD/CAM to design and build small things
4. Children's Rainbow Land (Note: Originally, "Technoland", "Children's Science Park", or "Children's Science Land".)
5. Light of Wisdom
6. Home on Earth
7. Information Era
8. World of Robots
9. Light of Exploration is an exhibit which showcases human scientific achievements of the 20th century.
10. Human and Health
11. Space Navigation
12. World of Animals (Note: Originally called the "Animal Hall" and considered a "special exhibition" but now permanent.)
13. Spiders Exhibition

The Chinese Ancient Science and Technology Gallery showcases ancient Chinese inventions and works. The Explorers' Gallery features Chinese and foreign explorers. The Academicians' Gallery features contemporary scientists from China, particularly Shanghai.

There was previously also an "Audio-Visual Discovery Paradise", s small-scale hydroelectric power station, a 700 square meters (7,500 sq ft) rain forest, an aviary, an aquarium, and an earthquake center including a motive platform with video allowing visitors to experience simulated tremors. The exhibitions are intended to "represent cutting-edge scientific development" using "innovative and unique exhibition methods" but many have not been updated since their installation. This behavior is common in China, where museums often subcontract all their exhibits' designs to private firms without any longterm arrangement to maintain or update them.

There are also two temporary exhibition halls.

The museum opened with 2 IMAX cinemas. With the later addition of another two, the cineplex is the largest dedicated to science education in Asia, with 10,000 showtimes each year. They are:

1. IMAX 3D Theater (Note: Formerly, the "Large-Format Theater".)
2. IMAX Dome Theater
3. IWERKS Theater
4. Space Theater

== Hours of Operation ==
The museum is open from 09:00 to 17:15. It is closed on Monday (except holidays).

== Transportation ==
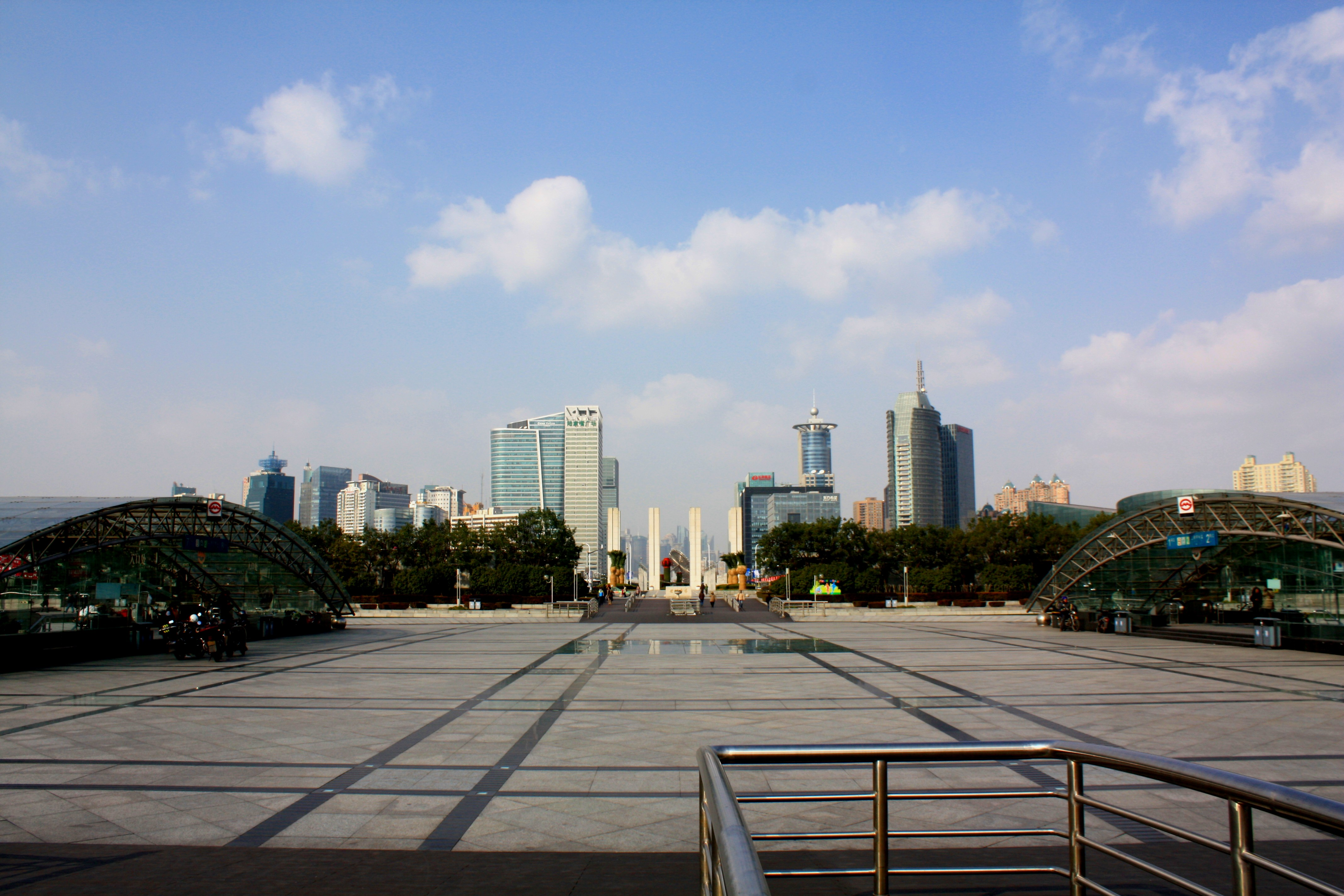
A view north towards Century Avenue, showing the subway station entrances on either side of the plaza in front of the SSTM

The Shanghai Science and Technology Museum Station is a stop on Line 2 of the Shanghai Metro. Pudian Rd. Station on Line 4 is also within walking distance. The site also has a bus stop served by several routes, including Routes 794 and 640.

== Popular media ==
The promotional video for the Shanghai World Expo in 2010 shot several scenes on location in and around the Science and Technology Museum. Its futuristic appearance has made it a common setting for Chinese media.

There are many scenes filmed at the museum in the Chinese movie Kung Fu Dunk, starring Jay Chou. The Indian movie Chandni Chowk to China also filmed some scenes at the SSTM.

The museum was the Pit Stop for Leg 10 of the TV series The Amazing Race 16.

== See also ==
- List of museums in China
- List of modern scientists from Shanghai
