= Northwest Africa 16788 =

Meteorite found in Niger

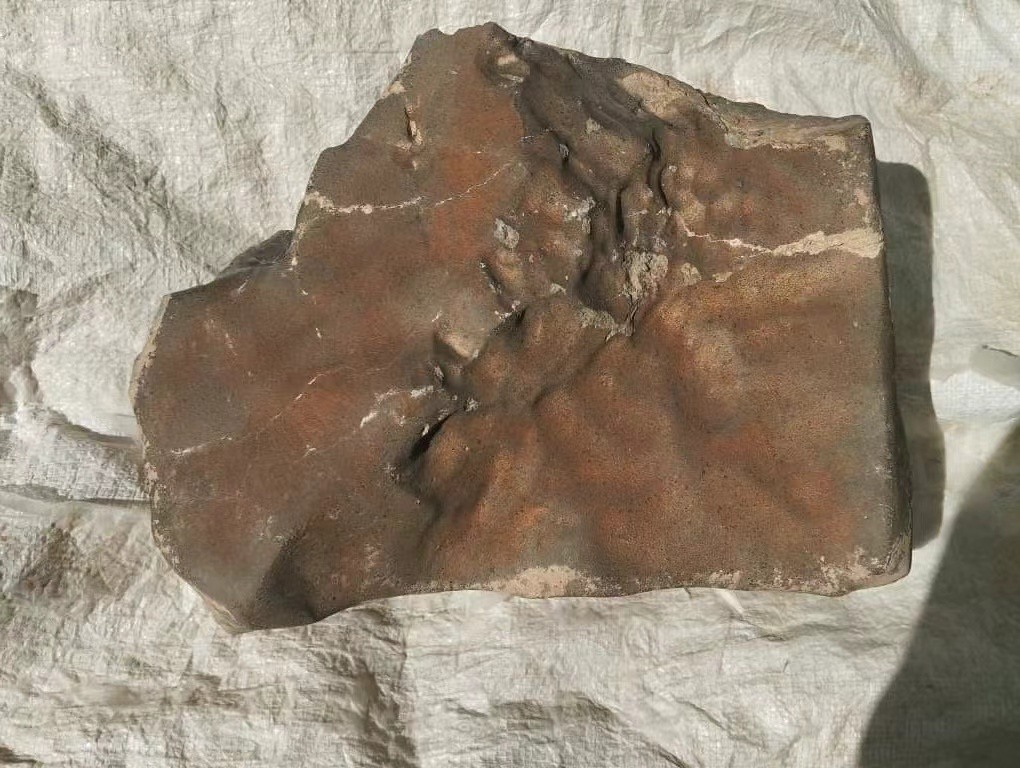
- Type: Shergottite
- Class: Martian meteorite
- Country: Niger
- Found date: 16 July 2023

Northwest Africa 16788, aka NWA 16788, is the largest meteorite from Mars ever found on Earth. It weighs 24.67 kg, making it about 70% larger than any other known Martian fragment.

On 16 July 2025, it was sold at a Sotheby's auction for $5.3 million.

== History ==
NWA 16788 was found in the Agadez Region of Niger on 16 July 2023 90 km west of the Chirfa Oasis, by "a meteorite hunter, whose identity remained undisclosed". A small piece of the rock was given to the Shanghai Astronomy Museum to be identified.

It is kept in a private gallery in Arezzo, Italy. Two fragments are kept at the University of Firenze. A sample is also held at the Purple Mountain Observatory in China.

From 8 to 15 July 2025, it was on display at Sotheby's in New York before the live auction on 16 July 2025, where it was expected to sell for between $2-4 million USD, making it the most valuable meteorite ever auctioned at Sotheby's. It was sold for $5.3 million USD to an anonymous buyer.

Niger has launched an investigation into the circumstances of the discovery, export, and sale of the meteorite. The government "expressed doubts about the legality of its export, raising concerns about possible illicit international trafficking". On 8 September 2026, United States Attorney for the District of Columbia Jeanine Pirro announced through her social media channels that the government had seized the meteorite on 16 July 2026 based on 19 U.S.C. § 1595a (Aiding unlawful importation) and was preparing a forfeiture action to acquire government title. Authorities had been unable to identify the lawful owner of the meteorite, and according to United States Customs and Border Protection there was no record of importation into the United States.

== Description ==
The meteorite is classified as a shergottite. It is 24.665 kg, has a gray to brown surface, and is partly covered with fusion crust that is gray to brownish.

=== Petrography ===
The surface has a porphyritic texture. There are olivine phenocrysts with a maximum size of 3 mm that are embedded into a groundmass of maskelynite and ophitic pyroxene. These olivine phenocrysts contain partly crystallized melt inclusions, and the inclusions measure tens of micrometers.

There are also minor phases such as merrillite, ilmenite, chromite, and pyrrhotite. Also observable are shock-melted areas.

=== Geochemistry ===
- Olivine phenocrysts: Mg-rich core (Fo73) to a Fe-rich rim (Fo46)
- Olivine within groundmass: range of Fa35-46
- Olivine average Fe/Mn ratio: 49±3 (N=20)
- Pyroxene: pigeonite (Fs26-31Wo4-8) ranging to augite (Fs18-24Wo22-32)
- Pyroxene average Fe/Mn ratio: 30±3 (N=17)
- Maskelynite composition: An49-52Ab46-49Or1-2 (N=4)

== See also ==
- Allan Hills 84001
- Glossary of meteoritics
- List of Martian meteorites
- Nakhla meteorite
