= List of modern scientists from Shanghai =

Shanghai is the cultural center of the Yangtze Delta Region in China. In the late Ming dynasty, Xu Guangqi played a key role in the introduction of European science to China. Some notable modern scientists from Shanghai are listed below.

Notations

Notations for memberships of academies

- United States of America:
  - Foreign Member/Member of the United States National Academy of Sciences = FM/M-NAS
  - Foreign Member/Member of the United States National Academy of Engineering = FM/M-NAE
  - Foreign Member/Member of the Institute of Medicine of the United States National Academies = FM/M-IM
  - Member/Fellow of the American Academy of Arts and Sciences = M/F-AAAS
  - Member of the New York Academy of Sciences = M-NYAS
- United Kingdom:
  - Fellow of the Royal Society = FRS
  - Fellow of the Royal Academy of Engineering = FRAE
  - Fellow of the British Academy = FBA
  - Fellow of the Royal Society of Edinburgh = FRSE
- Germany:
  - Foreign Member of the German Academy of Sciences Leopoldina = FM-GASL
  - Foreign Member of the Bavarian Academy of Sciences and Humanities = FM-BASH
- France:
  - Foreign Member of the French Academy of Sciences = FM-FAS
- Russia:
  - Foreign Member of the Russian Academy of Sciences = FM-RAS
  - Foreign Member of the Russian Academy of Engineering = FM-RAE
- Republic of China/Taiwan:
  - Academician/Member of the Academia Sinica = M-AS
- People's Republic of China:
  - Foreign Member/Member of the Chinese Academy of Sciences = FM/M-CAS
  - Foreign Member/Member of the Chinese Academy of Engineering = FM/M-CAE
- Other:
  - Member of the Third World Academy of Sciences = M-TWAS
  - Member of the International Academy of Astronautics = M-IAA

Notations for personal profiles

- Priority: Hometown > birthplace > study/work (based on traditional Chinese convention)
- Hometown: h.
- Birthplace: b.
- Have trained/studied in Shanghai: s.
- Have worked in Shanghai: w.

== Hometown Shanghai ==
For most Shanghainese scientists and engineers, their hometowns are in Jiangsu and Zhejiang Provinces.

- Xie Xuejing (h. Shanghai; b. Beijing): M-CAS/TWCS
- Terence Tao (ancestral hometown Shanghai, born Adelaide, Australia): Fields Medal laureate 2006

== Birthplace Shanghai ==
=== United States ===
- Tsung-Dao Lee: Nobel Prize laureate (physics, 1957)
- Chien-Shiung Wu: Wolf Prize winner (physics, 1978)
- Edmond H. Fischer: Nobel Prize laureate (Medicine/Physiology, 1992)
- Charles K. Kao: Nobel Prize laureate (physics, 2009)
- Andrew Yao: Turing Award laureate (2000)
- Norman N. Li: Perkin Medal laureate (2000)
- T. T. Chang: Tyler Prize laureate (1999)
- Ho-Kwang Mao: Balzan Prize laureate (2005)
- Thomas Huang: M-NAE, F-IEEE, F-SPIE, FM-CAS, FM-CAE
- Savio L-Y. Woo: M-IM/NAE
- Shien Biau Woo
- Sinyan Shen
- Leo Radom: M-AAS/IAQMS
- Yu-Chi Ho: M-NAE, LF-IEEE
- Yuen-Ron Shen
- Wei-Liang Chow
- Stephen Z.D. Cheng: M-NAE
- Benjamin Clemens Stone
- Tai Tsun Wu: M-AAAS
- Wen Tsing Chow
- Fujia Yang: M-CAS/TWAS
- Tsung-Ying Shen (沈宗瀛)
- Shan-Fu Shen: M-NAE/AS/IAA
- An Wang
- Taylor Wang
- Albert Allen Bartlett
- Bor S. Luh
- Raphael Tsu
- Robert C. T. Lee

=== Mainland China ===
- Yang Fuyu: M-CAS/TWAS
- Ni Weidou: M-CAE
- Hu Hesheng: M-CAS/TWAS
- He Zuoxiu: M-CAS
- Zhen-yi Wang: M-CAE, FM-FAS
- Wu Wenjun: Shaw Prize laureate (2006)
- Chen Zhu: M-CAS/TWAS, FM-NAS
- Chen Jiaer: M-CAS/TWAS
- Zeng Fanyi
- Zhou Ji: M-CAE

=== Taiwan, Hong Kong, Macau ===
- Lap-Chee Tsui: M-AS, FRS, FRSC, FM-NAS
- Ping-Tse Kao
- Woo Chia-wei: NAS

== See also ==
- Shanghainese people
  - Xu Guangqi
- List of universities and colleges in Shanghai
- List of modern scientists from Jiangsu
- List of modern scientists from Zhejiang
