= Xitang =

Xitang 西塘镇
- Town
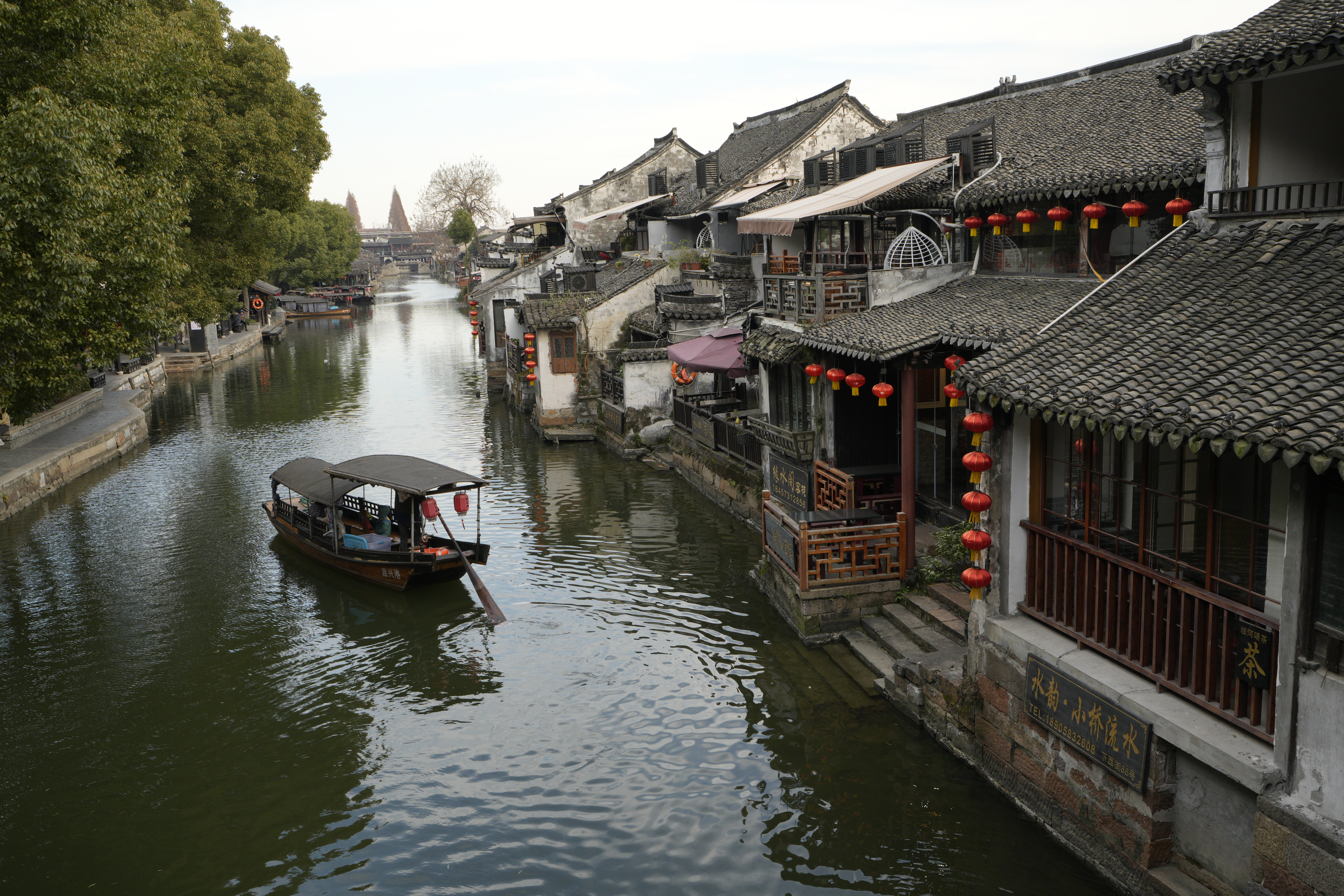
- Xitang

- Location in Zhejiang.
- Coordinates: 30°56′50″N 120°53′20″E
- Country: People's Republic of China
- Province: Zhejiang
- Prefecture-level city: Jiaxing
- County: Jiashan

Area
  - Total: 83.61 km^{2} (32.28 sq mi)

Population (2016)
  - Total: 57,400
  - Density: 687/km^{2} (1,780/sq mi)
- Time zone: UTC+8 (China Standard)
- Postal code: 314102
- Area code: 0573

Xitang (Chinese: 西塘; pinyin: Xītáng; lit. 'West Pond'), formerly known as Xietang (Chinese: 斜塘; lit. 'Oblique Pond'), Pingtang (Chinese: 平塘; lit. 'Flat Pond') and Xutang (Chinese: 胥塘; lit. 'Xu Pond'), is a historic town in Jiashan County, Zhejiang, China. It borders Luxu Town in the north, Yaozhuang Town in the east, Ganyao Town in the southeast, and Tianning Town and Town in the west. As of the 2016 census it had a population of 57,400 and an area of 83.61-square-kilometre (32.28 sq mi). Xitang is a water town crisscrossed by nine rivers. The town stretches across eight sections, linked by old-fashioned stone bridges. In the older parts of town, the buildings are set along the banks of the canals, which serve as the main transportation thoroughfares in the area.

== History ==
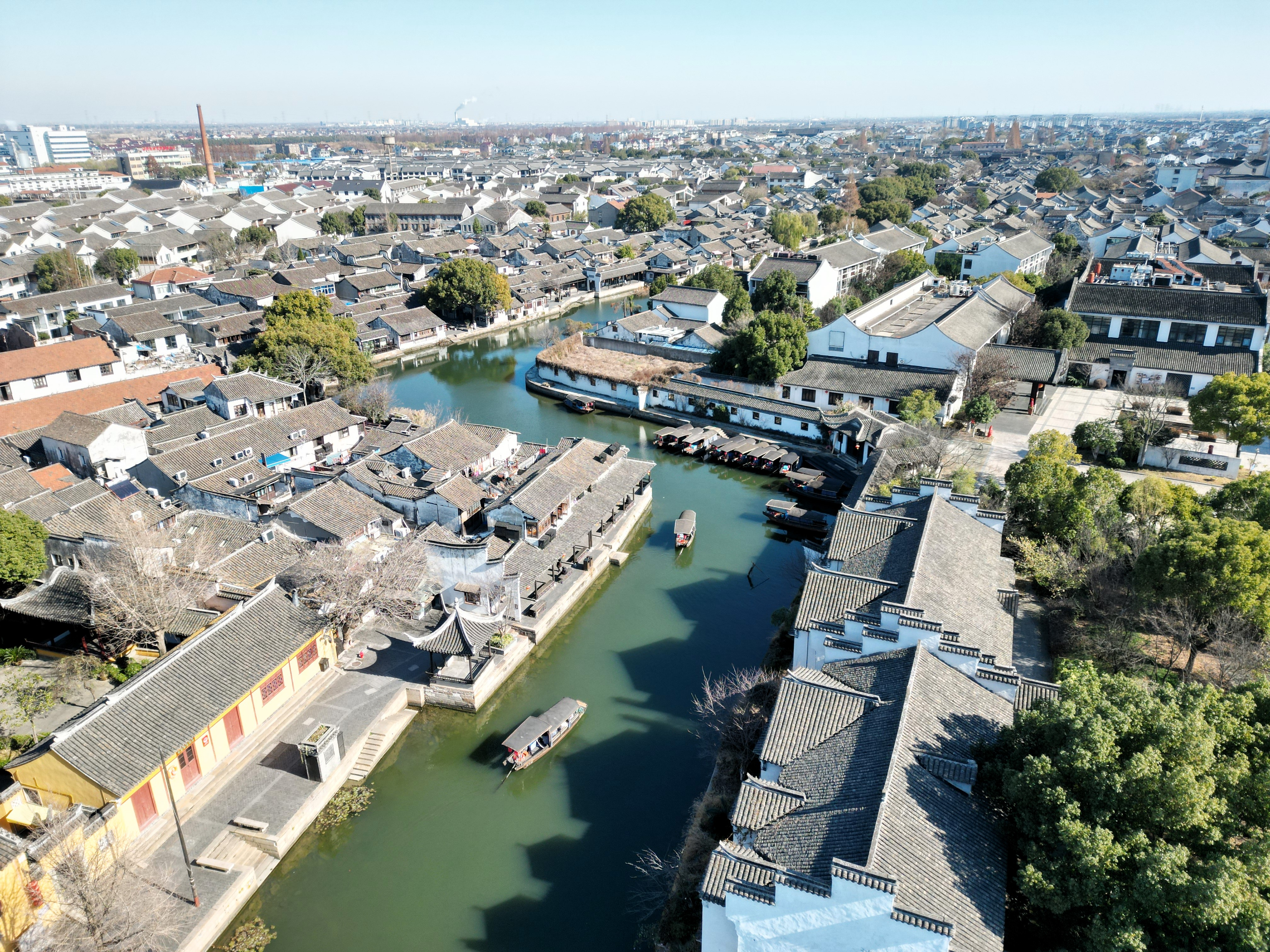
Aerial perspective of Xitang's Canals

Its history dates back to at least the Spring and Autumn period (770 BC–476 BC) when it was located at the border of the State of Yue and Wu. According to legend, Wu Zixu, a well-known scholar and military general, ordered to dig many canals and a pond to facilitate water transportation and to channel water to Jiashan County, and thus Xitang is also called "Xutang".

In 2001 it participated in the selection of World Heritage Site by the United Nations Educational, Scientific and Cultural Organization (UNESCO).

On October 8, 2003, it has been designated as a Historic Towns of China by the National Cultural Heritage Administration and Ministry of Housing and Urban-Rural Development.

In February 2017, it has been categorized as an AAAAA level tourist site by the China National Tourism Administration.

== Administrative division ==
As of 2013, the town is divided into 4 communities 18 villages:

- Chaonandi Community (朝南棣社区)
- Tangdong Community (塘东社区)
- Xijie Community (西街社区)
- Xiyuan Community (西园社区)
- Cuinan (翠南村)
- Dashun (大舜村)
- Dizhao (荻沼村)
- Didian (地甸村)
- Donghui (东汇村)
- Ganshang (邗上村)
- Hechi (荷池村)
- Hongling (红菱村)
- Hualian (华联村)
- Jinming (金明村)
- Limiao (礼庙村)
- Qiandun (茜墩村)
- Shendao (沈道村)
- Xiadianmiao (下甸庙村)
- Xinsheng (新胜村)
- Xingjian (星建村)
- Yaque (鸦鹊村)
- Zhonghu (钟葫村)

== Economy ==
The local economy is primarily based upon agriculture, tourism and local industry. Button production is the most famous in the area. It has 636 button production enterprises, producing more than 1600 kinds of buttons and about 60 billion buttons annually. It is known as "Hometown of Buttons in China" (中国纽扣之乡).

== Attractions ==
Xitang also contains several antique residences and temples, such as the Temple of the Seven Masters. The town's ambience and scenery make it a popular tourist destination. It is frequently depicted in Chinese landscape painting.

The town houses many bridges, lanes and covered corridors, with many of the old streets and lanes retaining their original features. In Xitang, the famous scene is the covered corridors which is nearly 1,000-metre (3,300 ft) long and of simple appearance. It is actually a street with roof. Some sections of the covered corridors are placed in the busiest section, while other are built along the river of streets. Long chairs are arranged along the riverside of some covered corridors for people to have a rest. Most of them are made of bricks and wood and covered by black tiles. There are 122 lanes of varying lengths in Xitang, among which five are over a 100-metre (330 ft) long.

=== Shipi Lane ===
The most distinctive open-air lane is called "Shipi Lane" (Chinese: 石皮弄; lit. 'Stone Skin Lane'). It got its name for the fact that it is flanked by two residential buildings. It was built in late Ming and early Qing dynasties (1368–1911), with 68-metre (223 ft) length and 1-metre (3 ft 3 in) width, and the narrowest point at the entrance is only 0.8-metre (2 ft 7 in) wide. It was paved with 166 stone slabs. The walls on both sides of the lane are 6-to-10-metre (20 to 33 ft) high, and are still intact.

=== Zui Garden ===
The Zui Garden (Chinese: 醉园) is situated at Tawan Street of Xitang and traces its origins to the Ming dynasty (1368–1644). The garden, small and unique, includes a succession of five courtyards, in which delicate rockworks and winding aisles are ingeniously arranged. In the courtyard there is an exquisite tiny bridge made of bricks, which is ornamental and functional but allows only one person to pass through at a time. On the wall opposite the door are carved three Chinese characters "醉经堂; 'The Hall of Intoxicating Books'", from which the garden takes its name. The hall is built by Wang Zhixi (Chinese: 王志熙), a prominent calligrapher and painter in the Qianlong period (1735–1795) of the Qing dynasty (1644–1911), whose works can still be seen in the garden.

== Film and television ==
Xitang locations were featured in the final sequences of the motion picture Mission: Impossible III.

== Transportation ==
The town is connected to two highways: G60 Shanghai-Hangzhou Expressway and S32 Shenjiahu Expressway.

The National Highways G320 and G318 pass across the town.

== Gallery ==
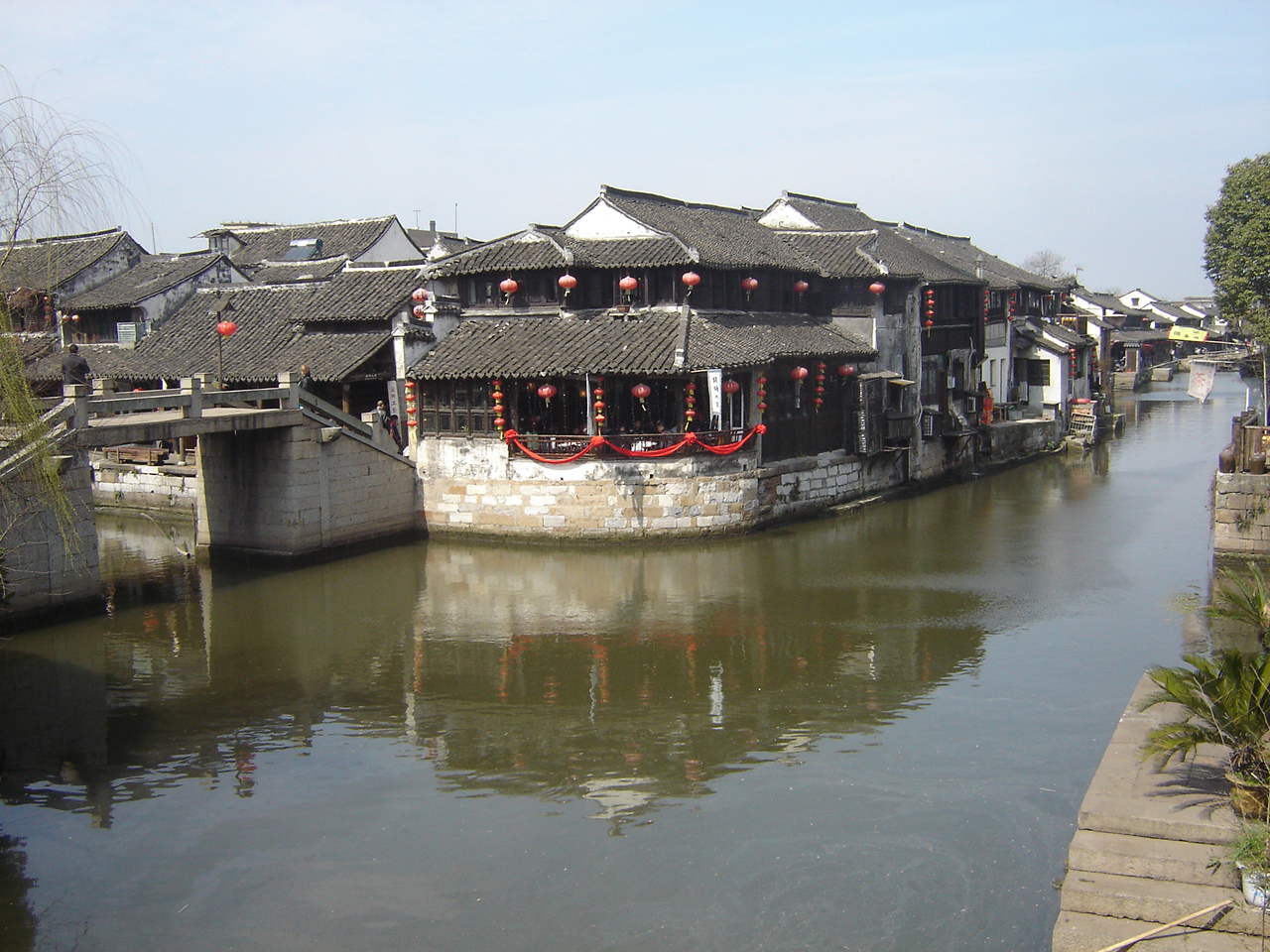

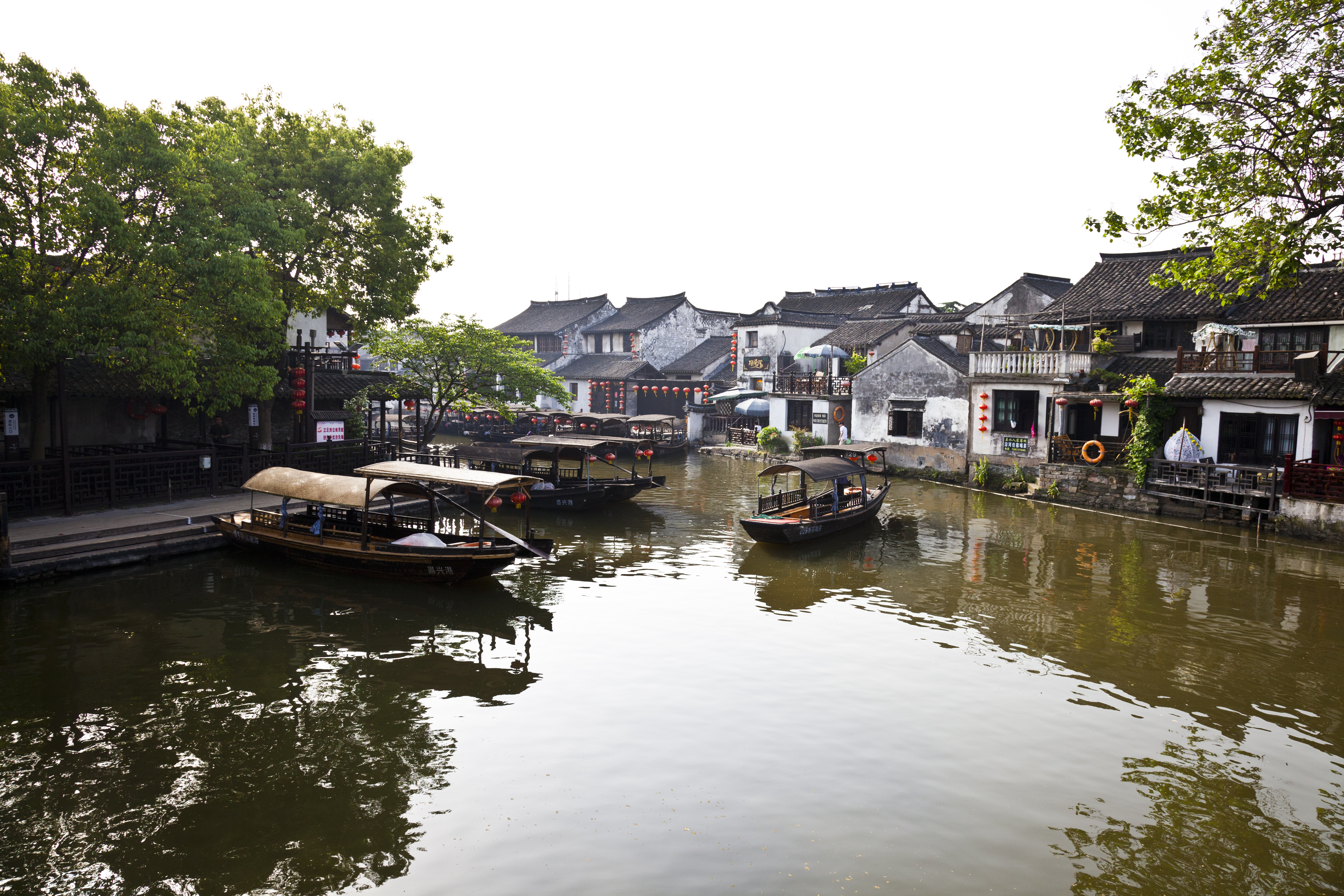

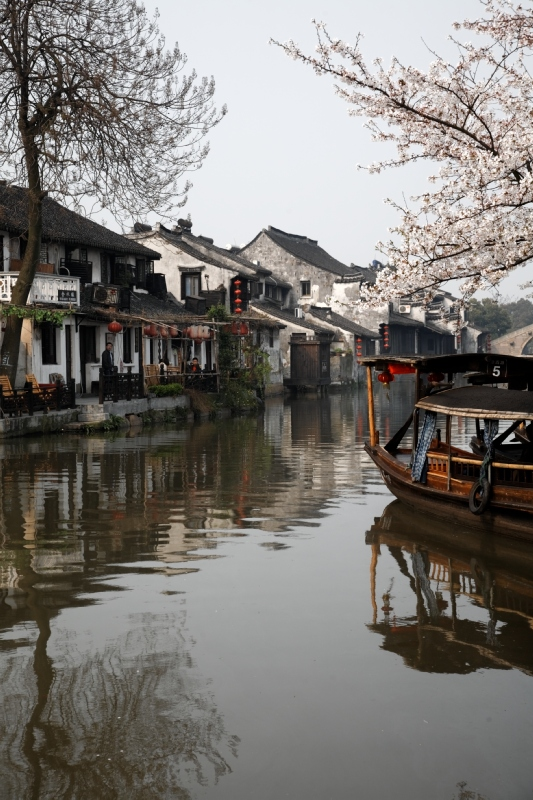

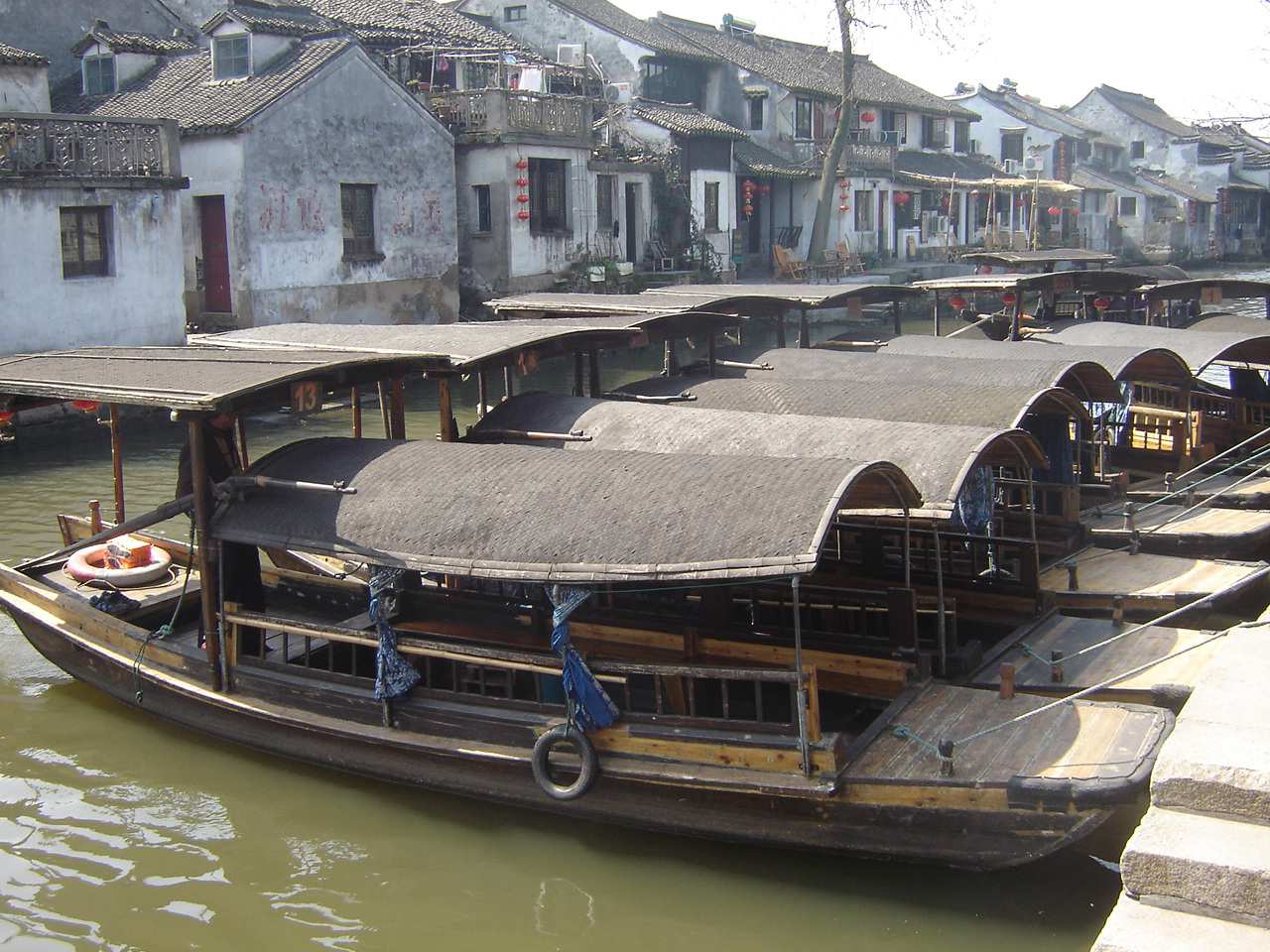

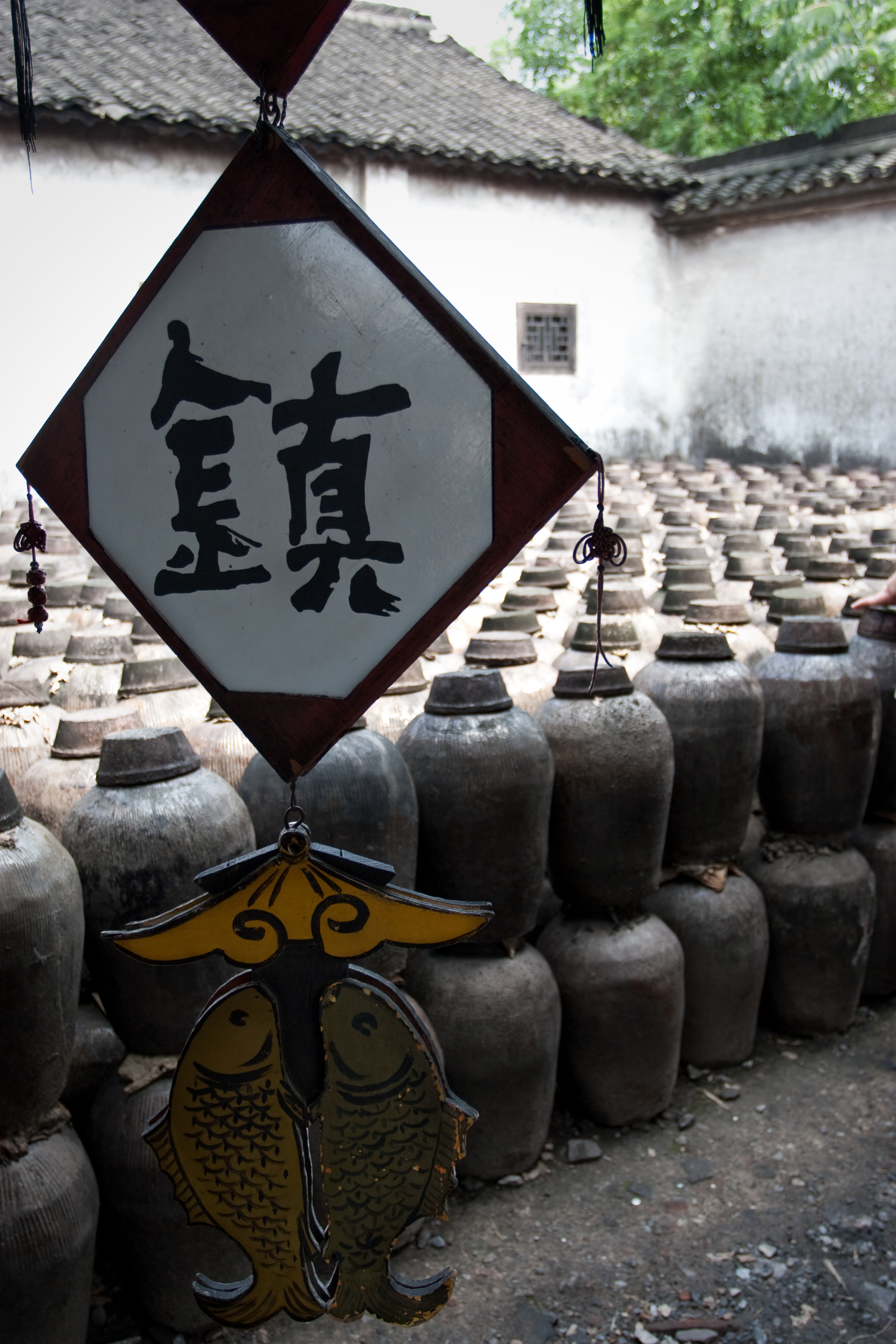
Rice wine storage

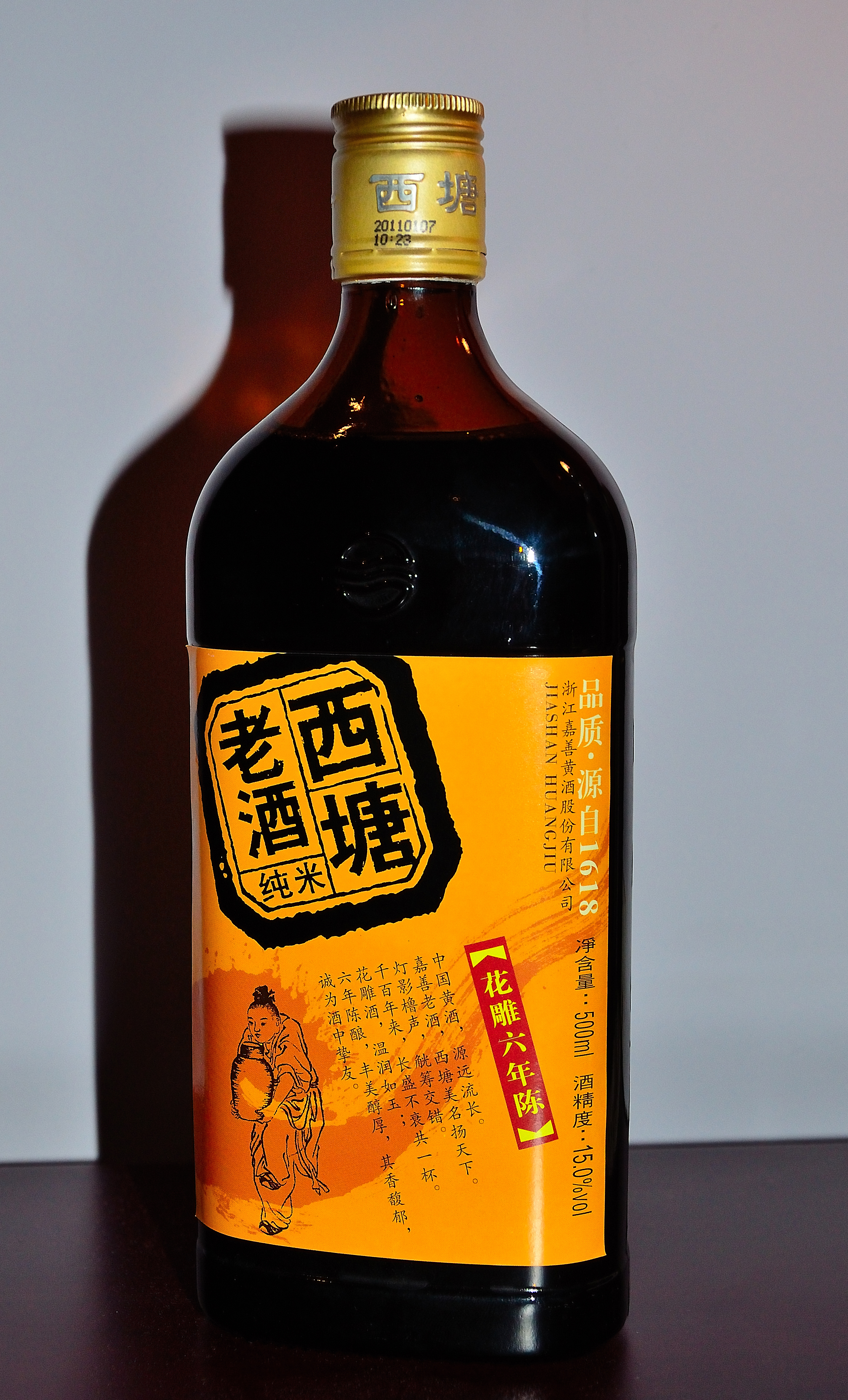
Xitang Huangjiu
