= Chen Chunxian =

Chinese theoretical physicist and businessman (1934–2004)

Chen Chunxian (simplified Chinese: 陈春先; traditional Chinese: 陳春先; pinyin: Chén Chūnxiān; 1934 – 11 August 2004) was a Chinese theoretical physicist and businessman. He was the founder of Zhongguancun in Beijing, often called China's Silicon Valley. He initiated the project to create China's first tokamak device in 1973.

== Biography ==
Chen Chunxian was born in 1934 in Sichuan Province, China. In 1958, he graduated from the Department of Physics of Moscow State University.

From 1959 to 1986, he was a researcher at the Institute of Physics, Chinese Academy of Sciences. He initiated the development of China's first tokamak device and recruited engineer Yan Luguang to the project. In 1973, their collaboration created the CT-6.

In 1979, Chen visited Boston and Silicon Valley in the United States and was greatly impressed. On October 23, 1980, he founded the first non-governmental entity in Zhongguancun, called the "Advanced Technology Service Association". (Only government-run entities can be called "company" in China.)

Chen's company was shut down after an investigation, but he received validation from the central government in 1983, when Hu Yaobang mentioned him in a national statement. Many independent high-tech companies were founded in Zhongguancun, including Lenovo.

In his later years, Chen lived in poor conditions and without health care. He died on 11 August 2004.
