= Ningbo University =

Public university in Ningbo, Zhejiang, China

- 宁波大学
- Motto: 实事求是 经世致用
- Type: Public
- Established: 1986; 40 years ago
- President: Cai Ronggen
- Academic staff: 2,300
- Students: 25,000
- Location: Ningbo, Zhejiang, China
- Campus: Urban, 5.3 km^{2}
- Website: nbu.edu.cn

Ningbo University
- Simplified Chinese: 宁波大学
- Traditional Chinese: 寧波大學
Transcriptions
Standard Mandarin
- Hanyu Pinyin: Níngbō Dàxué

Ningbo University (NBU; 宁波大学) is a municipal public university in Jiangbei, Ningbo, Zhejiang, China. It is affiliated with the Ningbo Municipal People's Government. The university is part of the Double First-Class Construction.

== History ==
The first president was Academician Zhu Zhaoxiang, serving from September 1985 to September 1988. Academician Yan Luguang served as president from 1999 to 2004.

In 2024, Academic Ranking of World Universities ranked Ningbo University within the 401-500 band globally and 78 nationally.
