= Taozhuang =

Town in Zhejiang, China

Taozhuang is a town of Jiashan County, Zhejiang Province, China. Located in the northwest of the county, Taozhuang is famous for Lake Fenhu and its steel market.

== History ==
=== Name ===
Taozhuang was known as Liuxi (柳溪). During the Shaoxing Era of the reign of the Emperor Gaozong of Song (1131 - 1162), an officer called Tao Wenwo (陶文斡) migrated here from Suzhou and built a manor house, so the name changed to Taozhuang.

=== Recent ===
Fenyu was merged with Taozhuang in 1999.

== Administration ==
Taozhuang is divided into 1 community, 9 villages and 1 Farms.

- Taozhuang (陶庄)
- Taozhong (陶中)
- Jinhu (金湖)
- Hubin (湖滨)
- Fenyu (汾玉)
- Fenhu (汾湖)
- Fennan (汾南)
- Lisheng (利生)
- Xiangsheng (翔胜)

== Economy ==
=== Transport ===
- The county road Ping-Li (Pinghu to Lili) Road is across the town from east to west.
- The Chang-Jia High Way (Changshu to Jiaxing) is being built.
- The River Taipu(太浦河) is in the north, through Lake Fenhu, which can reach the Great Canal and Huangpu River.
