= Lu Chih-houng =

Lu Chih-houng (Chinese: 陸志鴻; pinyin: Lù Zhìhóng; Wade–Giles: Lu Chih-hung; 1897–1973), courtesy name Youhai (筱海), was a Chinese/Taiwanese educator, metallographist, materials scientist and engineer.

== Biography ==
Lu was born into a prominent family in Jiaxing, Zhejiang, Qing dynasty. His family were descendants of Tang dynasty Chancellor Lu Zhi. His father was former President of Zhejiang Provincial Library (浙江省立圖書館).

Lu graduated from Tokyo Imperial University (currently the University of Tokyo) ranked first in his engineering class. Lu and went back to China after graduation in 1924, and joined the faculty of Nanjing Engineering College (root of current Southeast University). In 1927, Lu became a professor of civil engineering of the original National Central University (now called Nanjing University). Lu was the dean of engineering faculty of the National Central University.

In 1945, Lu was sent to take-over the Taihoku Imperial University (now National Taiwan University) after the surrender of Japan at the end of World War II. In July 1946, Lu became the second President of the National Taiwan University (NTU), after Lo Tsung-lo.

Lu led the manufacture of first 99.9999999%-pure semiconductor germanium in Taiwan, helping build a solid foundation for later successful semiconductor industries of Taiwan. Lu died in Taipei on May 4, 1973. A hall in the NTU is named after him, nearby there's a bronze statue built in his honour.
