= Sanguantang Bridge =

Sanguantang Bridge 三官塘桥
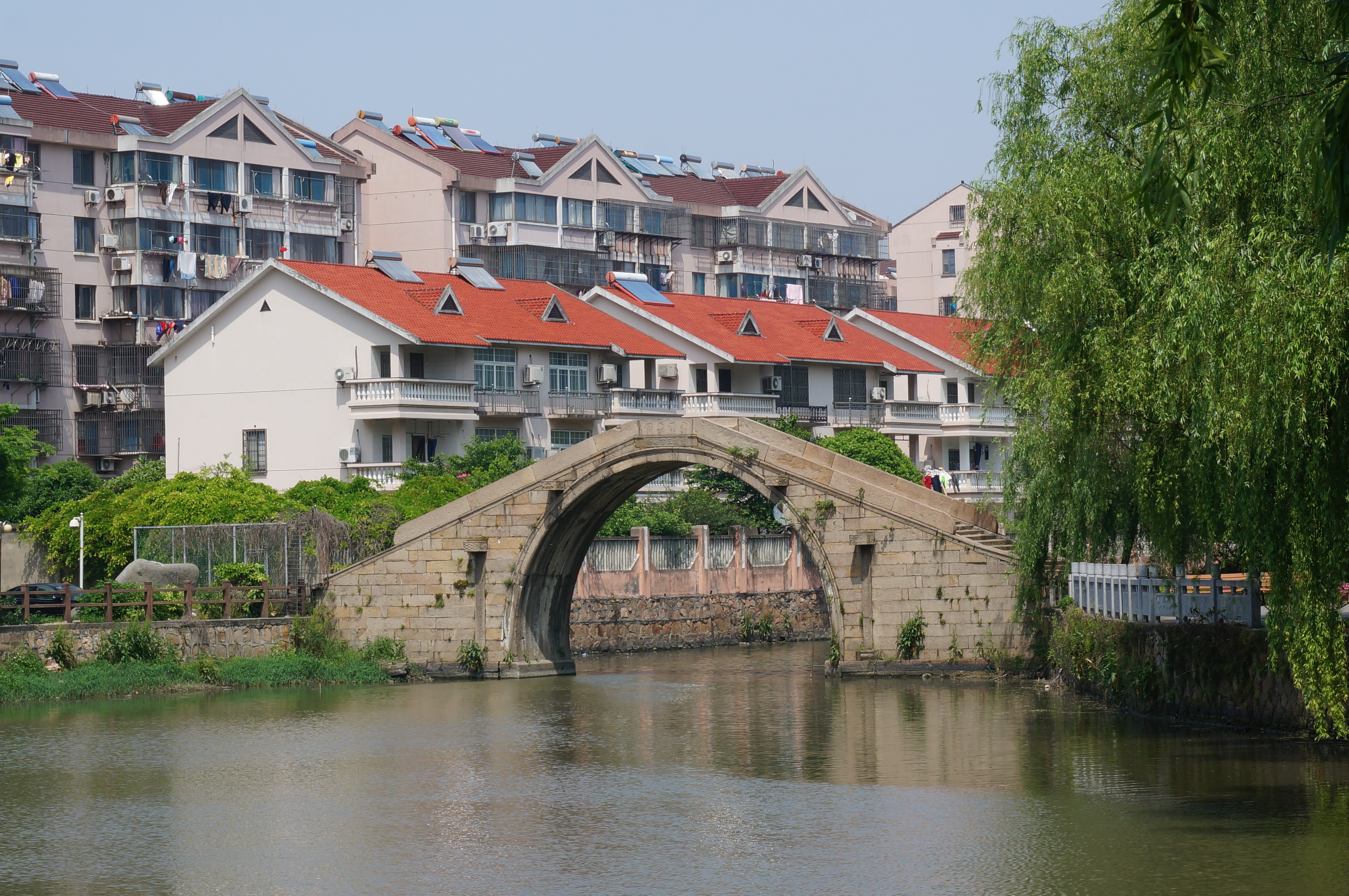
- The Sanguantang Bridge in May 2015.
- Coordinates: 30°29′19″N 120°43′11″E
- Locale: Luoxing Subdistrict, Jiashan County, Zhejiang, China

Characteristics
- Design: Arch Bridge
- Material: Stone
- Total length: 32 metres (105 ft)
- Width: 2.8 metres (9 ft 2 in)
- Height: 7.5 metres (25 ft)
- Longest span: 9.6 metres (31 ft)

History
- Construction start: 1574
- Construction end: 1868 (reconstruction)

Sanguantang Bridge (simplified Chinese: 三官塘桥; traditional Chinese: 三官塘橋; pinyin: Sānguāntáng Qiáo) is a historic stone arch bridge in Luoxing Subdistrict, Jiashan County, Zhejiang, China.

== History ==
The bridge was originally built in 1574, in the ruling of Wanli Emperor in the Ming dynasty (1368–1644). It name comes from a nearby temple named Sanguantang Temple (三官堂庙). It was completely destroyed in 1860, during the reign of Xianfeng Emperor in the Qing dynasty (1644–1911). Eight years later, it was rebuilt in the original site. In December 1986, it was designated as a cultural relic protection unit at county level by the local government.

== Architecture ==
The bridge measures 32 metres (105 ft) long, 2.8 metres (9 ft 2 in) wide, and approximately 7.5 metres (25 ft) high.
