= Yan Luguang =

Chinese electrical engineer (born 1935)

Yan Luguang (Chinese: 严陆光; born 6 July 1935) is a Chinese electrical engineer. He is a research professor and former Director of the Institute of Electrical Engineering of the Chinese Academy of Sciences (CAS), and served as President of Ningbo University from 1999 to 2004. He is an academician of the CAS and The World Academy of Sciences, and a foreign member of the National Academy of Sciences of Ukraine. Together with physicist Chen Chunxian, he led the development and construction of China's first tokamak.

== Biography ==
Yan was born on 6 July 1935 in Beijing, with his ancestral home in Dongyang, Zhejiang. In 1954, he and his older brother Yan Wuguang (严武光) together went to study in the Soviet Union. He graduated from the Moscow Power Engineering Institute in 1959.

After returning to China, Yan joined the newly established Institute of Electrical Engineering of the Chinese Academy of Sciences (CAS). In the early 1970s, Yan joined physicist Chen Chunxian to lead the development and construction of China's first tokamak, an electromagnetic device used in nuclear fusion. Their cooperation achieved success in 1973, with the creation of the tokamak CT-6. Yan also participated in the design of the next tokamak device, the Hefei CT-8.

From 1988 to 1999, Yan served as Director of the Institute of Electrical Engineering. He led research in superconductivity, maglev trains, renewable energy, and electric cars. He was elected an academician of the CAS in 1991.

On the recommendation of Lu Yongxiang, the president of the CAS, Yan was appointed President of Ningbo University in 1999. He served in the position until 2004.

== Family ==
Yan is the youngest son of Yan Jici, a founder of modern physics in China, and his wife Zhang Zongying (张宗英). He has four older brothers, not counting three other siblings who died in infancy. The five Yan brothers all became academics, including Yan Youguang (严又光), the main designer of China's first digital computer, Yan Shuangguang (严双光), an aircraft designer, and Yan Wuguang, a professor at the CAS Institute of High Energy Physics. The Yan family has been called the "little academy of science".

Yan is married to Lü Xi'en (吕锡恩), a graduate of the University of Leningrad and an associate professor at the CAS Institute of Chemistry.
