= Shanghai Astronomy Museum =

Planetarium in Shanghai, China

Coordinates: 30.915094°N 121.922670°E

Shanghai Astronomy Museum is a planetarium opened in 2021 in Lingang New City, Pudong New Area district, Shanghai. Its dome covers 38,000 square meters. It is the world's largest planetarium in terms of building scale. The planetarium, designed by New York City based Ennead Architects, serves as an educational and entertainment site for visitors. It is part of Shanghai Science and Technology Museum.

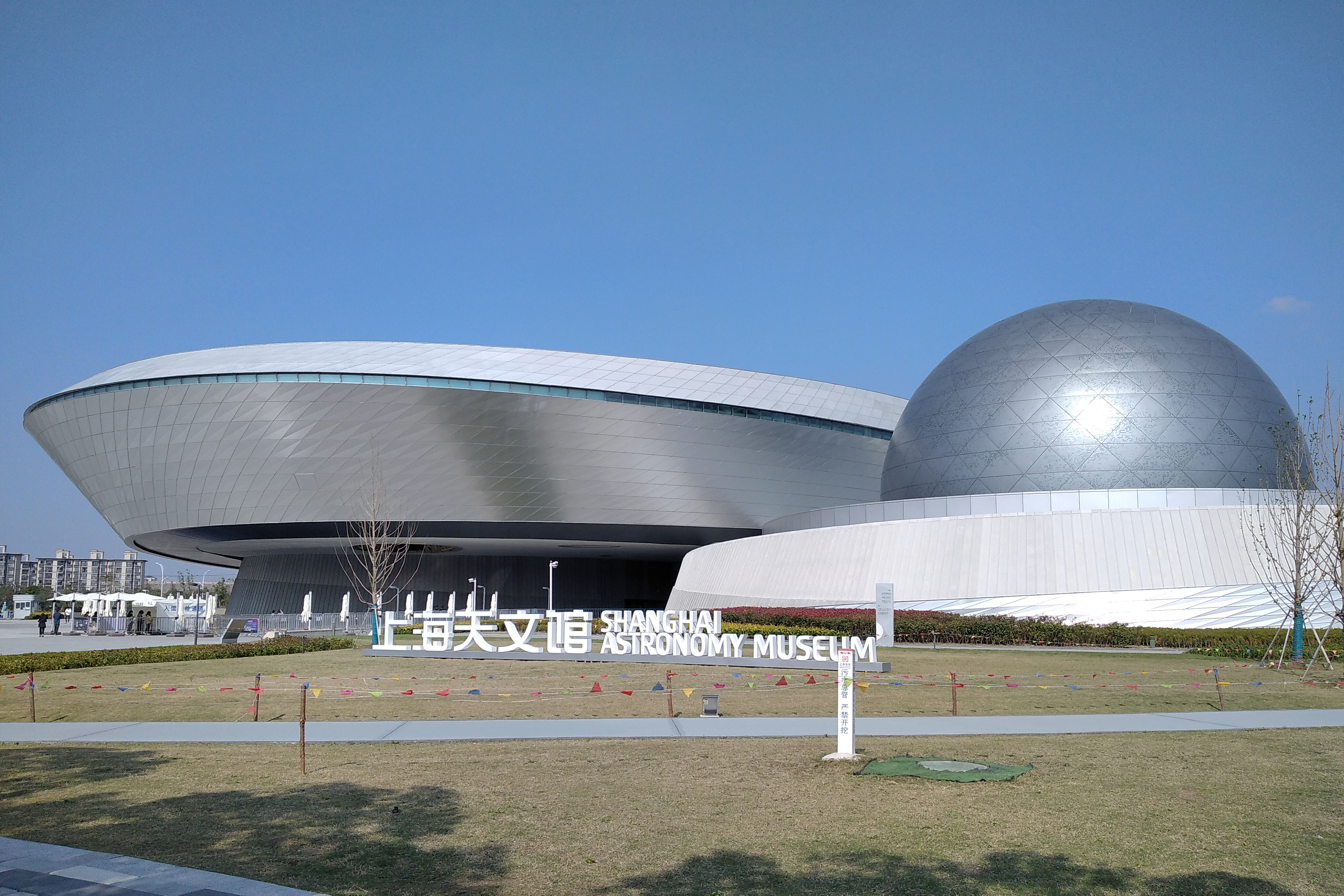
Shanghai Astronomy Museum

With no straight lines or right angles, the building was designed to reflect the shapes, movement and geometry of the universe. Ennead Architects design partner, Thomas J Wong, explained that the foundational design concept of the museum was to "abstractly embody within the architecture some of the fundamental laws of astrophysics, which are the rule in space."

== See also ==
- List of planetariums
