= Shen Tianhui =

Chinese chemist

Shen Tianhui (Chinese: 沈天慧; 27 April 1923 – 2 January 2011) was a Chinese chemist. She was a professor at Shanghai Jiao Tong University. She was an academician of the Chinese Academy of Sciences.

== Biography ==
Shen was born in Jiashan, Zhejiang Province, and graduated from the department of chemical engineering of Utopia University in Shanghai in 1949. From 1957 to 1959, She studied in the Soviet Union and her research focus was semiconductor materials. In the 1960s, she held a position at the Changchun Institute of Applied Chemistry of the Chinese Academy of Sciences (CAS), studying the purification of silica material. From 1966 to 1986, she was in the No. 771 Institute, affiliated to the Ministry of Aerospace Industry in Lintong County, Shaanxi Province, doing research in semiconductor materials and large-scale integrated electronic circuits. Since 1987, she has been studying magnetic storage at the information storage research center at Shanghai Jiao Tong University.

Shen was a member of academic committee of SJTU, an advisor of Research Institute of Materials and Chemical Engineering of SJTU, and director of academic committee of Key Laboratory of Micro-Nano-Manufacturing Technology. Shen was elected an academician of Chinese Academy of Sciences in 1980.
