= Zhu Zhaoxiang =

Chinese engineer

Zhu Zhaoxiang (Chinese: 朱兆祥; 1921 – 28 November 2011), also known as Zhao-xiang Zhu, was a Chinese engineer, educator and a pioneer of explosive mechanics in China. He was the first President of Ningbo University.

== Biography ==
On February 4, 1921, Zhu was born in Zhenhai County (current Zhenhai District), Ningbo, Zhejiang Province. Both his father and grandfather were fishermen. In 1949, Zhu graduated from the Department of Civil Engineering, Zhejiang University. In the early 1940s, Zhu joined the Chinese Communist Party (CCP). From 1944 to 1949, Zhu was a lecturer and assistant in the Department of Civil Engineering, Zhejiang University.

In 1957, because of his right-wing political views and statements, Zhu was expelled from the CCP. Zhu was reaccepted and rejoined the party in the Deng Xiaoping era. From 1959 to 1988, Zhu taught mechanics at the University of Science and Technology of China (USTC); he was a lecturer, associate professor, professor, and the leader of explosive mechanics research at USTC, in chronological order. From 1985 to 1988, Zhu served as the first President of Ningbo University. Since 1989, Zhu continued his position at the Institute of Mechanics, Chinese Academy of Sciences as a senior researcher.
