= Zhang Zhongjun =

Chinese electrical engineer

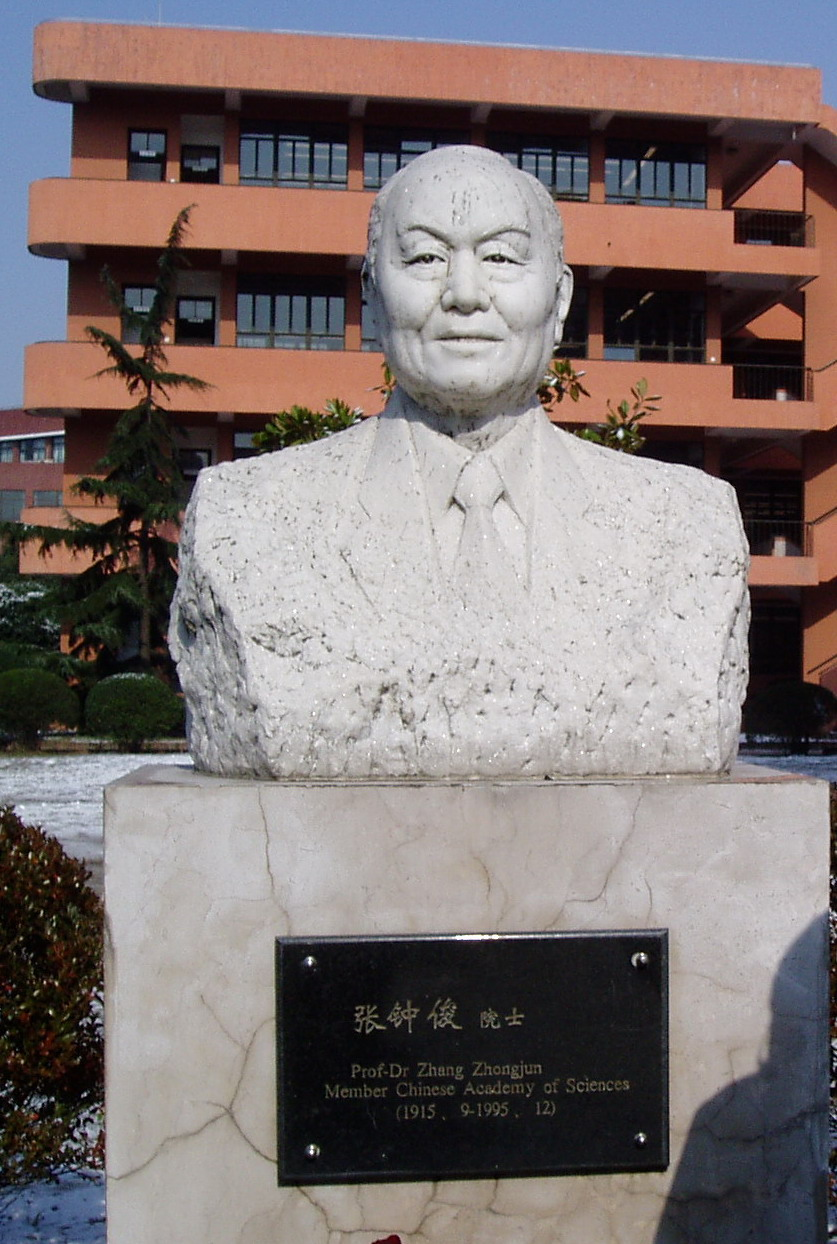
Statue of Zhang Zhongjun at Shanghai Jiao Tong University

Zhang Zhongjun (Chinese: 张仲俊; 1913–1995), also known as Tsun-Tsing Chang or T.T. Chang, was a Chinese electrical engineer and a member of the Chinese Academy of Sciences.

== Biography ==
Zhang was born in Jiashan, Zhejiang Province in 1913. He attended Shanghai Jiao Tong University and was awarded a BSE (electrical engineering) in 1934. Upon graduation he set out to the United States to continue his studies at the Massachusetts Institute of Technology and was awarded a S.M. (Science Master) within 9 months, and SC.D.(Doctor of Science) in Electrical Engineering and minor in mathematics in 1938. He was a Rockefeller Scholar and stayed on as a postdoctoral researcher at MIT, after completing his studies.

As World War II broke out he followed the Nationalist Government to Wuhan and Chongqing. He taught graduate classes at the National Central University until the end of war.

Zhang returned to and worked in the Department of Electrical Engineering at Shanghai Jiao Tong University from 1945. He was head of Electrical Engineering department and director of Electrical Research Institute. Jiang Zemin, later General Secretary of the Chinese Communist Party (paramount leader of China), was one of his students.

He was advising the Shanghai Power Company and worked on the restoration of power outage from Nationalist Chinese air raid and Naval blockade. In the 1950s, he designed and established the electric power simulation system of Shanghai. In the mid-1950s he was a delegate of China to Soviet Union on electrical power research. After the 1960s his interest turned to the field of control engineering and founded Department of Automation & cybernatics at Shanghai Jiao Tong University. He was elected a member of the Chinese Academy of Sciences in 1980.
