= Liu Yuanfang =

Chinese nuclear chemist

Liu Yuanfang (Chinese: 刘元方; born February 1931) is a Chinese nuclear chemist. He is a chemist at the Chinese Academy of Sciences (CAS), who is now Professor of Chemistry at Shanghai University. He has studied nuclear chemistry and radiochemistry for forty years and pioneered education in that field in China.
