= Jiashan County =

Jiashan 嘉善县 Kashan
- County
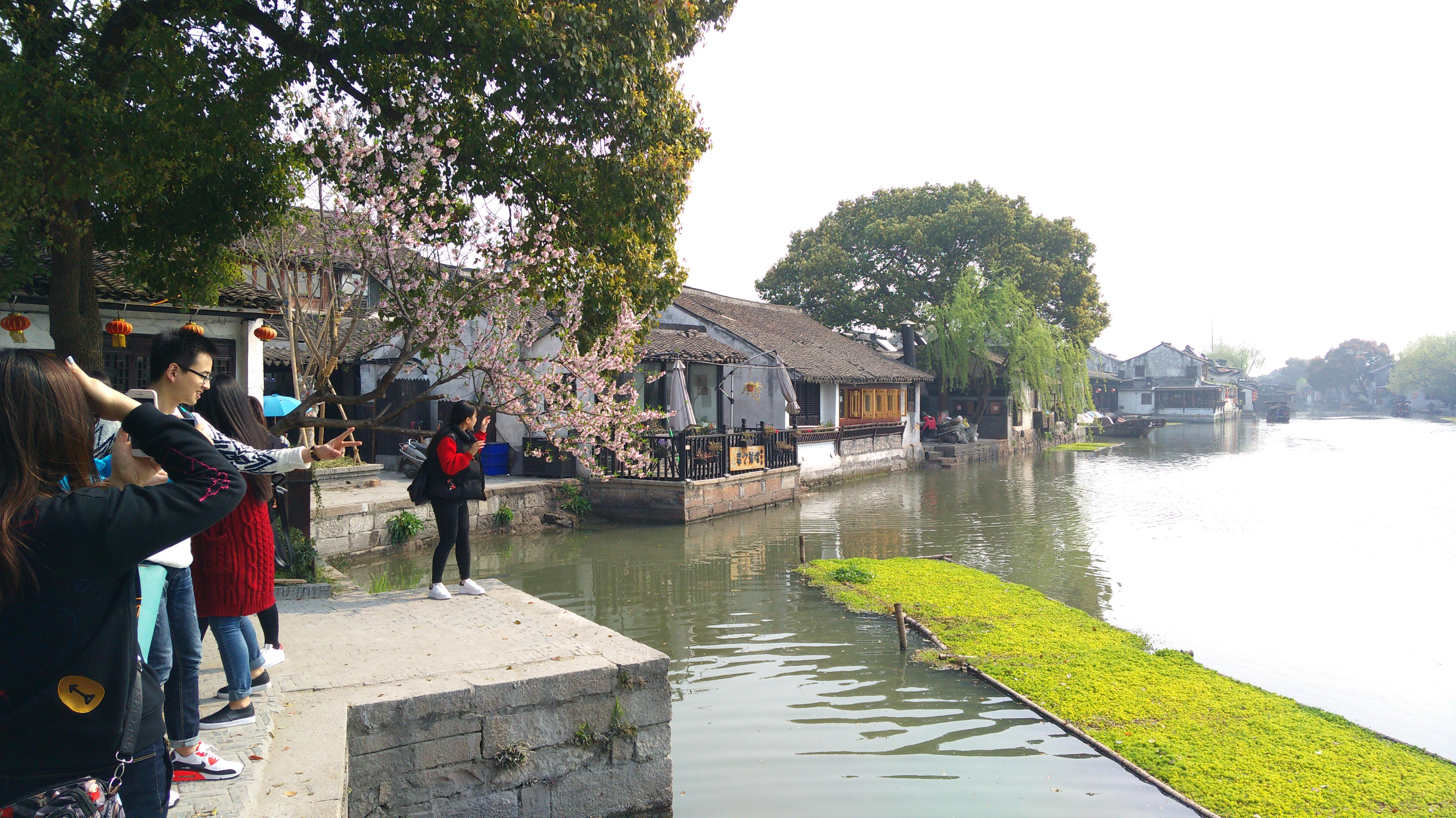
- Jiashan

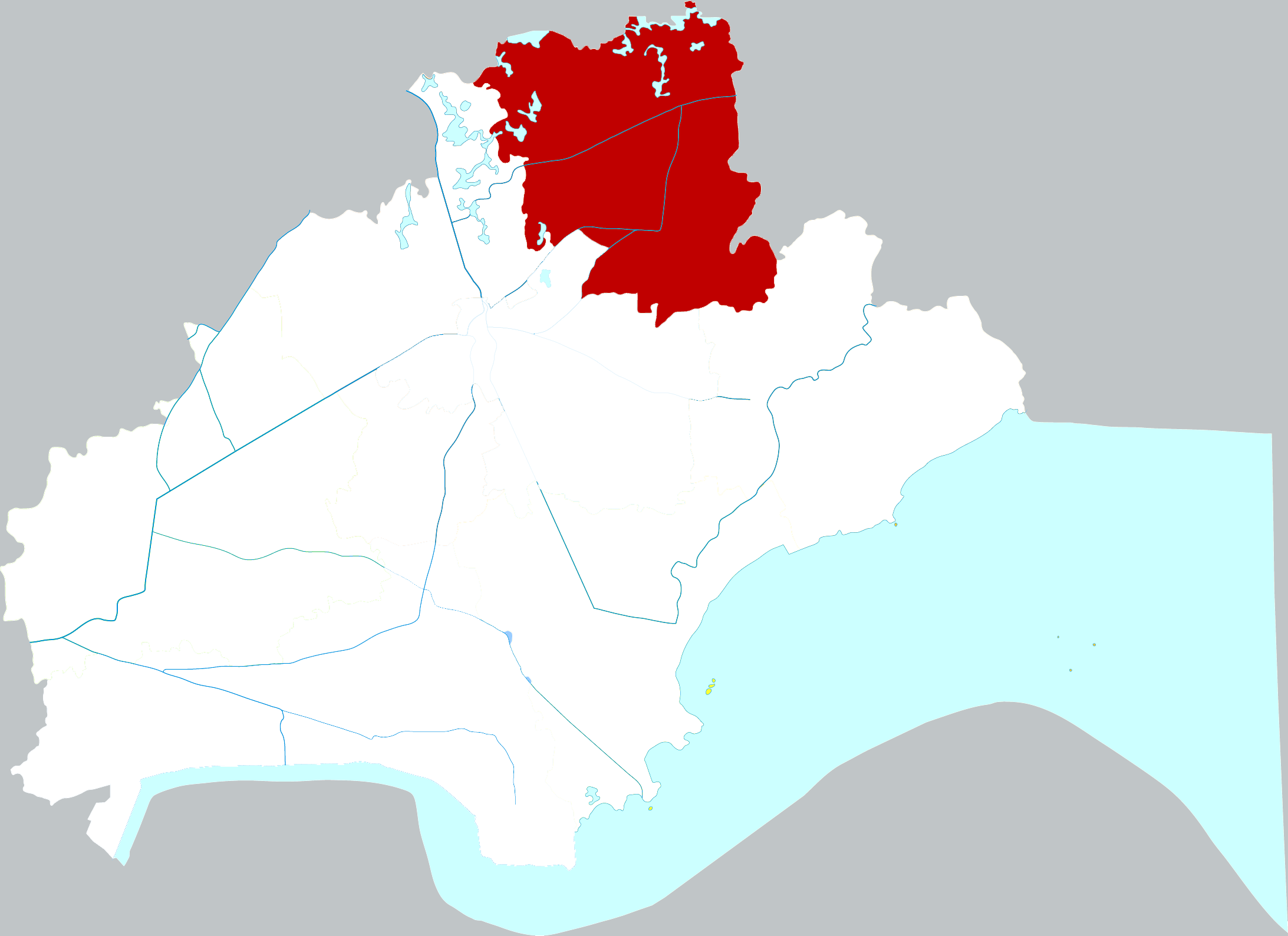
- Location of Jiashan County within Jiaxing

- Location of the seat in Zhejiang
- Coordinates: 30°49′52″N 120°55′34″E
- Country: People's Republic of China
- Province: Zhejiang
- Prefecture-level city: Jiaxing

Area
  - Total: 506.88 km^{2} (195.71 sq mi)

Population (2020)
  - Total: 648,160
  - Density: 1,278.7/km^{2} (3,311.9/sq mi)
- Time zone: UTC+8 (China Standard)

Jiashan County (simplified Chinese: 嘉善县; traditional Chinese: 嘉善縣; pinyin: Jiāshàn Xiàn) is a county in the north of Zhejiang Province, bordering Shanghai to the northeast and Jiangsu province to the north. It is administered by the prefecture-level city of Jiaxing. Jiashan is nicknamed "The Land of Fish and Rice", and is 80 km (50 mi) southwest of central Shanghai, 95 km (59 mi) east of Hangzhou, and 90 km (56 mi) south of Suzhou. The county seat is located on 126 People Avenue, Weitang Town.

The second campus of Sanda University, known as Guangbiao Institute, is located in Jiashan County.

== History ==
Jiashan formerly was part of Jiaxing. In 1430, Jiashan was established.

On 1 November 2022, the county was named by a guideline of the National Development and Reform Commission (NDRC) as a "leading trial area" for common prosperity.

== Administration divisions ==
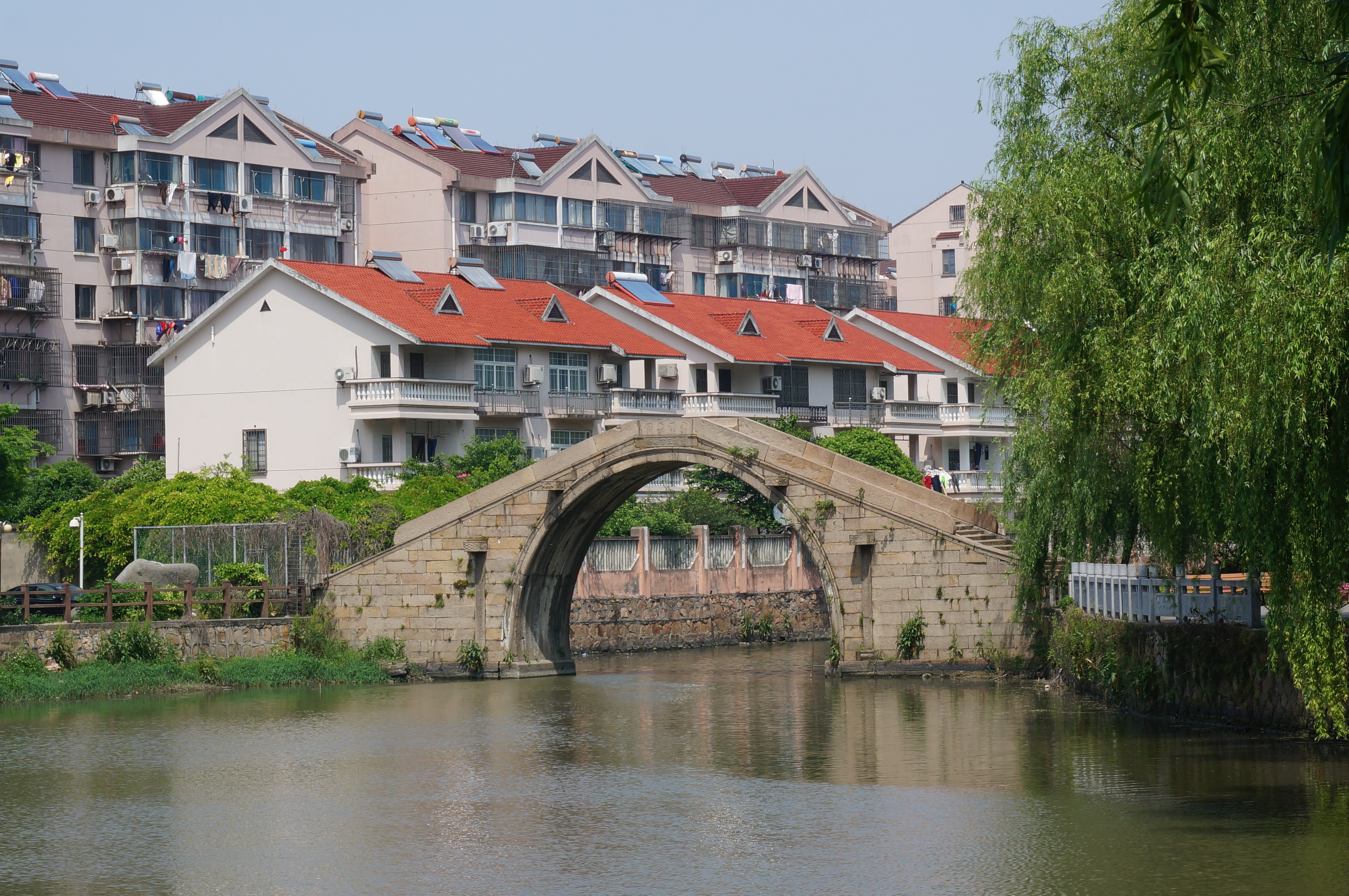
Sanguantang Bridge in Luoxing subdistrict.

Jiashan County consists of six towns, three subdistricts, 11 communities, 16 residential zones and 164 administrative villages.

=== Subdistricts ===
- Weitang (Former Weitang, Lize, Fengnan)
- Luoxing
- Huimin (Former Huimin, Datong)

=== Towns ===
- Northwest: Taozhuang (Former Taozhuang, Fenyu)
- North: Xitang (Former Xitang, Dashun, Xiadianmiao)
- Northeast: Yaozhuang (Former Yaozhuang, Dingzha, Yuhui)
- Southwest: Tianning (Former Tianning, Hongxi, Yangmiao)
- Centre: Ganyao (Former Ganyao, Fanjing)
- South: Dayun

== Climate ==
Climate data for Jiashan, elevation 3 m (9.8 ft), (1991–2020 normals, extremes 1981–present)
Month	Jan	Feb	Mar	Apr	May	Jun	Jul	Aug	Sep	Oct	Nov	Dec	Year
Record high °C (°F)	22.5 (72.5)	27.4 (81.3)	31.9 (89.4)	33.7 (92.7)	35.6 (96.1)	38.1 (100.6)	40.0 (104.0)	40.2 (104.4)	37.2 (99.0)	36.0 (96.8)	29.4 (84.9)	23.7 (74.7)	40.2 (104.4)
Mean daily maximum °C (°F)	8.4 (47.1)	10.6 (51.1)	14.8 (58.6)	20.8 (69.4)	25.8 (78.4)	28.4 (83.1)	33.0 (91.4)	32.4 (90.3)	28.4 (83.1)	23.4 (74.1)	17.6 (63.7)	11.2 (52.2)	21.2 (70.2)
Daily mean °C (°F)	4.5 (40.1)	6.3 (43.3)	10.2 (50.4)	15.7 (60.3)	20.9 (69.6)	24.4 (75.9)	28.8 (83.8)	28.4 (83.1)	24.3 (75.7)	18.9 (66.0)	13.1 (55.6)	6.9 (44.4)	16.9 (62.4)
Mean daily minimum °C (°F)	1.4 (34.5)	2.9 (37.2)	6.5 (43.7)	11.7 (53.1)	17.0 (62.6)	21.4 (70.5)	25.6 (78.1)	25.4 (77.7)	21.2 (70.2)	15.3 (59.5)	9.4 (48.9)	3.4 (38.1)	13.4 (56.2)
Record low °C (°F)	−7.6 (18.3)	−6.6 (20.1)	−3.9 (25.0)	0.3 (32.5)	8.5 (47.3)	13.2 (55.8)	18.4 (65.1)	18.1 (64.6)	12.4 (54.3)	2.4 (36.3)	−2.3 (27.9)	−8.9 (16.0)	−8.9 (16.0)
Average precipitation mm (inches)	76.6 (3.02)	73.0 (2.87)	107.6 (4.24)	90.0 (3.54)	106.0 (4.17)	212.8 (8.38)	138.0 (5.43)	176.1 (6.93)	98.6 (3.88)	59.2 (2.33)	61.5 (2.42)	54.3 (2.14)	1,253.7 (49.35)
Average precipitation days (≥ 0.1 mm)	11.7	11.2	13.6	12.4	12.2	15.1	11.6	12.8	10.2	7.8	10.1	9.1	137.8
Average snowy days	2.7	1.9	0.6	0.1	0	0	0	0	0	0	0.2	1.0	6.5
Average relative humidity (%)	77	76	76	74	75	82	79	79	79	77	78	75	77
Mean monthly sunshine hours	115.5	116.9	143.1	167.0	177.5	140.7	219.1	216.8	173.7	166.1	132.0	130.8	1,899.2
Percentage possible sunshine	36	37	38	43	42	33	51	53	47	47	42	42	43
Source: China Meteorological Administration All-time September high All-time October high

== Economy ==
=== Transportation ===
==== Road ====
- G320
- Shen-Jia-Hu High Way
- Hu-Hang High Way
- Ping-Li County Road
- Chang-Jia High Way

==== Railway ====
- Hu-Kun Railway
- Hu-Hang High Railway

==== Water ====
- Hongqitang Canel
- Luxutang Canel
- Taipu River

== Culture ==
=== Education ===
- Jiashan Senior High School
- Jiashan Second Senior High School
- Jiashan High School

=== Notable people ===
- Wu Zhen, a painter in Yuan Dynasty
- Qian Nengxun, a premier of the Republic of China
- Sun Daolin, a renowned Chinese actor
- Huang Ju, Mayor and Party chief of Shanghai, Vice-Premier of the People's Republic of China

== See also ==
- Xitang
