= Yang Fuyu =

Chinese biologist (1927–2023)

- 杨福愉
- Born: 30 October 1927; Shanghai, China
- Died: 5 January 2023 (aged 95); Beijing, China
- Education: Zhejiang University; Moscow State University
- Scientific career
- Fields: Biochemistry
- Workplaces: Institute of Biophysics, Chinese Academy of Sciences

Chinese name
- Simplified Chinese: 杨福愉
- Traditional Chinese: 楊福愉
Transcriptions
Standard Mandarin
- Hanyu Pinyin: Yáng Fúyú

Yang Fuyu (Chinese: 杨福愉; 30 October 1927 – 5 January 2023) was a Chinese biochemist, biophysicist and writer. He was the main founder of biomembrane study in China. He served as chief of the National Laboratory of Biomacromolecules, Institute of Biophysics, Chinese Academy of Sciences.

== Life ==
Yang was a native of Ningbo, Zhejiang, and was born in Shanghai in 1927. He graduated from the Department of Chemistry, Zhejiang University in 1950. Just after his graduation, he worked for the Institute of Experimental Biology, Chinese Academy of Sciences (CAS) as an assistant.

In 1956, Yang went to USSR and studied at the Department of Biology, Moscow State University until 1960 when he received a PhD there.

Yang was a long-serving senior scientist at the Institute of Biophysics, Chinese Academy of Sciences. He was also a professor of the institute, a professor of the Graduate School, University of Science and Technology of China and a professor at Wuhan University.

Yang died on 5 January 2023 in Beijing, at the age of 95.

== Academic positions ==
- Academician, Chinese Academy of Sciences (elected 1991)
- General secretary (1993–1997), Chinese Biochemical Society
- Vice-president (1982–1984, 1993–1997), Chinese Biochemical Society
- Editor-in-chief, Acta Biophysica Sinica

== Family ==
Yang's younger brother was the nuclear physicist Yang Fujia.
