= Ni Weidou =

Ni Weidou (simplified Chinese: 倪维斗; traditional Chinese: 倪維斗; pinyin: Ní Wéidòu; born October 6, 1932, in Zhenhai, Ningbo, Zhejiang) is a Chinese mechanical and thermodynamical scientist and engineer.

== Career ==
Ni's hometown is Zhenhai District, Ningbo, Zhejiang province. Ni entered Tsinghua University in 1951. Ni was transferred to the Bauman Moscow State Technical University of USSR and graduated in 1957. Ni obtained Candidate of Sciences degree (in 1962) and later honorary doctor degree (in 1990) from the Saint Petersburg Polytechnical University.

Ni is a professor at energy department of Tsinghua University. Ni was former Executive Vice-president of Tsinghua University.

Ni is a senior academician of the Chinese Academy of Engineering. Ni is the Vice-chairman of the Beijing Association for Science and Technology. Ni is also a leader and senior advisor of energy strategy, technology, policy for Chinese government.

== See also ==
- Ni Wei-Tou (Ni Weidou) in Taiwan, these two Nis share the same name, the same hometown (Zhenhai District, Ningbo), and the same ancestry. And the Taiwanese Ni graduated from and works for the National Tsing Hua University (in Hsinchu, Taiwan), which is the sister university (share the same root) of the Tsinghua University in Beijing.
