= Lo Tsung-lo =

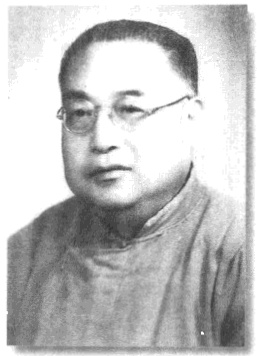
- Born: 2 August 1898; Qing dynasty Huangyan, Zhejiang
- Died: 26 October 1978 (aged 80); China Shanghai
- Other name: 羅宗洛
- Education: Hokkaido Imperial University (BS, MS, PhD)
- Occupation: Scientist (Plant physiology)

Lo Tsung-lo (Chinese: 羅宗洛; pinyin: Luó Zōngluò; 2 August 1898 – 26 October 1978) was a Chinese botanist and plant physiologist. Lo was a main founder of modern plant physiology in China. He was the first president of National Taiwan University after World War II.

== Biography ==
=== Early history and education ===
Lo was born in Huangyan, Zhejiang, Qing China on 2 August 1898. His father was a merchant. Lo entered Hangzhou Anding Middle School in 1911. In 1912, Lo transferred to Shanghai Nanyang Middle School and graduated in 1917.

Lo went to Japan and entered the College-preparatory school in the First Higher School at first. Next, he studied in the Second Higher School. After graduation, he entered the Hokkaido Imperial University, and majored agricultural science. After receiving his bachelor's degree and master's degree, Lo submitted his doctoral dissertation to Hokkaido Imperial University and received a Ph.D. in 1930. He was the second Chinese student to earn a doctoral degree from one of Japan's Imperial Universities.

=== Return to China ===
Lo returned to China and in February 1930 became professor and head of the department of biology at Sun Yat-sen University in Guangzhou. In 1932, Lo moved to Shanghai and became a professor at Jinan University. In 1933, Lo moved to National Central University (now Nanjing University) and served as a professor in its department of biology. From 1940 to 1944, Lo was a professor at Zhejiang University. In the summer of 1944, Lo became the director of the Botany Research Institute of Academia Sinica in Chongqing, which was the wartime capital of China during the Second Sino-Japanese War.

=== In Taiwan ===
After the war ended in 1945, Lo was sent to Taiwan by the central government to take over Taihoku Imperial University (now National Taiwan University). He became the acting president of National Taiwan University in 1946, and is thus regarded as its first president. In October 1946, the Botany Research Institute of Academia Sinica was moved from Chongqing to Shanghai, with Lo still assigned as its president.

After the founding of the People's Republic of China in 1949, Lo became the first president of the Research Institute of Plant Physiology of the Chinese Academy of Sciences. Lo was one of the main founders of the Chinese Society for Plant Physiology, and was its first and second president.

Luo was a member of Academia Sinica (1948 election), and academician of the Chinese Academy of Sciences (1955 election). He died on 26 October 1978 at Zhongshan Hospital in Shanghai.

== About Lo Tsung-lo ==
- Zhejiang University: 我国现代植物生理学奠基人之一——罗宗洛 (One of main founders of modern plant physiology in China - Luo Zongluo)
- Photo and biography of Luo Zongluo
- Southeast University: Biography of Luo Zongluo
