= Jiaxing Vincent Abbey =

- 嘉兴文生修道院
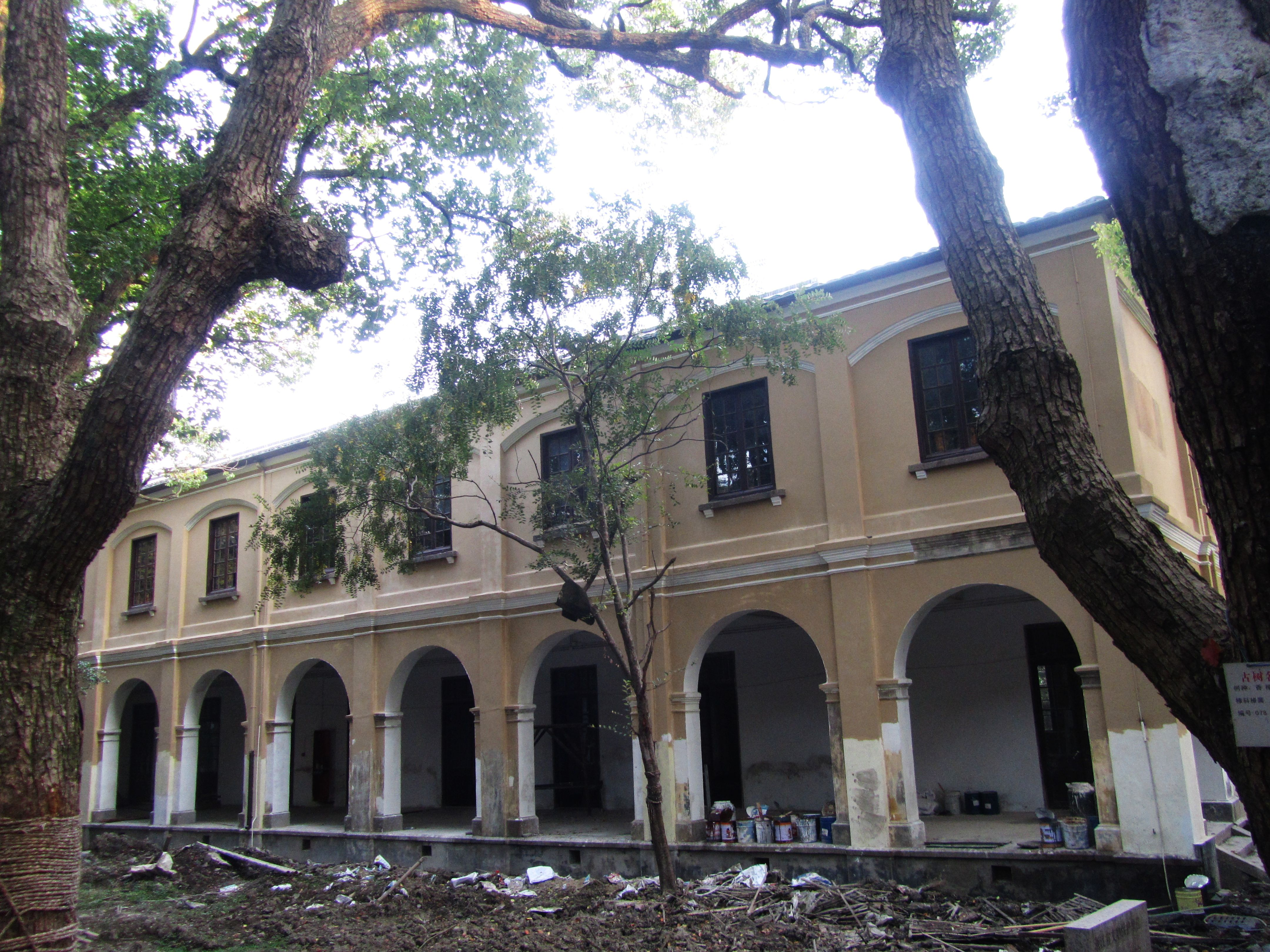
- Jiaxing Vincent Abbey in November 2013.

- Location in Zhejiang.
- 30°46′59″N 120°45′50″E
- Location: Nanhu District, Jiaxing, Zhejiang
- Country: China
- Denomination: Roman Catholic

History
- Status: Parish church
- Founded: 1902
- Founder: Bu Shijia (步师加)

Architecture
- Functional status: Passive
- Architectural type: Church building
- Years built: 1903
- Groundbreaking: 1902
- Completed: 1903

Specifications
- Materials: Bricks

Jiaxing Vincent Abbey (simplified Chinese: 嘉兴文生修道院; traditional Chinese: 嘉興文生修道院; pinyin: Jiāxīng Wensheng Xiūdàoyuàn) is a Roman Catholic Church in Nanhu District, Jiaxing, Zhejiang, China.

== History ==
Jiaxing Vincent Abbey was built by French priest Bu Shijia (步师加) in 1903, during the Guangxu period of the Qing dynasty (1644–1911). After the establishment of the Communist State in 1949, the church put an end to religious activities. During the Cultural Revolution, the Red Guards attacked the church and Catholic books were damaged or destroyed. In March 2005, it was designated as a "Historical and Cultural Site Protected at the Provincial Level" by the Zhejiang government. In May 2013, it was listed among the seventh batch of "Major National Historical and Cultural Sites in Zhejiang" alongside Jiaxing Catholic Church by the State Council of China.
