= Yi Ling =

Chinese transgender woman

Yi Ling (Chinese: 伊玲, born 1928, Jiaxing, China), formerly known as Qian Jinfan (Chinese: 钱今凡), is the oldest known transgender person in China. She started living as a woman at age 80, and had sex-reassignment surgery in 2010. Yi first came out publicly as a transgender woman in 2012.

Yi works as a calligrapher and art critic, and was once a government official. In 2009, she submitted a declaration letter to the Foshan Culture and Media Bureau, where she had worked before retiring; at that time she was starting to take hormones to enlarge her breasts, and to wear women's clothes. The government did not lower her pension or refuse to allow her to attend conferences. In 2010 she wrote another letter to inform the authorities that she was a woman. Yi Ling has a son, and has been married to a woman, Liang, since the age of 54.
