= YTO Cargo Airlines =

Chinese cargo airline

YTO Cargo Airlines 圆通航空

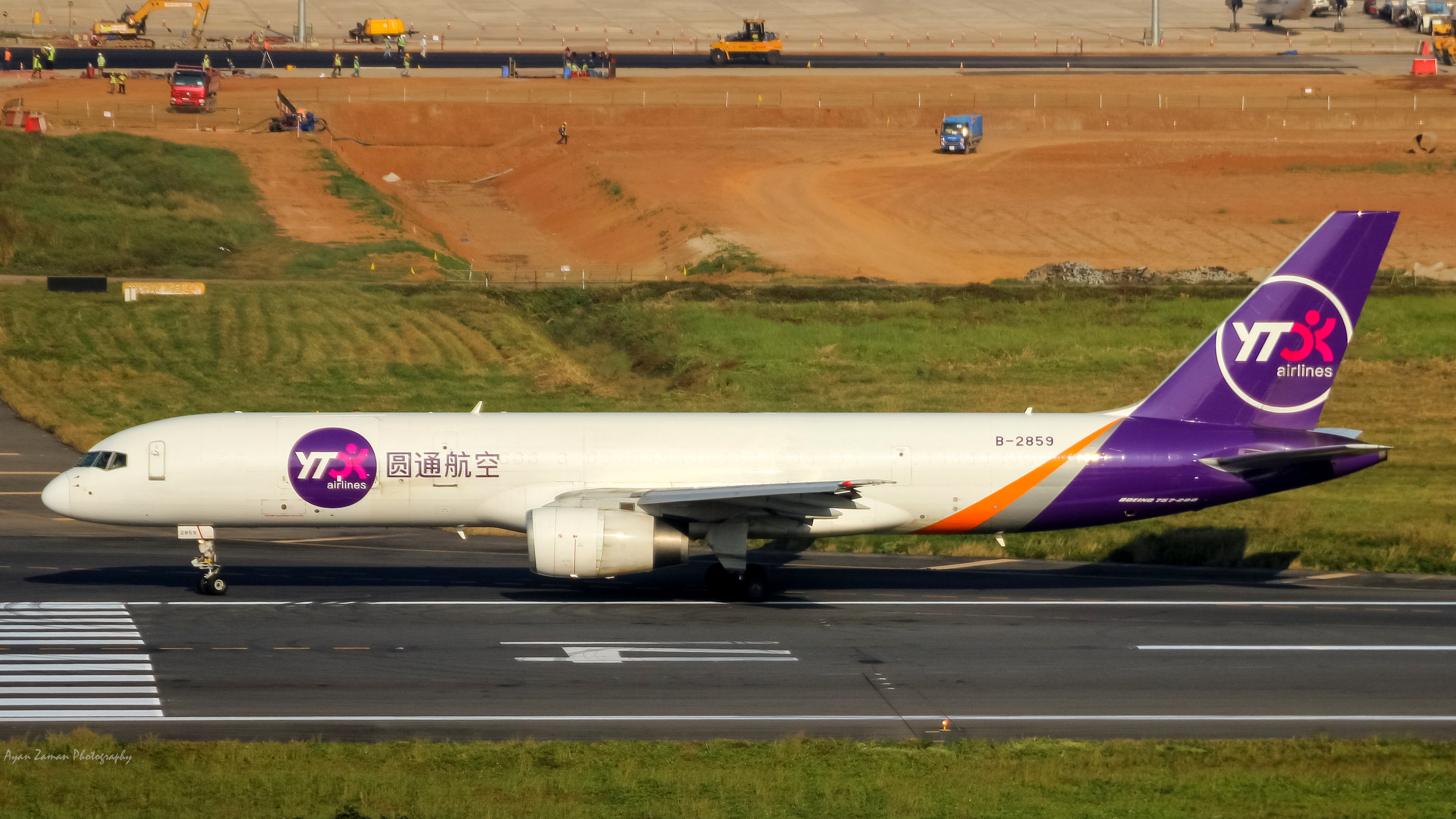
IATA	ICAO	Call sign
YG	HYT	QUICK AIR
- Founded: 2015; 11 years ago
- Commenced operations: 3 July 2015; 11 years ago
- Hubs: Hangzhou; Jiaxing
- Fleet size: 14
- Destinations: 21
- Parent company: YTO Express
- Headquarters: Hangzhou, Zhejiang, China
- Website: www.yto.net.cn

YTO Cargo Airlines Co., Ltd., operating as YTO Cargo Airlines, is a Chinese cargo airline based in Hangzhou, Zhejiang. It is a subsidiary of express delivery company YTO Express. The airline started operation in 2015. The company plans to open its new air-land cargo hub at Jiaxing Nanhu Airport by the end of 2025.

== Destinations ==
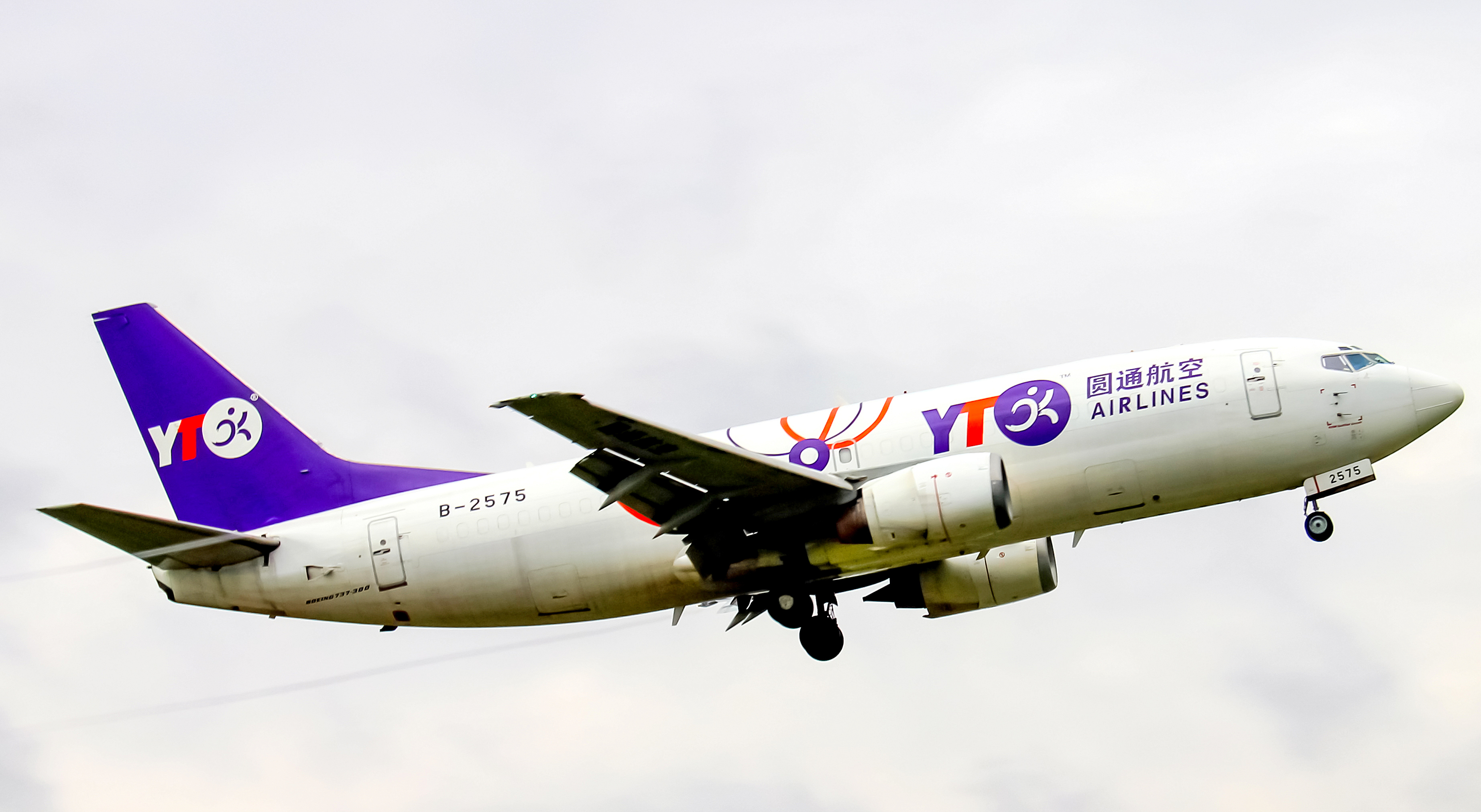
YTO Cargo Airlines' Boeing 737-300 taking off

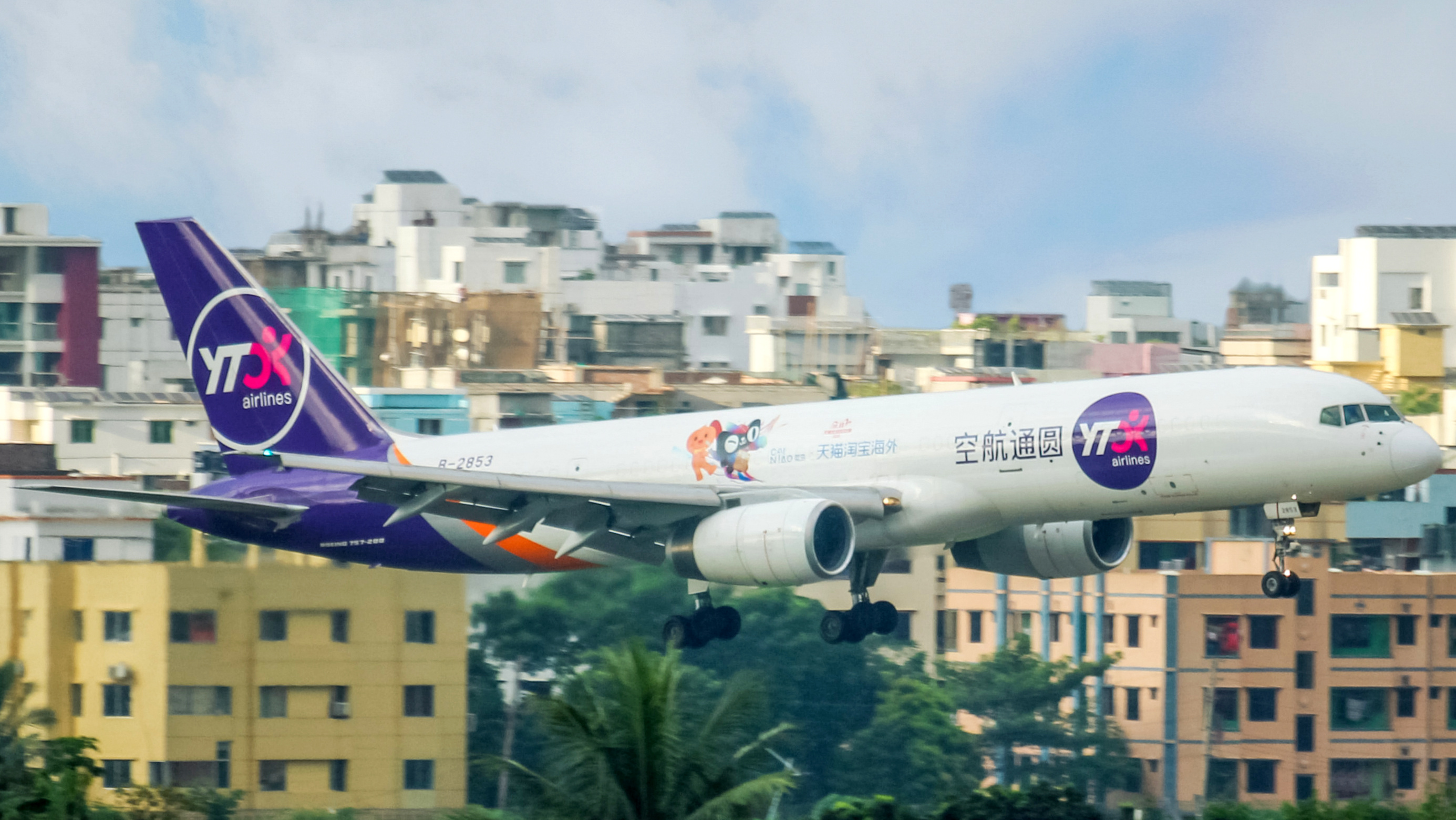
A YTO Cargo Airlines Boeing 757-200F landing

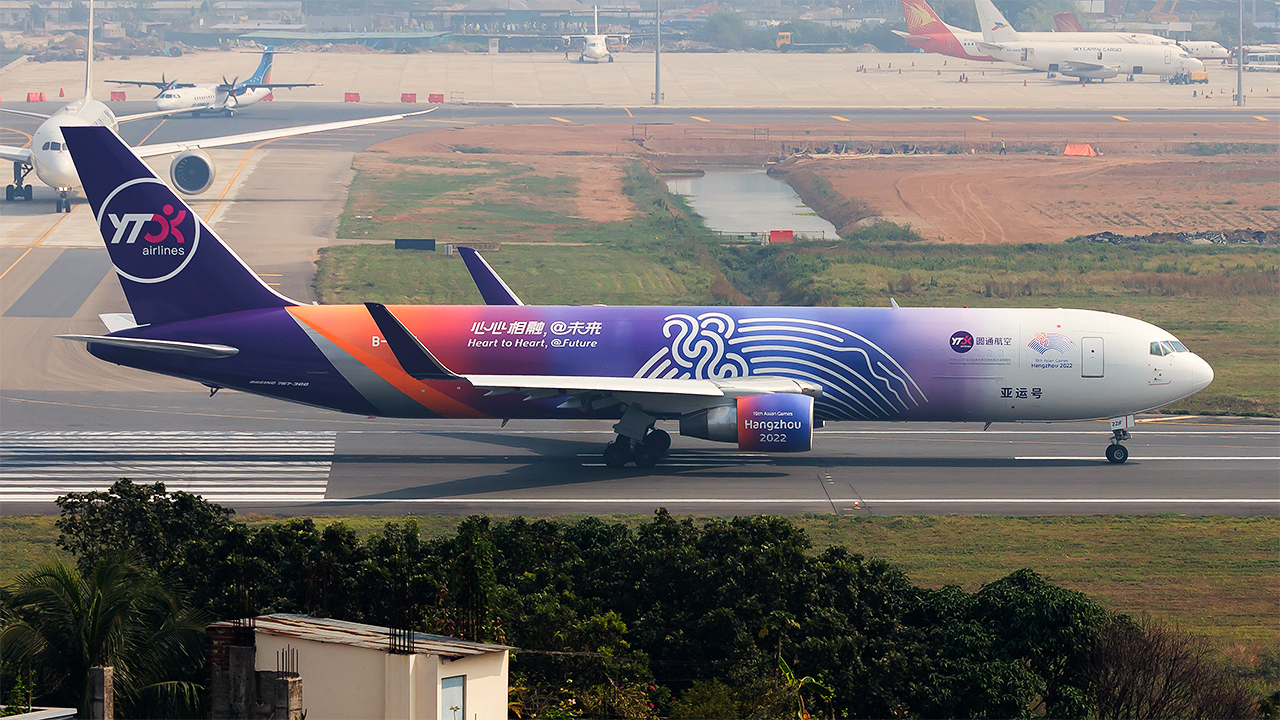
A YTO Cargo Airlines Boeing 767-300F wearing a special 2022 Asian Games livery

YTO Cargo Airlines operates to 21 destinations in eight countries.

In July 2019, the airline launched new routes to Uzbekistan and the Philippines. On 2 November 2020, Singapore was added to its network.

=== Asia ===
- Bangladesh
  - Dhaka – Hazrat Shahjalal International Airport
- China
  - Chengdu – Chengdu Shuangliu International Airport
  - Guangzhou – Guangzhou Baiyun International Airport
  - Hangzhou – Hangzhou Xiaoshan International Airport (hub)
  - Huizhou - Huizhou Pingtan Airport
  - Jiaxing - Jiaxing Nanhu Airport
  - Tianjin – Tianjin Binhai International Airport
  - Wuxi – Wuxi Shuofang Airport
  - Yining – Ili Yining International Airport
- India
  - Chennai – Chennai International Airport
  - Delhi – Indira Gandhi International Airport
  - Mumbai – Chhatrapati Shivaji Maharaj International Airport
  - Kolkata – Netaji Subhas Chandra Bose International Airport
- Japan
  - Osaka – Kansai International Airport
  - Tokyo – Narita International Airport
- Kyrgyzstan
  - Bishkek – Manas International Airport
- Pakistan
  - Karachi – Jinnah International Airport
  - Lahore – Allama Iqbal International Airport
- Philippines
  - Angeles City - Clark International Airport
  - Manila – Ninoy Aquino International Airport
- Singapore
  - Changi Airport
- South Korea
  - Seoul – Incheon International Airport
- Thailand
  - Bangkok – Suvarnabhumi Airport
- Uzbekistan
  - Tashkent – Tashkent International Airport
- Vietnam
  - Ho Chi Minh City – Tan Son Nhat International Airport

== Fleet ==
=== Current fleet ===
As of July 2026, YTO Cargo Airlines operates the following aircraft:

YTO Cargo Airlines fleet
Aircraft	In fleet	Orders	Notes
Boeing 757-200PCF	10	—	
Boeing 767-300ER/BDSF	3	—	
Comac C909/CCF	1	1	Launch customer.
Total	14	1	

=== Fleet development ===
On 25 December 2017, the airline received its first Boeing 757-200PCF. In December 2021, the airline will be the launch customer of the Comac ARJ21F after plans to acquire the aircraft were announced.

=== Former fleet ===
As of December 2025, YTO Cargo Airlines operated 10 Boeing 757-200PCF, 3 Boeing 767-300ER(BDSF) and 1 Comac 909CCF

YTO Cargo Airlines also previously operated:

- 6 Boeing 737-300SF
- 2 Boeing 737-300BDSF
