= Wangdian =

Wangdian (王店) may refer to the following locations in China:

== Towns ==
- Wangdian, Anhui, Yingzhou District, Fuyang
- Wangdian, Neixiang County, Henan
- Wangdian, Dangyang, Hubei
- Wangdian, Xiaochang County, Hubei
- Wangdian, Tibet
- Wangdian, Zhejiang, Xiuzhou District, Jiaxing

== Townships ==
- Wangdian Township, Biyang County, Henan
- Wangdian Township, Huaibin County, Henan
- Wangdian Township, Huaiyang County, Henan
- Wangdian Township, Jiangsu, in Xuyi County
