= Zhuang Kuilong =

Chinese businessman

- Born: Zhuang Kuilong; 1961 or 1962 (age 62–63)
- Known for: Founder and chairman of Xinfengming Group
- Spouse: Qu Fengqi

Zhuang Kuilong (born 1961/1962) is a Chinese businessman and billionaire who cofounded the polyester manufacturer Xinfengming Group.

Zhuang began as a farmer before going to work for a collective fiber factory. In 2000, he cofounded Xinfengming with 11 other cofounders including his wife. In 2017, Xinfengming listed on Shanghai Stock Exchange.

He lives in Jiaxing, China with his wife Qu Fengqi.

Forbes lists his net worth as of April 2022 at $1.0 billion USD.
