= Jiaxing Nanhu Airport =

Airport in Jiaxing, Zhejiang, China

Jiaxing Nanhu Airport 嘉兴南湖机场
- IATA: JNH; ICAO: ZSJX

Summary
- Airport type: Public / Military
- Owner: Jiaxing City
- Operator: Zhejiang Airport Group
- Serves: Jiaxing
- Location: Xiuzhou, Jiaxing, Zhejiang, China
- Opened: 26 December 2025; 10 months ago
- Hub for: YTO Cargo Airlines
- Built: 1936; 90 years ago
- Elevation AMSL: 5 m (16 ft)
- Coordinates: 30°42′24″N 120°40′50″E

Map
- Location of airport in China

Runways
Direction	Length		Surface
Direction	m	ft	Surface
05/23	2,800	9,186	Concrete
12/30	3,400	11,155	Asphalt

Jiaxing Nanhu Airport (IATA: JNH, ICAO: ZSJX) — formerly known as Jiaxing Air Base — is an airport in Jiaxing, the city in East China's Zhejiang province. The airport is located 8 kilometers from the city center in Xiuzhou District. Due to Jiaxing Airport's proximity to both Shanghai and Hangzhou, it is touted as "Shanghai's third airport" and "Hangzhou's second airport". The airport is designed to handle 500,000 passengers annually.

It was converted from a military airbase to a dual-use military and civilian airport. Backed by YTO Express (YTO Cargo Airlines), construction of the civilian facilities started in November 2022. In June 2024, the name Jiaxing Nanhu Airport was approved. The airport opened for civilian use on 26 December 2025.

== Facilities ==
Jiaxing Airport is a class 4E civilian/military dual use airport. Jiaxing Airport have one 3,400 meter long runway and a 25,900 square-meter terminal building. There are 56 aircraft parking stands, 33 of them are for cargo airplanes. The airport will be able to accommodate all aircraft sizes below a A380 .

== Airlines and destinations ==
Several domestic destinations have been announced: Loong Air plans to operate flights to Chengdu Shuangliu, Shenzhen, Guangzhou and Changchun. Destinations Harbin, Xi'an, Chongqing, Kunming and Haikou are planned to have its first flight before the 2026 lunar new year. Other announced destinations are Guilin and Yinchuan.

The airport serves as a cargo hub for YTO Cargo Airlines. Planned international operations include destinations in the United States, Japan, Thailand, Canada and Germany.

=== Passenger ===
Airlines	Destinations
Air China	Beijing-Capital, Chengdu-Shuangliu, Chongqing
China Eastern Airlines	Beijing–Daxing, Kunming, Xi'an
China Southern Airlines	Changsha, Guangzhou, Taiyuan, Urumqi
Loong Air	Changchun, Chengdu-Shuangliu, Chengdu-Tianfu, Chongqing, Guiyang, Haikou, Harbin, Lanzhou, Shenyang, Shenzhen, Urumqi, Yinchuan
Shenzhen Airlines	Shenzhen

=== Cargo ===
Airlines	Destinations
Suparna Airlines	Los Angeles
YTO Cargo Airlines	Huizhou

== See also ==
- Ezhou Huahu International Airport, cargo-focused airport in Hubei province
- List of the busiest airports in China
- List of People's Liberation Army Air Force airbases
