= The First Hospital of Jiaxing =

Geography
- Location: Jiaxing, Zhejiang, China

History
- Founded: 1920

Links
- Lists: Hospitals in China

The First Hospital of Jiaxing (嘉兴市第一医院), or The First Hospital Affiliated to Jiaxing College, is a general hospital located in Jiaxing, Zhejiang Province, the People's Republic of China, with the rank of "Grade 3, Class B". The hospital was founded in 1920.

== History ==
The predecessor of the First Hospital was Shengxin Hospital (圣心医院), a church hospital founded by the French Catholic church in 1920. After the formation of People's Republic of China (PRC), Jiaxing municipal government took over the hospital in September 1951. In September 1952, it merged with Jiaxing Medical Institute, and became Jiaxing Municipal Hospital. It changed the name to the First Hospital of Jiaxing in November 1954. In September 1989, it became a teaching hospital of Zhejiang Medical University. In September 1992, Jiaxing Schistosomiasis Institute and the clinical part of Jiaxing Tuberculosis Institute were merged into the First Hospital. It became the First Hospital affiliated to Jiaxing College in 2001. The hospital is a State-level standardized training bases for resident doctors.

== Present ==
As of 2024, the hospital had 610 standard beds. The actually opening beds were 820. There were over 2000 staff members, among which 167 hold senior titles, and 329 hold junior titles. The hospital is focusing on strengthening its stroke center, chest pain center, trauma center, critical care center and atrial fibrillation center.

== Relocation ==
The hospital moved to a new site in October 2011. In 2024, the new campus had a land area of 138,750 m^{2}, and a total building area of 185,000 square meters. With the investment of 800 million RMB, the new hospital has 1,500 beds and was completed by the end of 2009.

== Honors ==
In November 2020, it was awarded "Commendation for Zhejiang Province's Fight Against the COVID-19 Epidemic" by The CPC Zhejiang Provincial Committee and the Zhejiang Provincial People's Government.

In November 2020, the Party Committee of Jiaxing First Hospital was rated as a Zhejiang Provincial Advanced Primary-level Party Organization.

In December 2020, it was recognized as a Demonstration Unit for Energy-saving Public Institutions for the 2019-2020 period.

On March 31, 2023, it was awarded the honorary title of "Zhejiang Provincial May 1 Labor Certificate".

In May 2025, it was awarded the title of the seventh "National Civilized Unit"
