= South Lake (Jiaxing) =

Lake in Jiaxing, Zhejiang, China

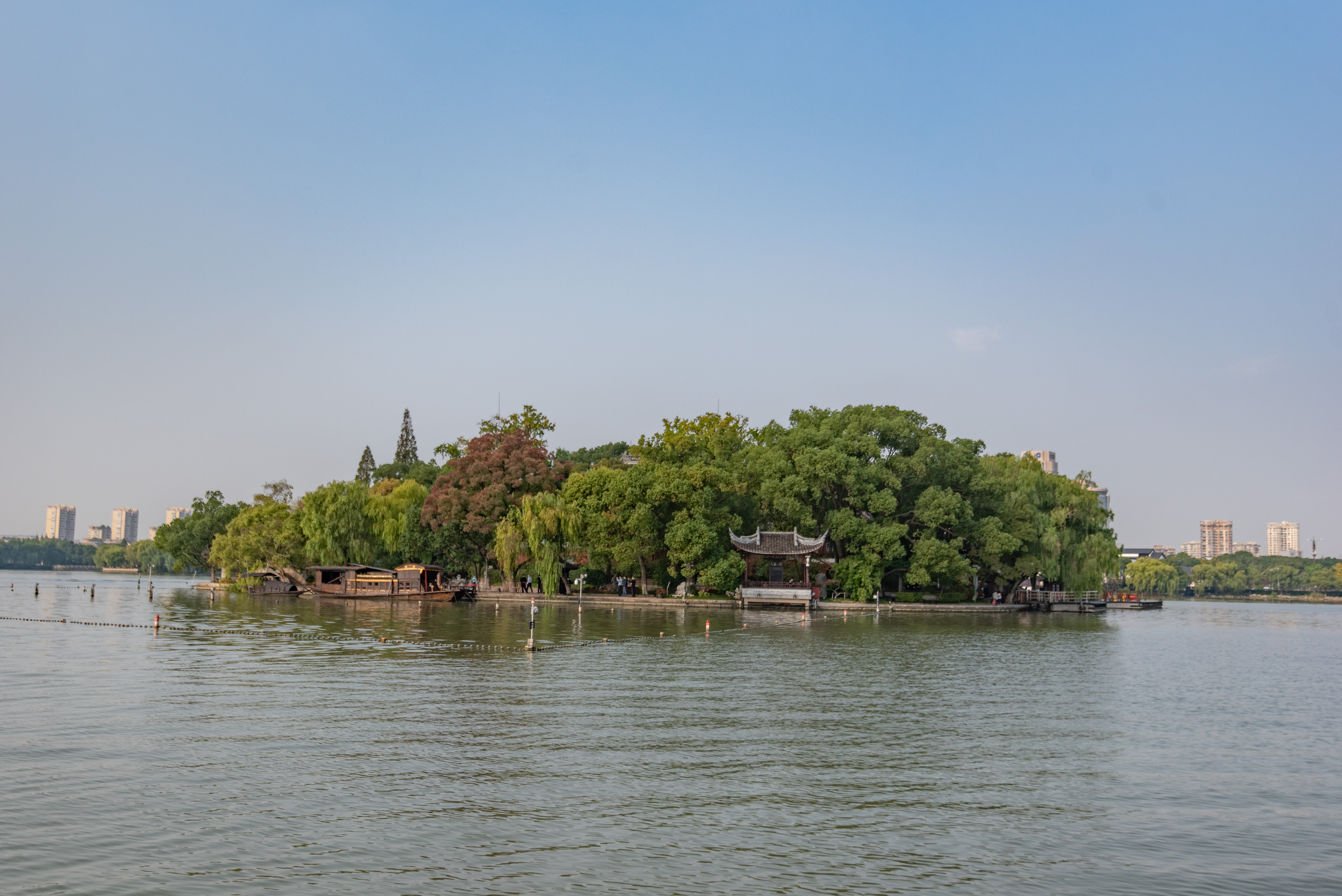
- South Lake in 2021

- Location within Zhejiang
- Coordinates: 30.757°N 120.756°E
- Basin countries: China
- Surface area: 54 ha (130 acres)

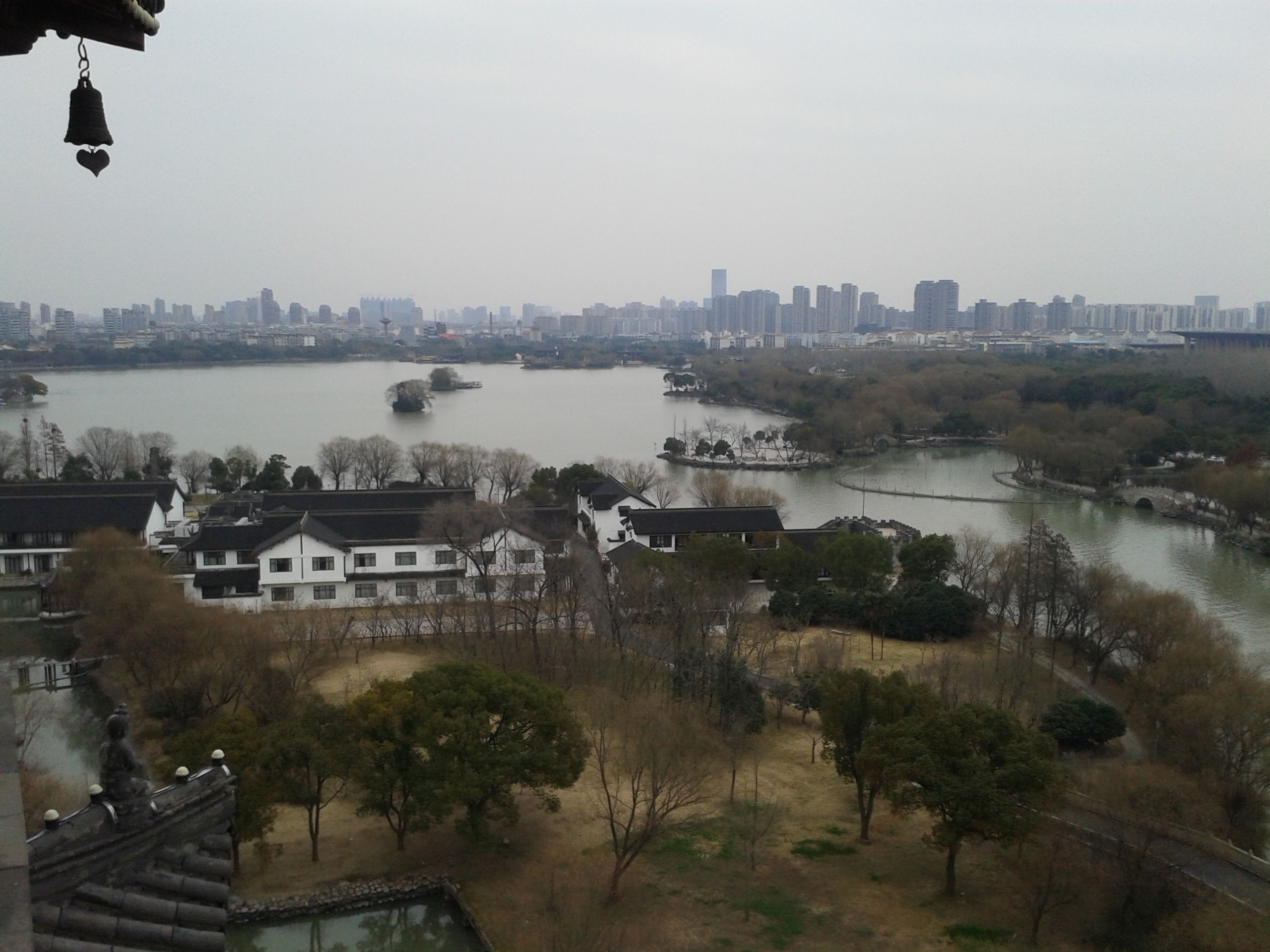
A view of Nanhu and the city of Jiaxing in the background

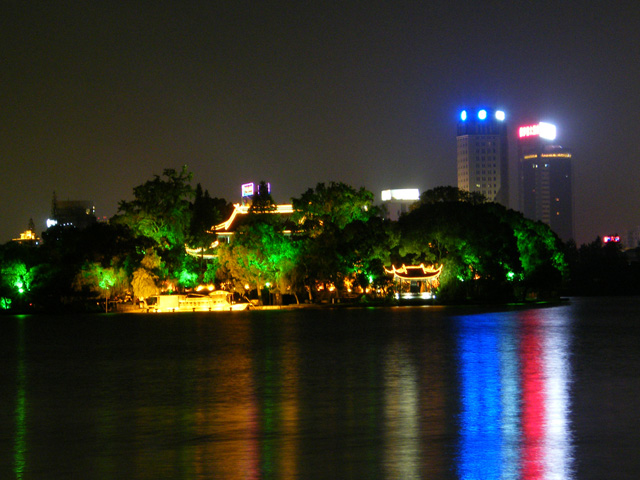
South Lake at night

South Lake (Chinese: 南湖; pinyin: Nán Hú; Wu: Noe^{平}Wu^{平}) is a lake in the South of Jiaxing, Zhejiang, China, and covers an area of 0.54 km^{2}. It is also known as "Mandarin Duck Lake" due to its shape.

Alongside the lake are the ruins of the Misty Rain Tower, which was first built in the 10th century AD. In the year 1548, during the Ming Dynasty, the local government dredged the waterways and piled up the mud into the center of South Lake, forming an islet. The Misty Rain tower was rebuilt on the islet the next year. In the following years, a group of ancient garden-style architectures emerged around it.

The 1st National Congress of the Chinese Communist Party was transferred from Shanghai to Jiaxing in 1921 and the final agenda was carried out in a boat on South Lake, which concluded with the establishment of the party.
