= Jiaxing Catholic Church =

- 嘉兴天主堂
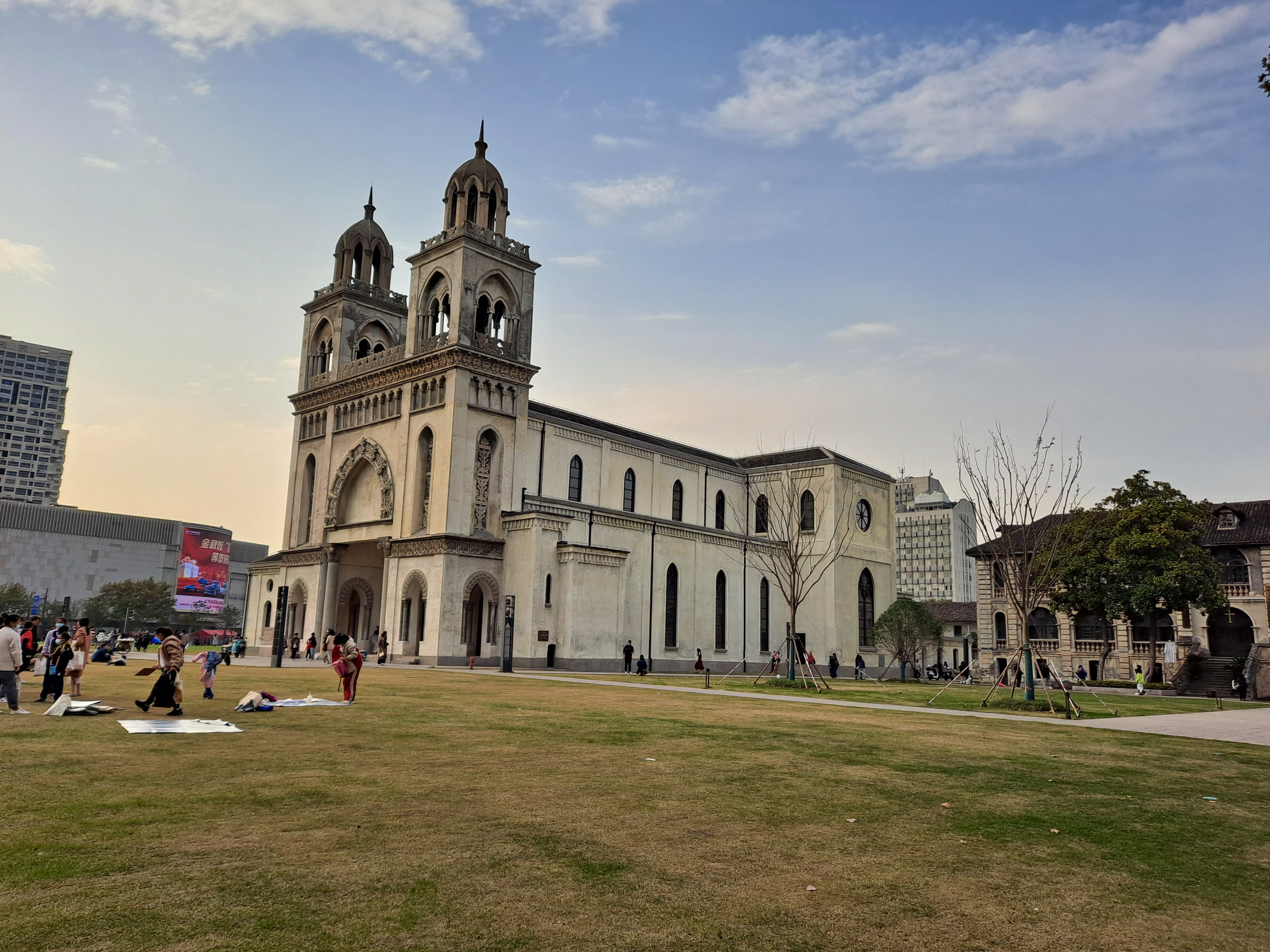
- Jiaxing Catholic Church in November 2021.

- Location in Zhejiang
- 30°46′03″N 120°45′28″E
- Location: Jiaxing, Zhejiang
- Country: China
- Denomination: Roman Catholic

History
- Status: Parish church
- Founded: 1902
- Founder: Bu Shijia (步师加)

Architecture
- Functional status: Active
- Architectural type: Church building
- Style: Gothic architecture
- Years built: 1930
- Groundbreaking: 1917
- Completed: 1930

Specifications
- Materials: Bricks

Jiaxing Catholic Church (simplified Chinese: 嘉兴天主堂; traditional Chinese: 嘉興天主堂; pinyin: Jiāxīng Tiānzhǔtáng) is a Roman Catholic Church in downtown Jiaxing, Zhejiang, China.

== History ==
Jiaxing Catholic Church was originally built by French priest Louis Boscat / Bu Shijia 步师加 (1848-1904) in 1902. It was the headquarters of Carmelites in Jiaxing. The current church was designed by the Italian priest, missionary of the Congregation of the Mission, Angelo-Joseph Asinelli / Han Rilu 韩日禄 (1871-1950). The construction began in 1917 and was completed in 1930 thanks to gifts from the Shanghai philanthropist Joseph Lo Pa Hong 陆伯鸿 (1875-1937). During the Cultural Revolution, the Red Guards attacked the church and part of it was badly damaged. In March 2005, it was designated as a "Historical and Cultural Site Protected at the Provincial Level" by the Zhejiang government. In May 2013, it was listed among the seventh batch of "Major National Historical and Cultural Sites in Zhejiang" alongside Jiaxing Vincent Abbey by the State Council of China. The restoration of the church will begin in November 2019 and is expected to be completed in December 2020.
