= Women's clothing in China =

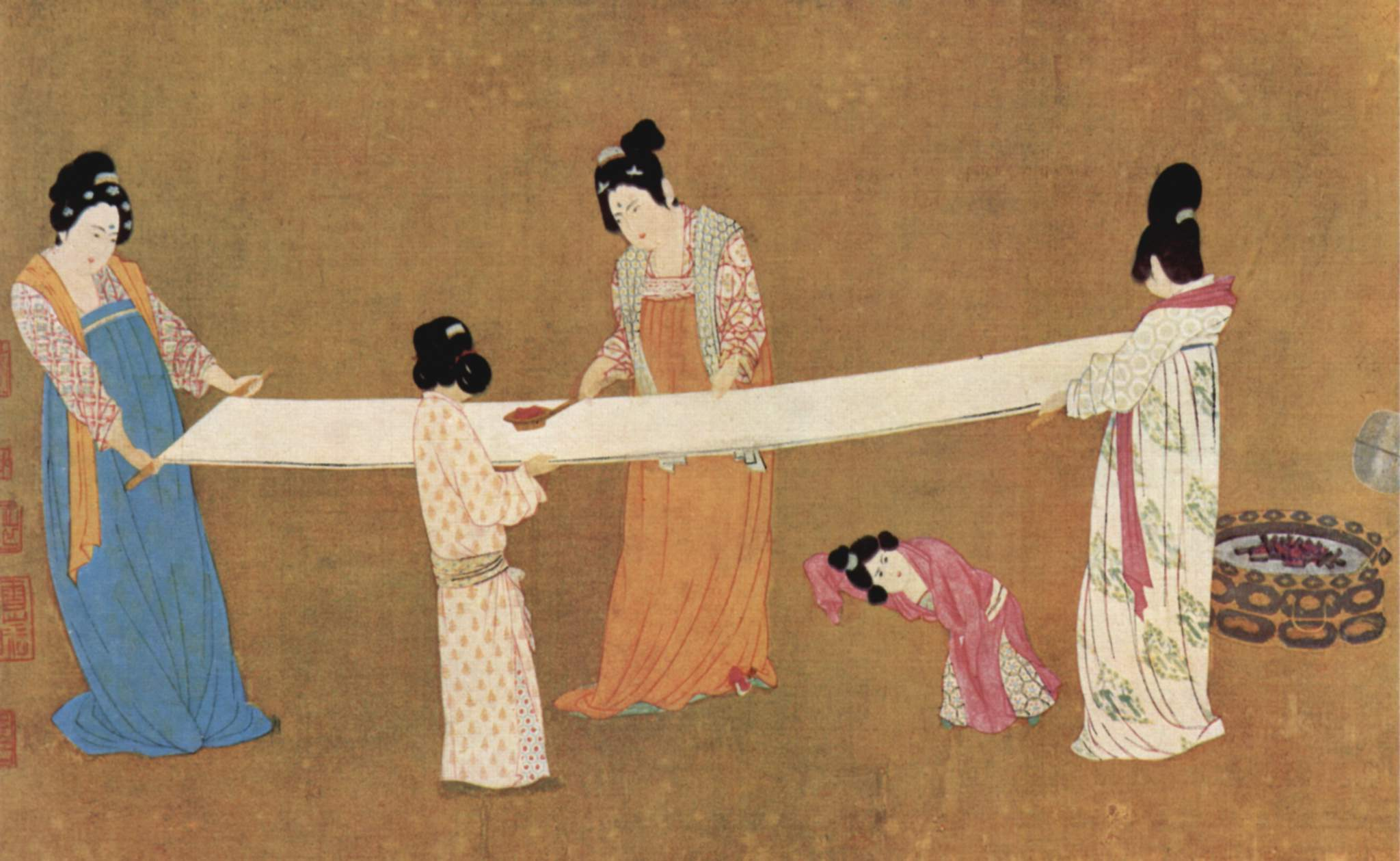
Court ladies making silk, painted by the Song dynasty Emperor Huizong, a remake of an 8th-century original by Tang dynasty artist Zhang Xuan.

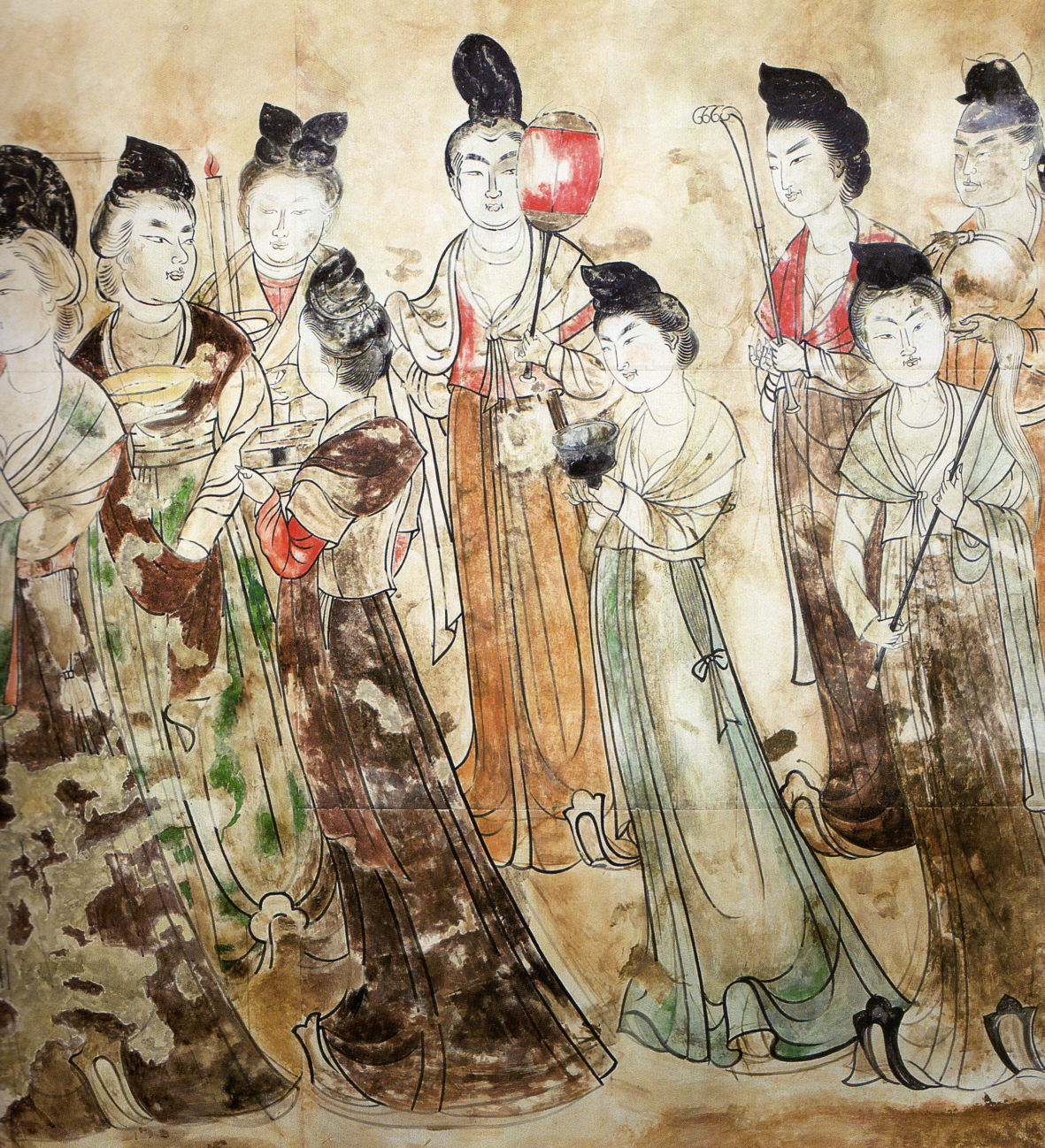
Tang court ladies from the tomb of Princess Yongtai in the Qianling Mausoleum, near Xi'an in Shaanxi, China. 706 AD.

In China, women had different kinds of clothes in ancient times. Those clothes changed with the dynasty. For examples, in the 1920s, the Cheongsam was fashionable among socialites and upperclass women; during the 1960s, very austere clothing styles were prevalent; today, a wide variety of fashions are worn. Different provinces and regions of China also have different clothing styles.

In Qin and Han dynasties, women usually wore loose clothes with long, large, sleeves. Under the long skirt was a pair of high-heeled clogs, usually with some embroidery on them. There was usually a scarf called Jinguo (巾帼) wrapped on the arm of a noble woman, while ordinary or poor women had no decoration on their arms. As time passed by, the coat tended to be shorter and the skirt became longer. Noble women even needed maids’ help to lift up the skirts, to avoid the skirts being stained by the ground.

In Sui and Tang dynasties, women's clothes had a trend of being more open. Small-sleeved coats, usually made of yarn, skirts that were still long, wide and long scarves were what was often worn. They could bare the part of their body above their chests. This sort of cloth could show the beauty of the women better. Another kind of clothes that were popular at that time were things with big sleeves, short breasted shirts and long and light skirts.

The attire of women during the Song dynasty (960 - 1279) was distinguished from men's clothing by being fastened on the left, not on the right. Women wore long dresses or blouses that came down almost to the ankle. They also wore skirts and jackets with short or long sleeves. When strolling about outside and along the road, women of wealth chose to wear square purple scarves around their shoulders.

== Traditional clothing styles ==
=== Banbi ===
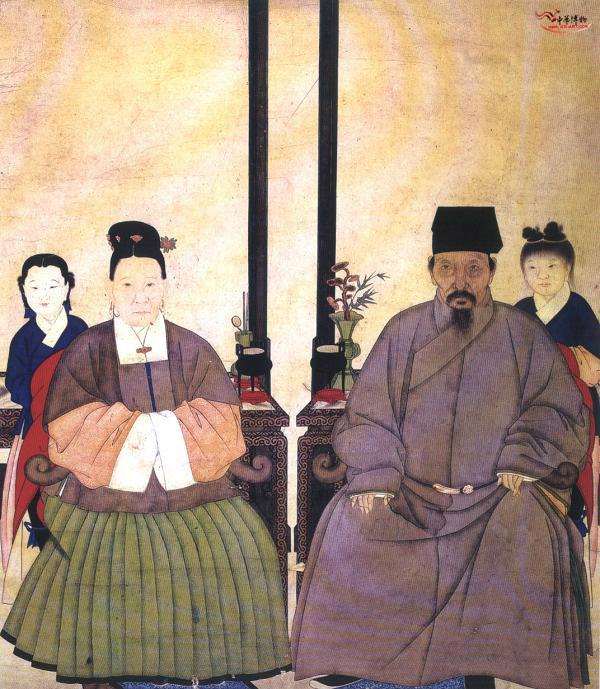
Portrait from China's Ming dynasty. The woman is wearing a Banbi

Banbi (半臂, lit. "half arm") also known as Banxiu (半袖), is a form of waistcoat or outerwear that was worn over ruqun, and had half-length sleeves. The style of its collar varied, but it could be secured at the front either with ties or a metal button. According to Chinese records, the banbi clothing style was invented from the short jacket (短襦) that the Chinese wear. It was first designated as a waistcoat for palace maids, but soon became popular amongst the commoners. In the "Legend of Huo Xiao Yu" (崔小玉传), written during the Tang dynasty, the main female character Huo Xiaoyu wears this style most of the time.

=== Beizi ===
A beizi (褙子) is an item of traditional Chinese attire common to both men and women, similar to a cloak. Most popular during the Ming dynasty, beizi also known as banbi during the Tang dynasty is believed to have been adopted from Central Asia during the Tang dynasty through the Silk Road, when cultural exchange was frequent.

However, it is also believed to have been derived from banbi during the Song dynasty, where the sleeves and the garment lengthened.

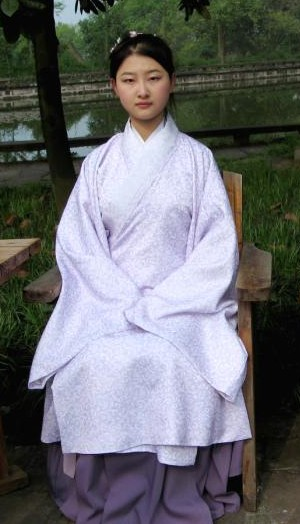
Chang-ao (長襖) - formal wear for women

=== Chang'ao ===
Chang-ao (Chinese: 長襖) is a traditional Chinese style of attire for women. It is a form of formal wear, and is often perceived as a longer version of ruqun. However, it was actually developed from zhiduo during the Ming dynasty, and is worn over a skirt. It is wide-sleeved, shorter than zhiduo, and has no side panels (暗擺) at the side slits (thus showing the skirt worn underneath). There is often an optional detachable protective huling (護領, lit. "protect collar") sewn to the collar. The huling can be white or any other (often dark) colours. The collar is of the same colour as the clothing.

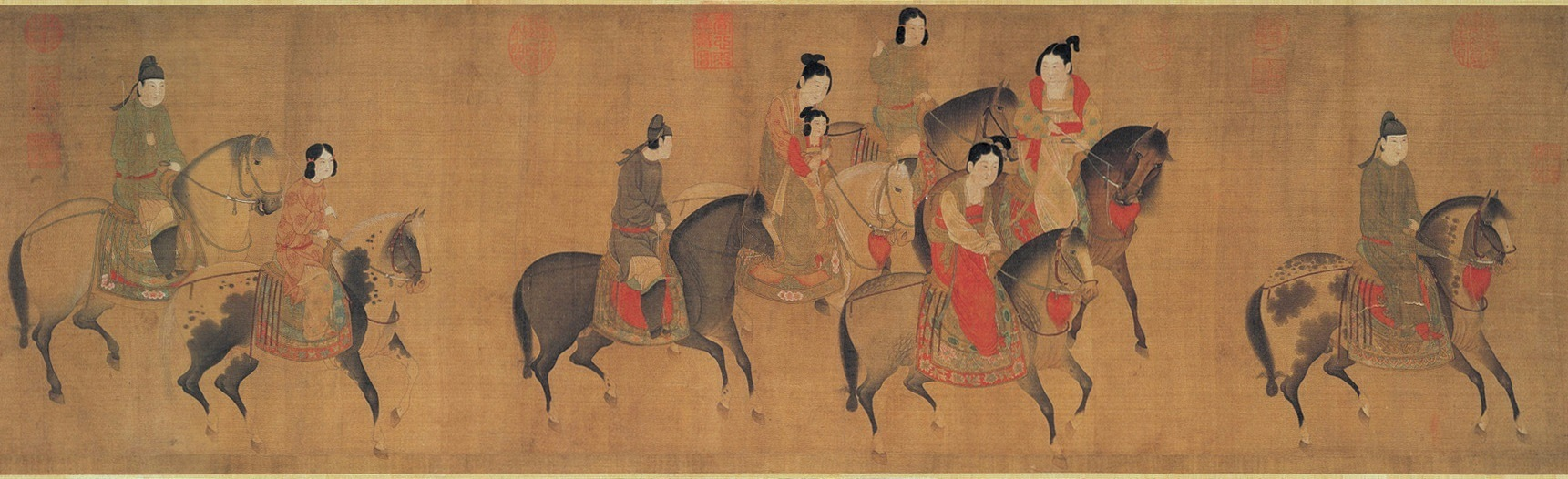
A painting of court ladies and one man on horseback, dressed in upper class outing apparel, a 12th-century painting by Li Gonglin, as well as a remake of an 8th-century original by Tang artist Zhang Xuan.

=== Daxiushan ===
Daxiushan (大袖衫), translated as "Large Sleeve Gown", is a traditional Chinese attire for women and was most popular during the Tang dynasty amongst the royal family. After the golden age of the Tang dynasty ended, the influence of Hufu (胡服), or clothing styles from Central and Western Asia, gradually weakened and Tang royal women's clothing styles began to make its transformation.

It was not until the Mid-Late Tang period (中晚唐时期) that the distinctions between Royal women's clothing and other styles became increasingly obvious. The width had increased more than four feet and its sleeve is often wider than 1.3 metres. It features a distinctive rode that covers from the ground to just above the chest with a knot wrapped around the waist, a light and sometimes see-through outer coat that ties together at the bottom and often goes along with a long scarf wrapped around the arm. The clothing often only covered half of women's breast, and so it was restricted to people of a certain status, like a princess or gējī. It has come to be known as Da-Xiu-Shan but has been called Dian-Chai-Li-Yi (钿钗礼衣) at various times. The clothing was mainly worn for special ceremonial occasions and had different variations, which were mainly the result of different collar formations (e.g., parallel or cross collar or those with no collar).

=== Diyi ===
Diyi (翟衣) is the traditional Chinese attire worn by empresses and crown princesses (the wife of the crown prince) in the Ming dynasty. It was a formal wear meant only for ceremonial purposes. It was a form of shenyi, and was embroidered with long-tailed pheasants (翟, Di) and circular flowers (小輪花). It was worn with a phoenix crown (without the dangling strings of pearls by the sides). Diyi was worn by empresses and other royal noblewomen (differed according during different dynasties) since the Zhou dynasty, under various names like huiyi (褘衣) in Zhou and Song dynasty, and miaofu (庙服) in Han dynasty.

=== Lotus shoes ===
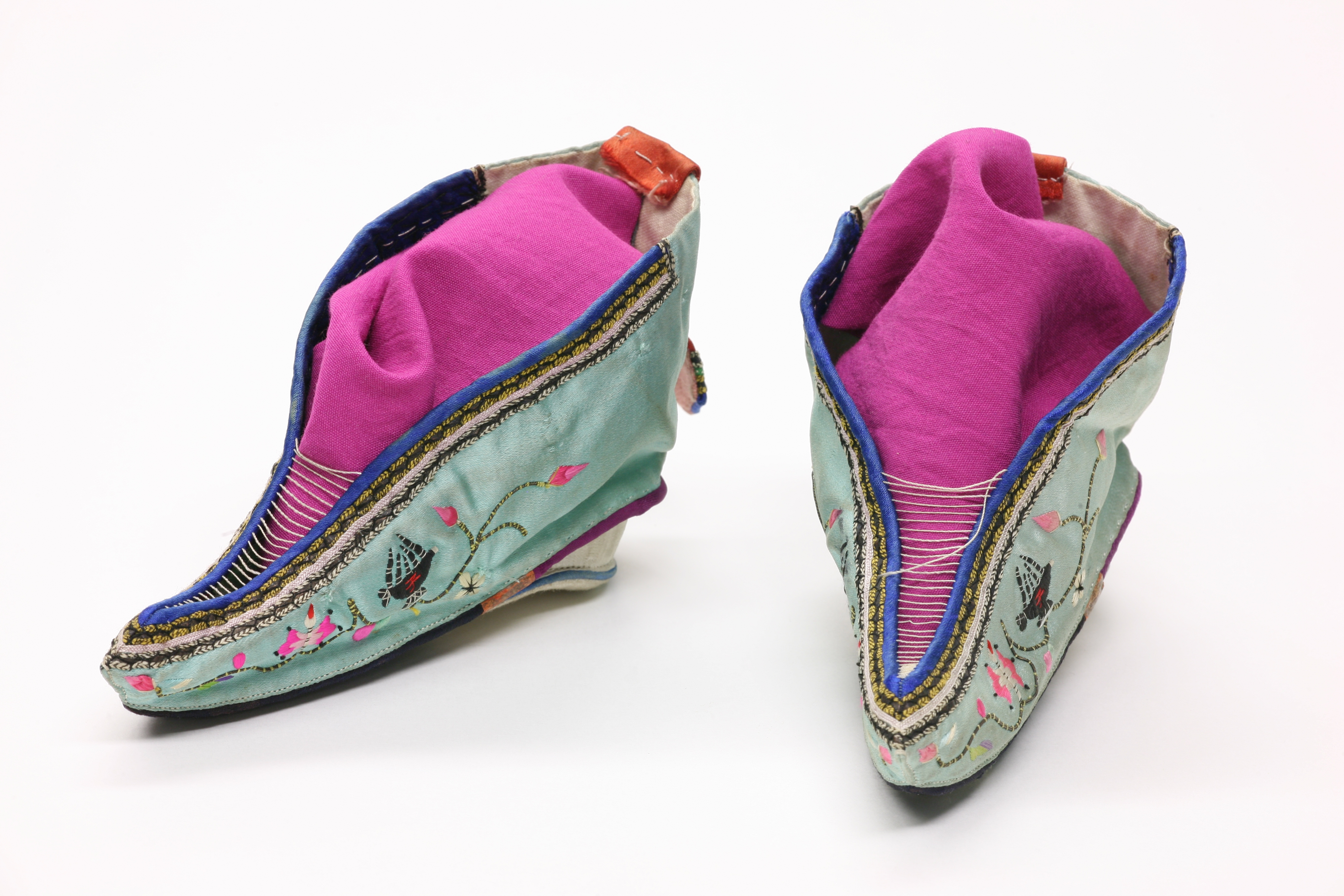
Lotus shoes

Lotus shoes (蓮履 / 莲履, lianlǚ) were footwear that were worn by women in China who had bound feet. The shoes were cone or sheath-shaped, intended to resemble a lotus bud. They were delicately constructed from cotton or silk, and small enough to fit in the palm of a hand. Some designs had heels or wedge-shaped soles. They were made in different styles and colors, and were typically ornately decorated, with embroidered designs of animals or flowers that could continue on the sole of the shoe. Some designs only fit over the tip of the foot, giving the illusion of a small bound foot when worn under a long skirt. Though foot binding is no longer practised, many lotus shoes survive as artefacts in museums or private collections.

=== Phoenix crown ===
A Phoenix crown (kao) was a Chinese traditional headgear for women. It was worn by noblewomen in the Ming dynasty on ceremonies or official occasions. It was also the traditional headwear for brides. It was adorned with gold dragons, phoenixes made with kingfisher feathers, beaded pheasants, pearls and gemstones. The number of pearls used ranged from 3426 to 5449 pieces, while the number of gemstones used ranged from 95 to 128 pieces. These pearls, gemstones and kingfisher feathers are made into ornamental flowers, leaves, clouds, and bobin (博鬢, the 'wings' at the side/back of the crown). The weight of the entire crown ranged from 2 to 3 kilograms.

=== Ruqun ===
Ruqun (襦裙) is an item of traditional Chinese attire (Hanfu) primarily for women. It consists of a blouse (襦, ru) and a wrap-around skirt (裙, qun). It has a long history, and has been worn by women since the Warring States period. Generally, the blouse was tucked into the skirt. The popularity of ruqun declined during the Han dynasty, but increased again during the Southern and Northern Dynasties. During the Sui and Tang dynasties, the skirts were tied higher and higher up the waist, until they were eventually tied above the breasts, and worn with short blouses. In addition to the normal crossed-collar blouses, parallel/straight-collar (對襟) blouses were also worn in this period, thus exposing the cleavage of the breasts. During the Song dynasty, the skirts were eventually lowered from the breast level back to the normal waistline.

By the Ming dynasty, ruqun became the most common form of attire for women. The sleeves of the blouse were mostly curved with a narrow sleeve cuff (琵琶袖, pipa sleeve). There is often an optional detachable protective huling (護領, lit. "protect collar") sewn to the collar. The huling can be white or any other dark colour. The collar is of the same colour as the clothing. Towards the start of the Qing dynasty, the skirt was mostly baizhequn (百摺裙, lit. "hundred pleats skirt") or mamianqun (馬面裙, lit. "horse face skirt").

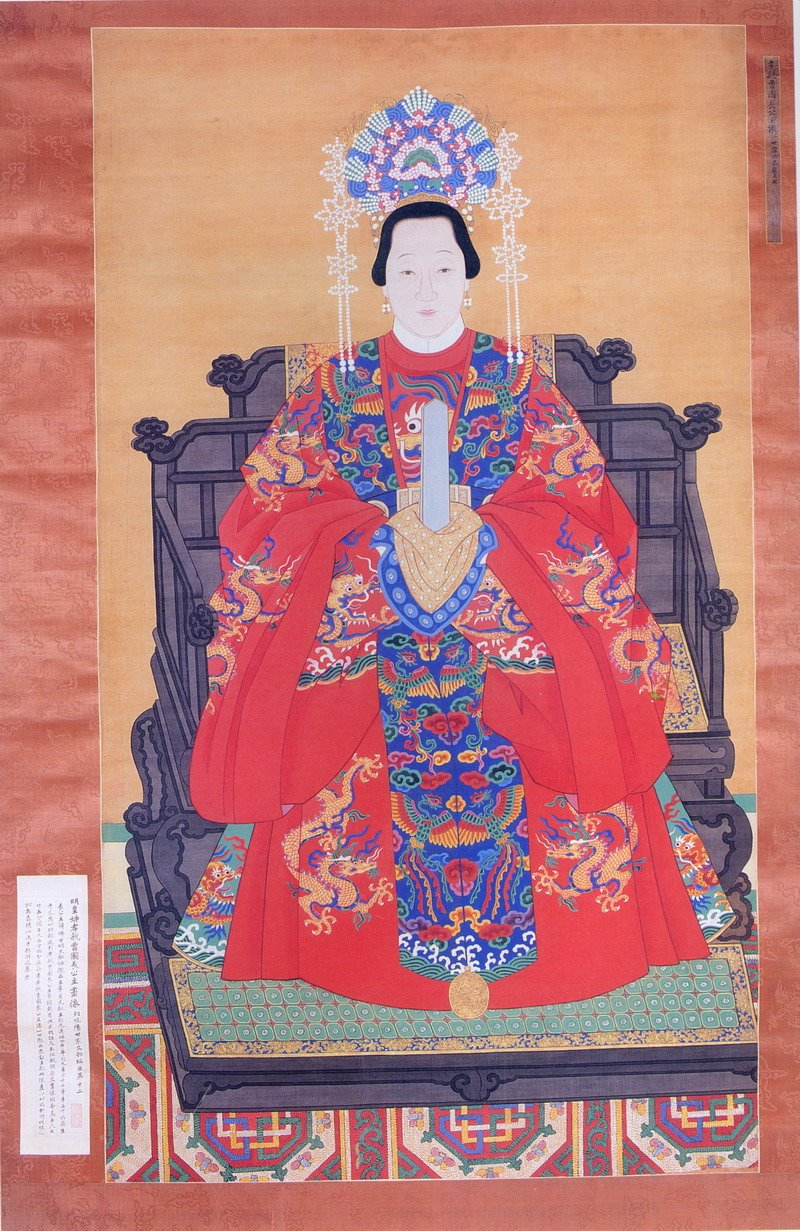
Ming dynasty portrait of a noblewoman wearing yuanlingshan, phoenix crown and xiapei

=== Yuan lingshan ===
Yuanlingshan (圓領衫) was the most common form of attire for both male and female officials and nobles during the Ming dynasty. The difference between civilian's and officials'/nobles' yuanlingshan is that officials'/nobles' yuanlingshan had a mandarin square (補子) on it. The sleeves of the yuanlingshan were mostly curved with a narrow sleeve cuff (琵琶袖, pipa sleeve). It had a round collar and side slits. Officials'/nobles' yuanlingshan were also wedding attire for commoners. The groom wears a wusha hat (烏紗帽) and the yuanlingshan of a 9th rank official robe. The bride wears a phoenix crown (鳳冠) and a red yuanlingshan with the xiapei (霞帔) of a noblewoman.

== More recent styles ==
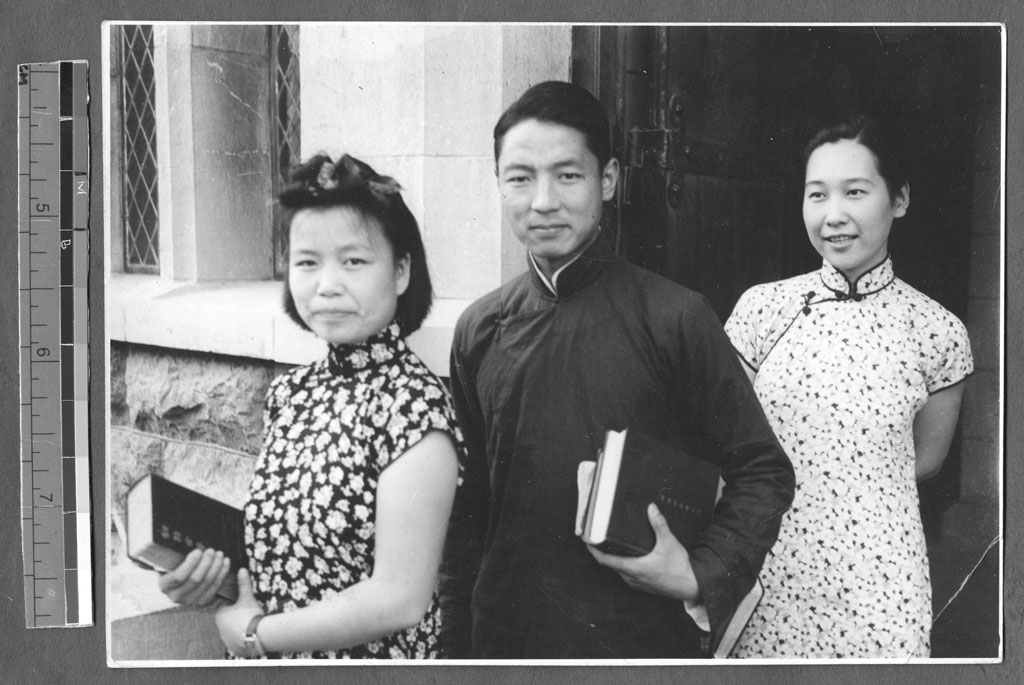
Women students at Shantung Christian University, 1941

=== Cheongsam ===
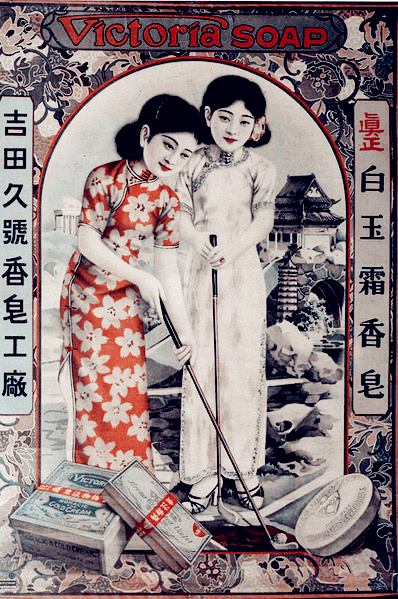
Two women wearing cheongsam in a 1930s Shanghai advertisement.

The cheongsam is a body-hugging (modified in Shanghai) one-piece Chinese dress for women; the male version is the changshan. It is known in Mandarin Chinese as the qípáo (旗袍; Wade-Giles ch'i-p'ao), and is also known in English as a mandarin gown. The stylish and often tight-fitting cheongsam or qipao (chipao) that is most often associated with today was created in the 1920s in Shanghai and was made fashionable by socialites and upperclass women.

=== Early People's Republic of China ===
In the early years of the People’s Republic of China, the Lenin suit, also known as Lenin jacket or outfit (Chinese: 列宁装; pinyin: lièníng zhuāng), became a popular item of clothing amongst Chinese women. Named after Soviet leader Vladimir Lenin, the Lenin suit had a double-breasted design and came in several varieties, making it both respectable in appearance and fairly versatile.

Another well-known item of clothing for women in this era was the bulaji, a dress that was Soviet-inspired both in name and style.

The dual-purpose jacket was one of the most common and recognisable styles for Chinese women in the 1950s and 1960s, alongside the Lenin jacket, military-style clothing and work clothing. These styles had socialist and labour connotations and thus were regarded as safe options to wear, given that clothing seen as ‘bourgeois’ or ‘anti-revolutionary’, such as Western styles and cheongsam, were heavily criticised.

=== 1960s ===
During the Cultural Revolution, almost anything seen as part of traditional culture would lead to problems with the Communist Red Guards. Items that attracted dangerous attention if seen in public included jeans, high heels, Western-style coats, ties, jewelry, cheongsams, and long hair. These items were regarded as symbols of the bourgeois lifestyle, which represented wealth. Citizens had to avoid them or suffer serious consequences such as torture or beatings by the guards. A number of these items were thrown into the streets to embarrass the citizens.

A notable case is that of Wang Guangmei, politician and wife of Liu Shaoqi, who was condemned during the Cultural Revolution for wearing ‘bourgeois’ clothing - cheongsam, high heels and pearls - during a state visit to Indonesia in 1963. She was subsequently interrogated during a struggle session at Tsinghua University in 1967 and sentenced to twelve years in prison.

=== Modern era ===
Following the relaxation of communist clothing standards in the late 70s, the way the Chinese dressed and the fashion trends of the country changed drastically. Contemporary urban clothing seems to have developed a focus on brand names. In major urban centers, especially Shanghai, an increasingly western look is preferred, and there is an emphasis on formal wear over casual wear for adults on the streets. Teenagers prefer brand names and western clothing. Children usually wear clothes decorated with cartoon characters. However, there is also an effort to revive traditional clothing forms such as the hanfu by the hanfu movement. At an Asia-Pacific Economic Cooperation summit in Shanghai in 2001, the host presented silk-embroidered tangzhuang jackets as the Chinese traditional national costume.

As smartphones and tablet computers have become increasingly popular, they are some of the most popular ways people gain access to fashion information, along with the Internet and fashion magazines. As for buying clothing, brick-and-mortar stores are still the predominant choice, taking up more than half of the market share.

== See also ==
- Hanfu footwear

== Sources ==
- Gernet, Jacques (1962). Daily Life in China on the Eve of the Mongol Invasion, 1250–1276. Stanford University Press. ISBN 0-8047-0720-0.
- Nicholson, Geoff (2006). Sex Collectors. New York: Simon & Schuster. ISBN 978-0-7432-6587-4.
