= Xiuzhou, Jiaxing =

Xiuzhou 秀洲区
- District
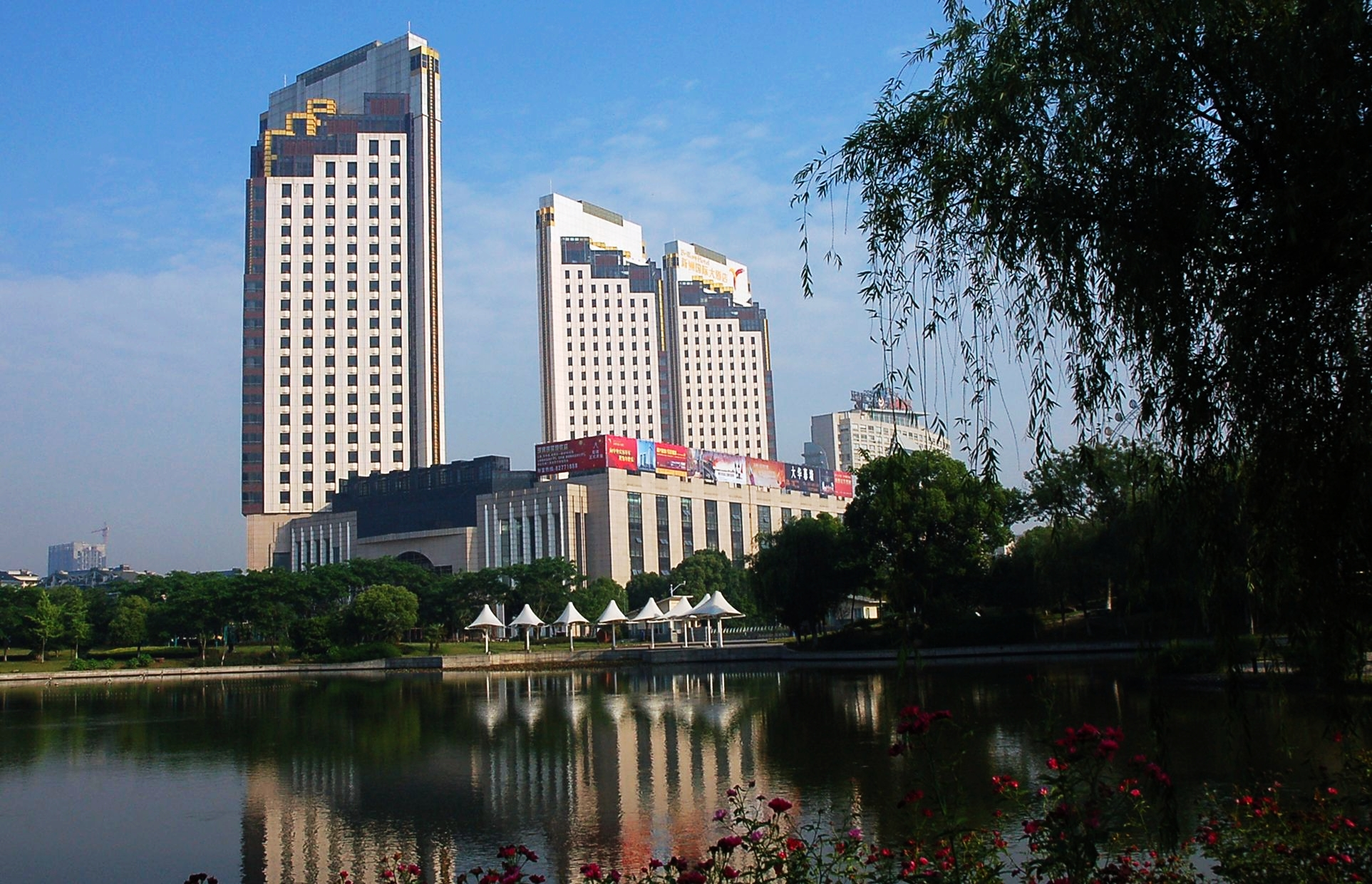

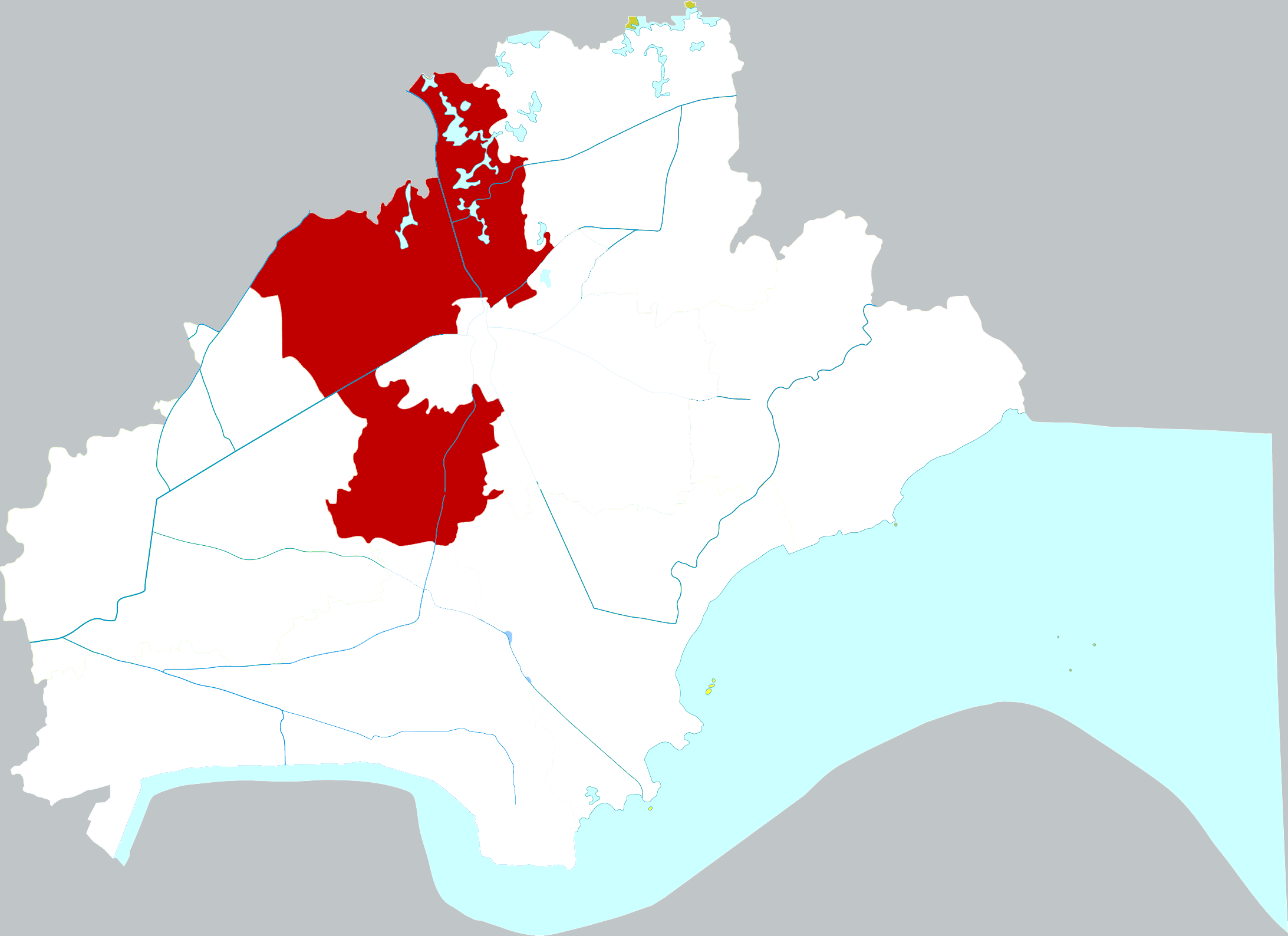
- Location of Xiuzhou District within Jiaxing

- Location of the seat in Zhejiang
- Coordinates: 30°46′N 120°42′E
- Country: People's Republic of China
- Province: Zhejiang
- Prefecture-level city: Jiaxing

Area
  - Total: 542 km^{2} (209 sq mi)

Population
  - Total: 500,000
  - Density: 920/km^{2} (2,400/sq mi)
- Time zone: UTC+8 (China Standard)
- Website: www.xiuzhou.gov.cn

Xiuzhou District (Chinese: 秀洲区; pinyin: Xiùzhōu Qū) is a district in Jiaxing, Zhejiang, China, bordering Jiangsu province to the north. There is 90 km (56 mi) to central Shanghai in the northeast, 80 km (50 mi) to Hangzhou in the southwest and 70 km (43 mi) to Suzhou in the north. It is an important urban district of Jiaxing city. The total of Xiouzhou District is 542 km^{2} (209 sq mi), population of 500,000 and it is composed of five towns, four streets and one provincial E.D. Zone (Economical Development Zone).

Xiuzhou district takes its name from the ancient settlement, which was founded in the Spring and Autumn period, that became Jiaxing. It was named Xiuzhou district in 1999. Xiuzhou has long history and deep culture base. The Grand Canal of China, Changhong Bridge, Baoshu Pavilion and so on are the famous historical resorts. The famous Qing Dynasty scholar and poet Zhu Yizun, the biologist Cheng Shixiang, and the doctor Jiang Zhixin are all personalities in its history. Based upon the beautiful waters of this region area together with its traditional culture, the folk painting here is colourful and full of passion for life. The Xiuzhou district has achieved the honour of being called by the title of “Hometown of Modern Folk Painting in China”, named by the Ministry of Culture.

Xiuzhou is known as "a land of milk and honey, the hometown of silk". With the development of its society and economy, Xiuzhou has been transforming from an agricultural area into an industrial area. It has been designated a "State Advanced Technology Zone", "National Advanced Physical Education Area", "National Advanced Social Security Area", "Provincial Physical Culture District", and "Provincial Culture District". In 2006, its gross domestic product (GDP) and state budget revenue reached RMB 10.92 billion and RMB 1.14 billion, respectively, representing increases of 14.1% and 24.6%. The proportions of the three economic sectors were 8.6%, 61.0%, and 30.4%, respectively.

Xiuzhou district enjoys a favourable location and convenient transportation, and as a result has experienced rapid growth across many industries, particularly textiles. The expressway network in Xiuzhou is characterized as “3-horizontal, 3-bridge” and is made up by five expressways including Hu-Hang-Yong, Zha-Jia-Su expressway and Shen-Jia-Hu, Huangzhou baycross-ocean bridge expressway which are under construction. Moreover, Shanghai-Hangzhou railway, 320 national highway and the Grand Canal of China are crossing the district and connecting to Jiangsu, Zhejiang, Anhui and Shanghai four provinces and cities. All towns of Xiuzhou connect to the expressway in 15 minutes and enjoy “one hour transportation circle” to large cities around. The traffic network makrs? Xiuzhou closely integrate with Shanghai and Hangzhou.

== Administrative divisions ==
Subdistricts:

- Xincheng Subdistrict (新城街道), Jiabei Subdistrict (嘉北街道), Tanghui Subdistrict (塘汇街道), Gaozhao Subdistrict (高照街道)

Towns:

- Wangjiangjing (王江泾镇), Wangdian (王店镇), Xincheng (新塍镇), Honghe (洪合镇), Youchegang (油车港镇)
