= Jiaxing =

Jiaxing 嘉兴市 Kashing
- Prefecture-level city
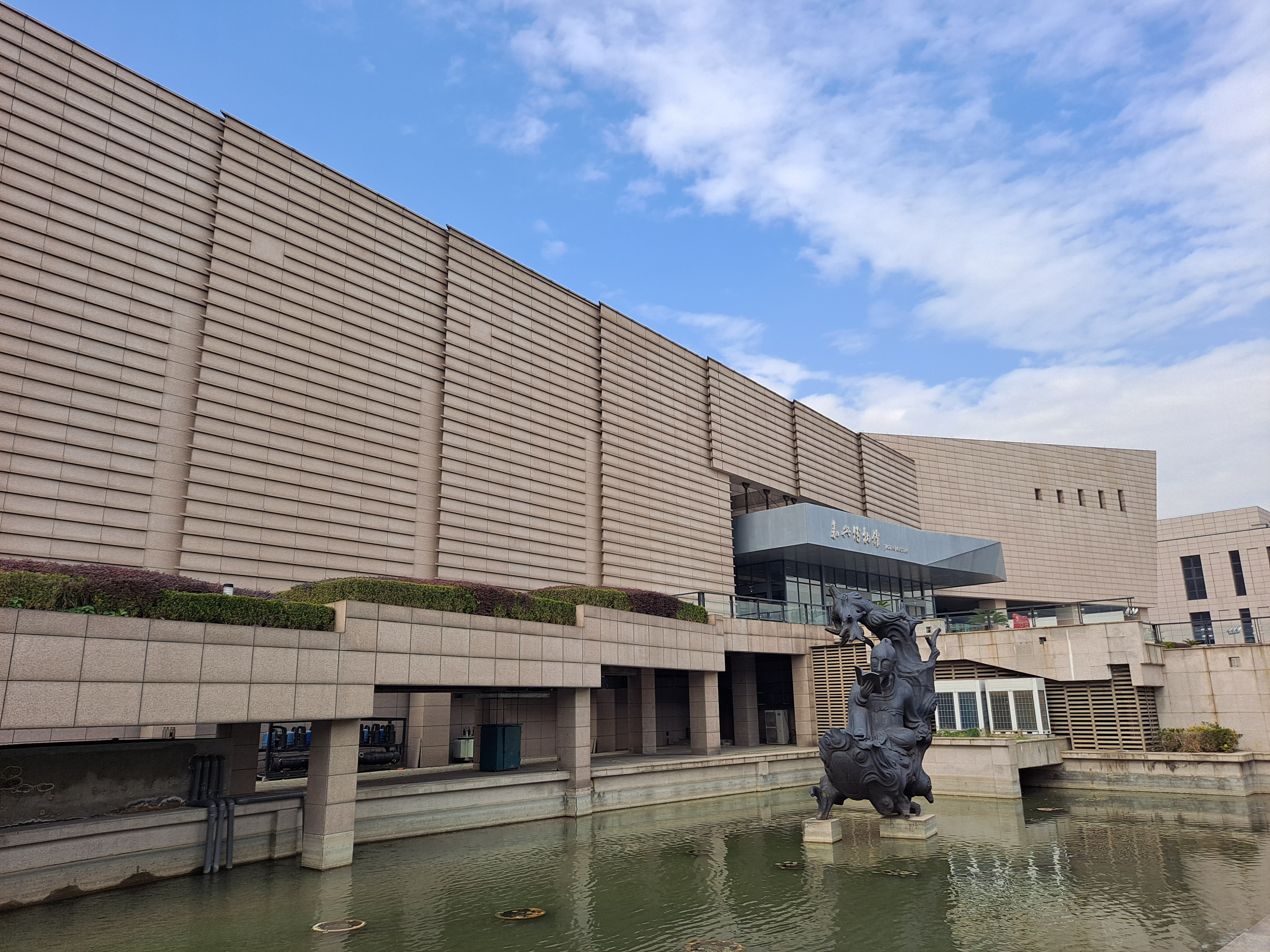
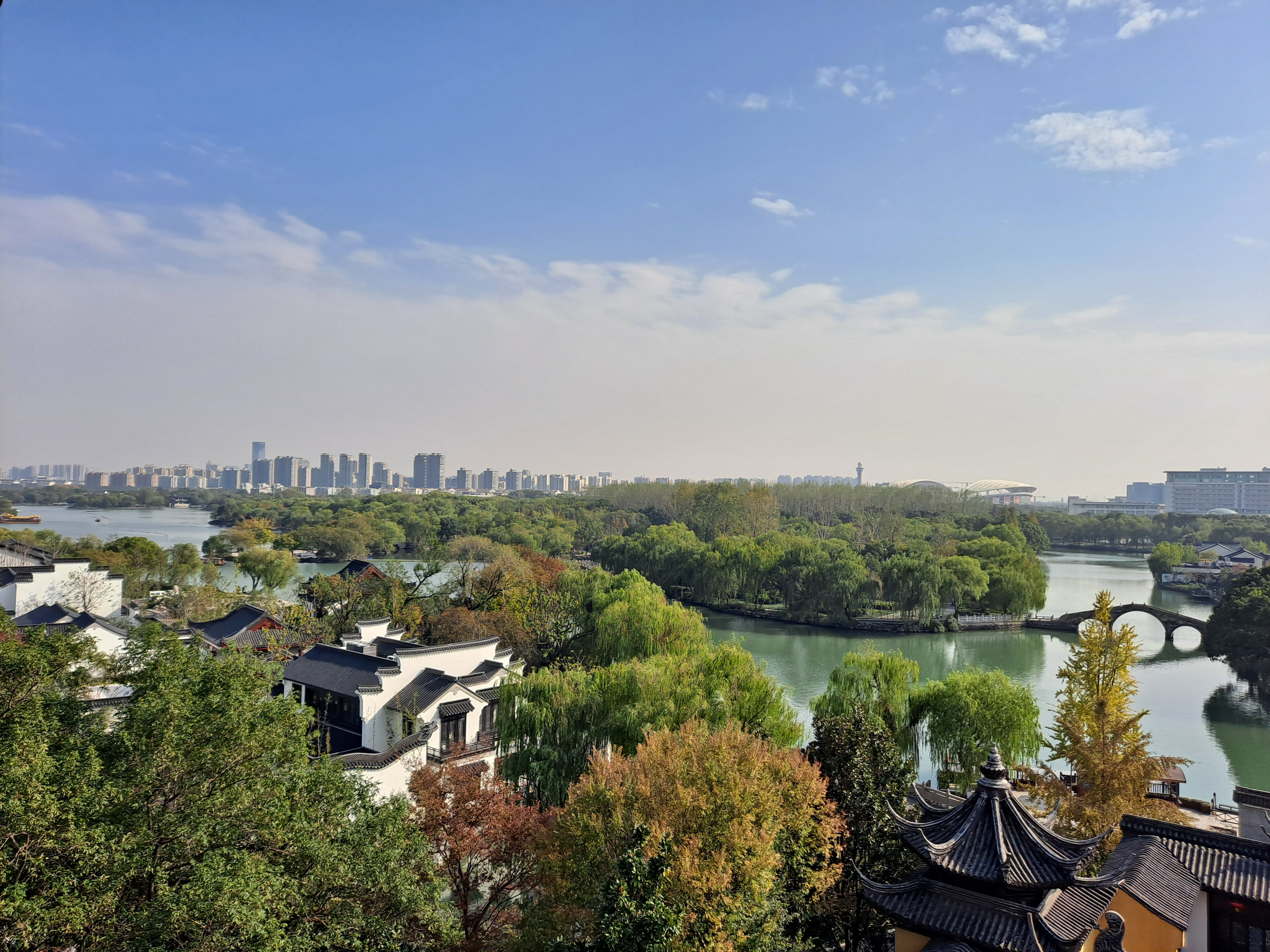
- Zicheng Yuehe Historic District Three Pagodas Civil Square Views from Pavilion of Mist and Rain Haogu Pagoda Jiaxing Museum South Lake

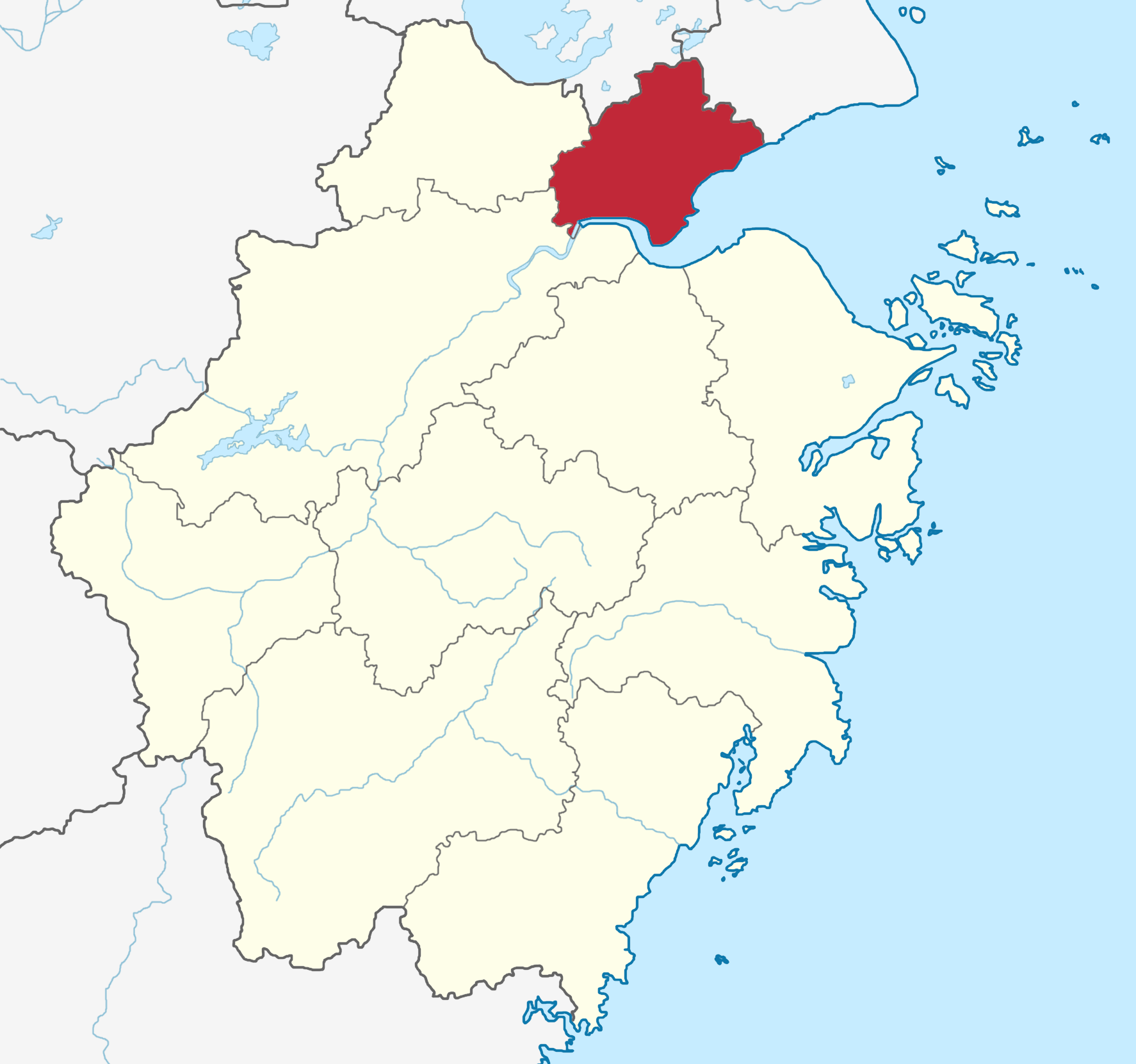
- Location of Jiaxing City jurisdiction in Zhejiang
- Interactive map of Jiaxing
- Location in eastern China Jiaxing (China)
- Coordinates (Jiaxing municipal government): 30°44′49″N 120°45′22″E
- Country: People's Republic of China
- Province: Zhejiang
- County-level divisions: 7
- Township-level divisions: 75
- Municipal seat: Nanhu District

Government
  - CPC Secretary: Zhang Bing
  - Mayor: Mao Hongfang

Area
  - Prefecture-level city: 4,008.76 km^{2} (1,547.79 sq mi)
  - Urban: 986.9 km^{2} (381.0 sq mi)
  - Metro: 986.9 km^{2} (381.0 sq mi)

Population (2020 census)
  - Prefecture-level city: 5,400,868
  - Density: 1,347.27/km^{2} (3,489.40/sq mi)
  - Urban: 1,518,654
  - Urban density: 1,539/km^{2} (3,986/sq mi)
  - Metro: 1,518,654
  - Metro density: 1,539/km^{2} (3,986/sq mi)

GDP
  - Prefecture-level city: CN¥ 757 billion US$ 106.3 billion
  - Per capita: CN¥ 140,176; US$ 19,683
- Time zone: UTC+8 (China Standard)
- Area code: 573
- ISO 3166 code: CN-ZJ-04
- License Plate Prefix: 浙F
- Website: www.jiaxing.gov.cn

Jiaxing
- "Jiaxing", as written in Chinese
- Simplified Chinese: 嘉兴
- Traditional Chinese: 嘉興
- Wu: Gāshīng [kɑɕiŋ]
- Postal: Kashing
Transcriptions
Standard Mandarin
- Hanyu Pinyin: Jiāxīng
- Wade–Giles: Chia-hsing
Wu
- Romanization: Gāshīng [kɑɕiŋ]
Yue: Cantonese
- Jyutping: gaa^{1}hing^{1}
Southern Min
- Hokkien POJ: Ka-Hing

Jiaxing (simplified Chinese: 嘉兴; traditional Chinese: 嘉興; pinyin: Jiāxīng; Wade–Giles: Chia-hsing), alternately romanized as Kashing, is a prefecture-level city in northern Zhejiang province, China. Lying on the Grand Canal of China, Jiaxing borders Hangzhou to the southwest, Huzhou to the west, Shanghai to the northeast, and the province of Jiangsu to the north. As of the 2020 census, its population was 5,400,868 and its built-up (or metro) area, made up of 2 urban districts was home to 1,518,654 inhabitants.

== Administration ==
The prefecture-level city of Jiaxing administers 7 county-level divisions, including 2 districts, 3 county-level cities and 2 counties.

Map
Subdivision	Hanzi	Pinyin
Nanhu District	南湖区	Nánhú Qū
Xiuzhou District	秀洲区	Xiùzhōu Qū
Jiashan County	嘉善县	Jiāshàn Xiàn
Haiyan County	海盐县	Hǎiyán Xiàn
Haining	海宁市	Hǎiníng Shì
Pinghu	平湖市	Pínghú Shì
Tongxiang	桐乡市	Tóngxiāng Shì

These are further divided into 75 township-level divisions, including 60 towns, 2 townships and 13 subdistricts.

== History ==
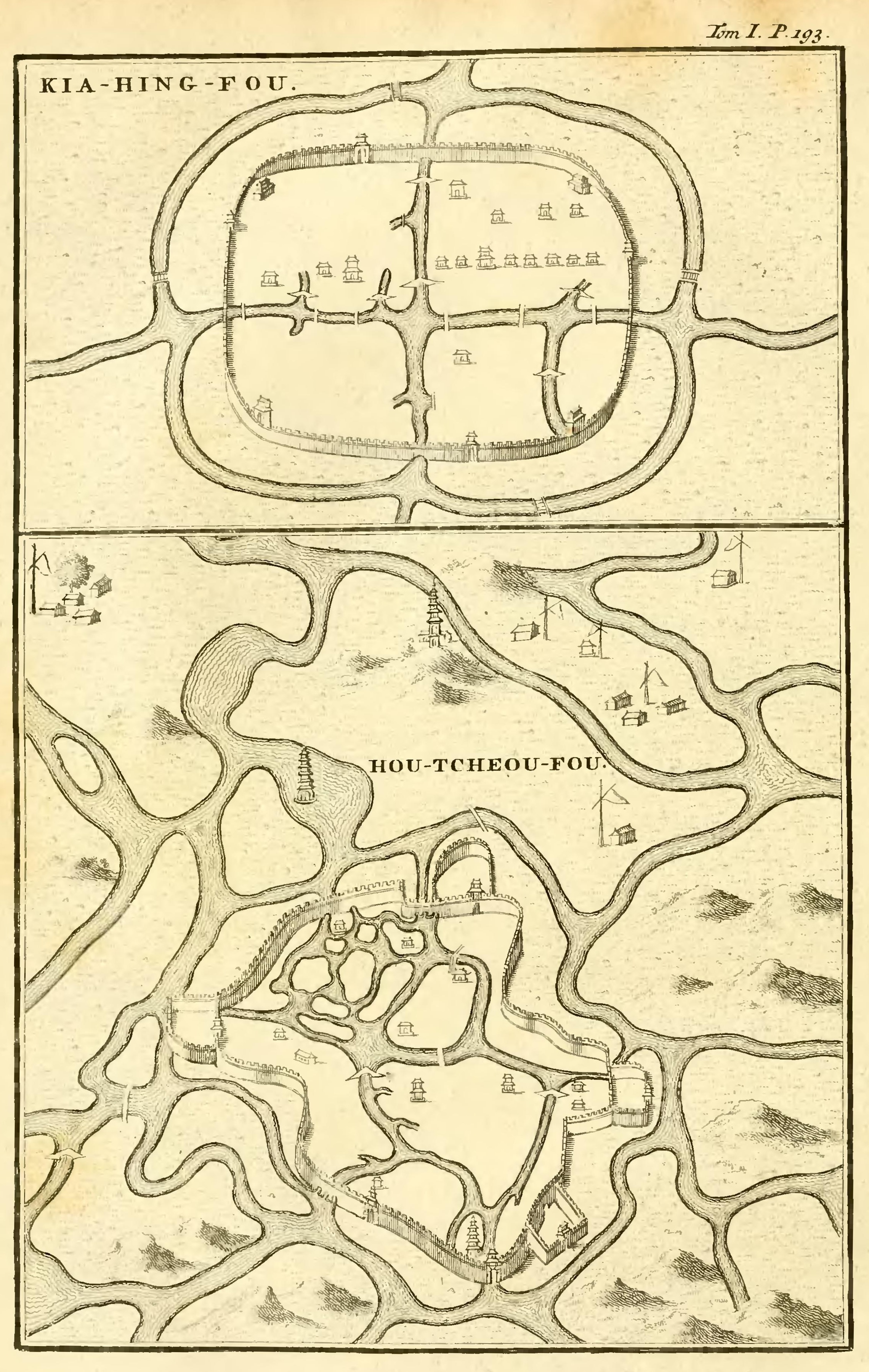
The map of "Kia-hing-fou" and "Hou-tcheou-fou" in Du Halde's 1736 Description of China, based on accounts from Jesuit missionaries.

Jiaxing is the birthplace of the Majiabang Culture in the Neolithic Age. Residents engaged in farming, animal husbandry, fishing and hunting 7,000 years ago.

=== Known as a place ===
- Spring and Autumn period: Jiaxing is known as Zuili (Drunken Plums) and is an important city in the state of Yuè.

=== Known as a county ===
- 210 BC: Qin Shi Huang changed the name of Jiaxing from Changshui District (長水縣) to Youquan (由拳縣).
- 231: Wild rice (野稻) of Jiaxing informed Sun Quan of the Kingdom of Wu that there was a sign of auspice, so Sun changed Youchuan to Hexing District (禾興縣). This is why Jiaxing's abbreviation is He. Sun also changed his era name to Jiahe (嘉禾) in the following year.
- January 242: Sun He was made the crown prince. Because of the naming taboo, Jiahe was changed to Jiaxing.

=== Known as a prefecture ===
- 938: (Later Jin of the Five Dynasties): Xiu Prefecture (秀州) established
- 1117: (Song dynasty): Jiahe District (嘉禾郡)
- 1429: (Ming dynasty): Xiushui District (秀水縣) was established northwest of Jiaxing.
- Early 1900s (the Republic of China): Xiushui and Jiaxing were combined into Jiahe County
- 1914: Reverted to Jiaxing County (because there's a Jiahe in Hunan)
- 1921: Chinese Communist Party founded at the South Lake in Jiaxing.
- 1926: Following the defection of Zhejiang civil governor Xia Chao to the Kuomintang during the Northern Expedition, the army of warlord Sun Chuanfang completely defeats Xia's largely untrained army at Jiaxing. Xia is captured and executed shortly thereafter.
- 1949 − 1958, 1979 (PRC): Upgraded to a city
- 1981: Old Jiaxing County merged into the city
- 1983: Upgraded to prefecture-level city

== Climate ==
Climate data for Jiaxing, elevation 5 m (16 ft), (1991–2020 normals, extremes 1977–present)
Month	Jan	Feb	Mar	Apr	May	Jun	Jul	Aug	Sep	Oct	Nov	Dec	Year
Record high °C (°F)	22.4 (72.3)	28.3 (82.9)	32.1 (89.8)	33.9 (93.0)	36.1 (97.0)	37.2 (99.0)	40.0 (104.0)	41.1 (106.0)	38.5 (101.3)	33.6 (92.5)	29.1 (84.4)	24.0 (75.2)	41.1 (106.0)
Mean daily maximum °C (°F)	8.3 (46.9)	10.6 (51.1)	14.9 (58.8)	20.8 (69.4)	25.7 (78.3)	28.4 (83.1)	32.9 (91.2)	32.3 (90.1)	28.1 (82.6)	23.2 (73.8)	17.5 (63.5)	11.1 (52.0)	21.1 (70.1)
Daily mean °C (°F)	4.5 (40.1)	6.5 (43.7)	10.4 (50.7)	15.9 (60.6)	21.1 (70.0)	24.5 (76.1)	28.8 (83.8)	28.4 (83.1)	24.3 (75.7)	18.9 (66.0)	13.1 (55.6)	6.8 (44.2)	16.9 (62.5)
Mean daily minimum °C (°F)	1.6 (34.9)	3.2 (37.8)	6.8 (44.2)	12.0 (53.6)	17.3 (63.1)	21.6 (70.9)	25.5 (77.9)	25.4 (77.7)	21.2 (70.2)	15.4 (59.7)	9.4 (48.9)	3.5 (38.3)	13.6 (56.4)
Record low °C (°F)	−11.9 (10.6)	−6.4 (20.5)	−3.0 (26.6)	0.5 (32.9)	6.9 (44.4)	13.2 (55.8)	17.9 (64.2)	18.6 (65.5)	11.2 (52.2)	2.1 (35.8)	−3.1 (26.4)	−9.0 (15.8)	−11.9 (10.6)
Average precipitation mm (inches)	80.3 (3.16)	74.3 (2.93)	107.8 (4.24)	92.2 (3.63)	104.4 (4.11)	211.9 (8.34)	140.7 (5.54)	174.2 (6.86)	105.0 (4.13)	57.8 (2.28)	61.8 (2.43)	54.7 (2.15)	1,265.1 (49.8)
Average precipitation days (≥ 0.1 mm)	11.6	11.0	13.5	12.4	11.9	14.7	12.0	12.4	9.7	7.5	9.8	8.8	135.3
Average snowy days	3.1	2.3	0.6	0.1	0	0	0	0	0	0	0.2	0.9	7.2
Average relative humidity (%)	79	77	77	75	76	83	80	81	81	78	79	77	79
Mean monthly sunshine hours	110.1	113.1	134.8	160.6	171.9	132.4	210.6	205.8	160.1	158.3	129.3	126.9	1,813.9
Percentage possible sunshine	34	36	36	41	40	31	49	51	44	45	41	40	41
Source: China Meteorological Administration all-time extreme temperature

== Economy ==
Industry is the main economic driver to the city's economy, contributing 47% to its GDP in 2015. Jiaxing is also well known as the 'hometown of silk', hence it is a famous producer of textiles and woolens. It is one of the world's largest exporters of leather goods. There are mechanical, chemical and electronic industries there.

Jiaxing is an important energy base in East China. Qinshan Nuclear Power Plant, the first self-designed nuclear power station in China, and Fangjiashan Nuclear Power Plant (under construction) are located in Haiyan County.

=== Jiaxing Export Processing Zone ===
Established in 2003, Jiaxing Export Processing Zone is a state-level export processing zone approved by State Council. It has a built-up area of 2.98 km^{2}. Its development goal is to become the export processing base for IT, IC, mechanical and electrical, electronics and other high-tech industries.

Jiaxing has established a "Zongzi Cultural Ecological Preservation Area" in its southern suburbs. This initiative aims to protect the entire cultural ecosystem surrounding the traditional food, including the cultivation of specific glutinous rice varieties, bamboo leaf harvesting, and the transmission of wrapping techniques within communities.

== Healthcare ==
The First Hospital of Jiaxing is located in the area.

== Tourism ==
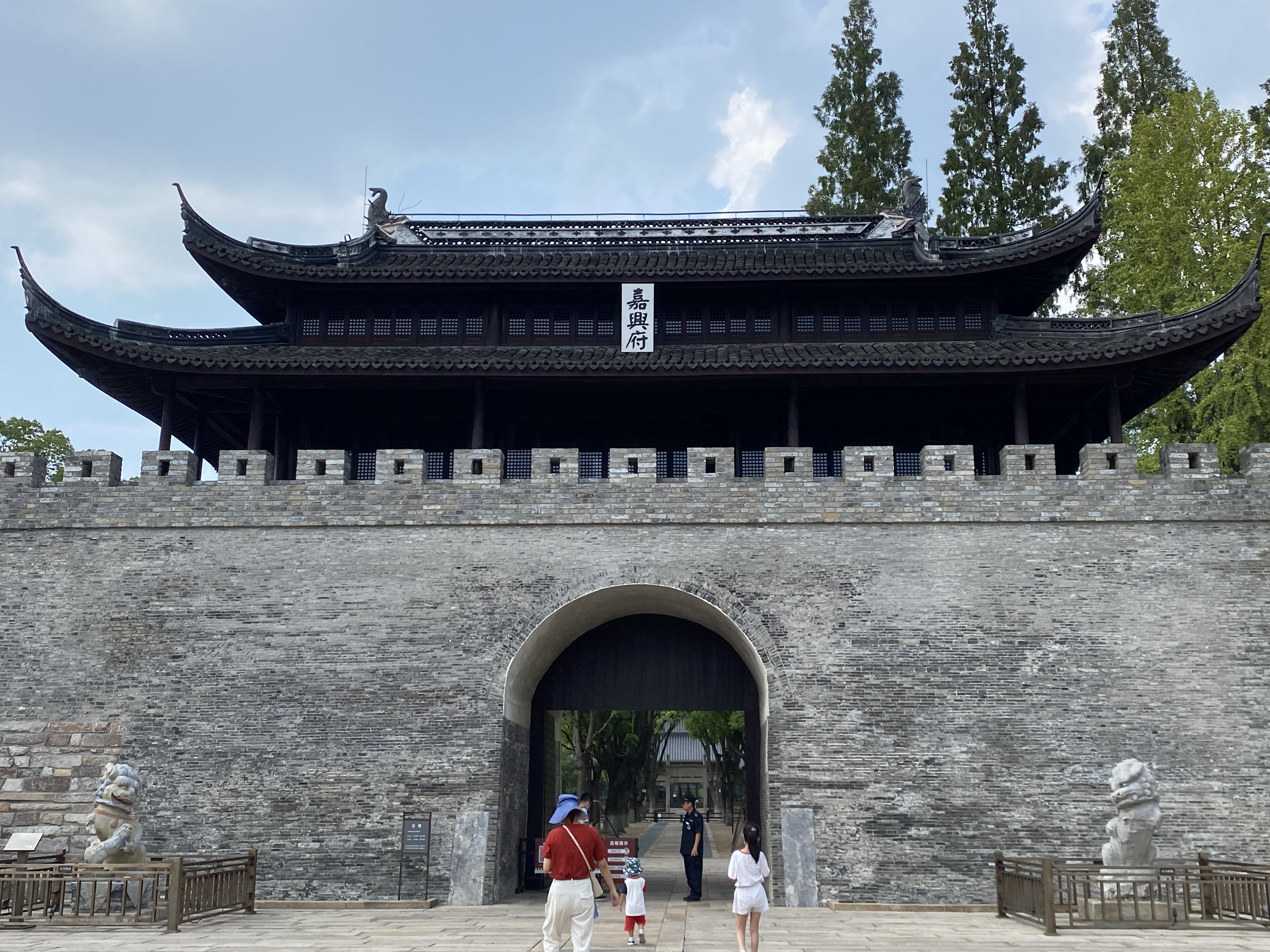
The main gate of the Zicheng, lit. "citadel", of Jiaxing

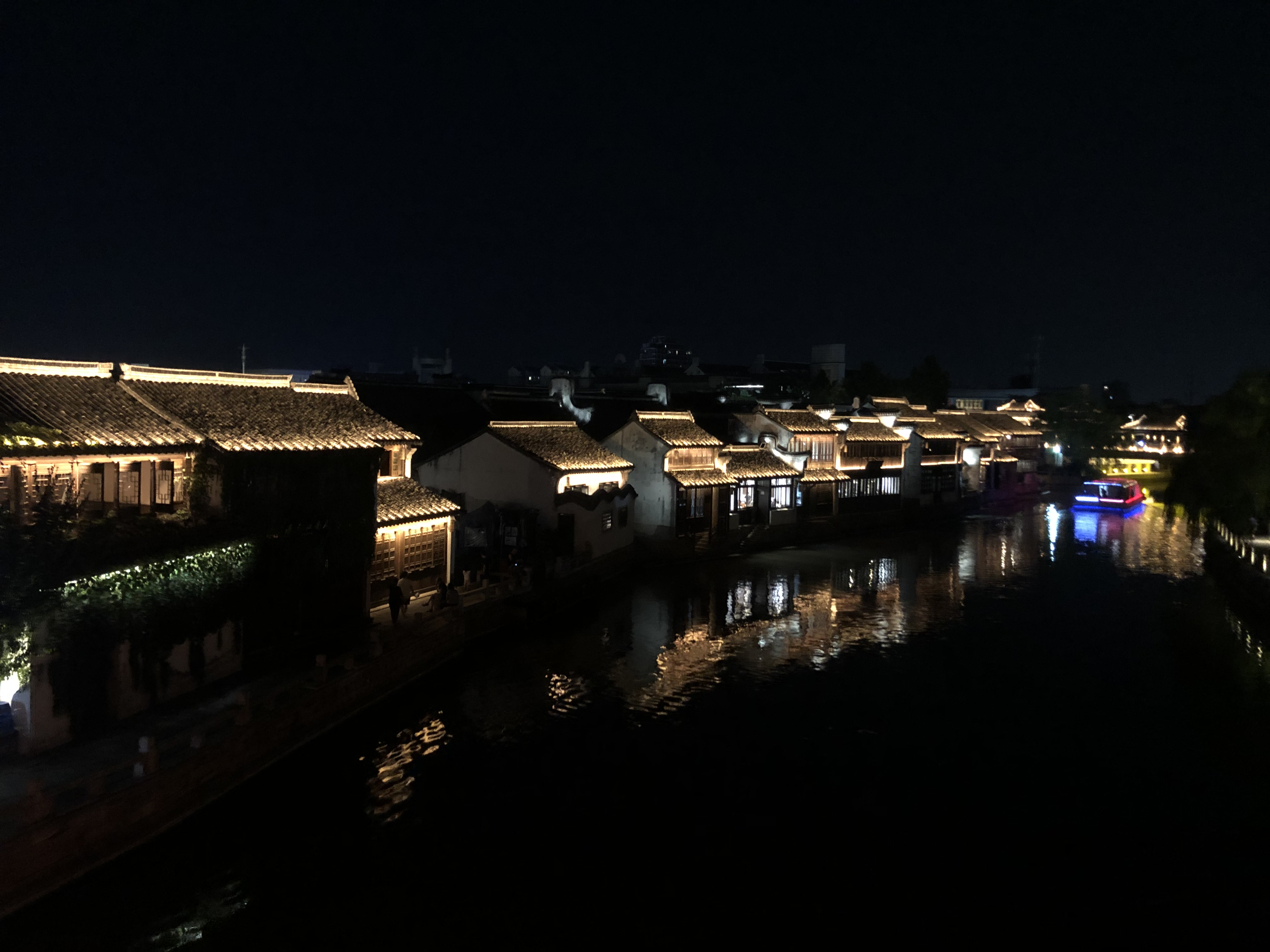
Yuehe Street

South Lake, to the south-east of the old walled city, has been a popular tourist site for centuries. The Chinese Communist Party was officially founded on a boat in the lake, after the delegates to its first congress adjourned their meeting in Shanghai and reconvened here. As a result, the lake is now a popular destination for Communist Party "education" tours.

Within the city proper, the Zicheng (citadel) of Jiaxing was for two millennia the fortified nucleus of the walled city, though only fragmented remains now survive from the imperial era. The main gate was rebuilt in 1990. Jiaxing is one of the very few cities in south-east China that retains any vestige of a citadel. A number of famous writers' homes also survive in the old walled city, as well as a Carmelite abbey and Gothic abbey church built in 1902.

Meiwan Street and Yuehe Street (Zhongji Road and surrounds) are two restored neighbourhoods to the south and north of the old city respectively, located near the city moat, canals and lakes. Literally "Prunus bay street" and "moon river street" respectively, these two neighbourhoods combine restored historic buildings and newly landscaped gardens. Meiwan Street features buildings in the style of private residences of prominent families, and is the location of Kim Koo's refuge, a house significant in the history of the Korean independence movement, and a family shrine of the Qian family, a prominent local family. By contrast, Yuehe Street features artisan workshops and street food stores. In January 2022, Yuehe Street was named the "first provincial night cultural and tourist concentration area".

Wuzhen and Xitang, two townships within Jiaxing city limits, feature preserved and restored houses situated along small canals that are evocative of typical canal towns of the region. They are popular tourist destinations and filming locations.

== Transportation ==
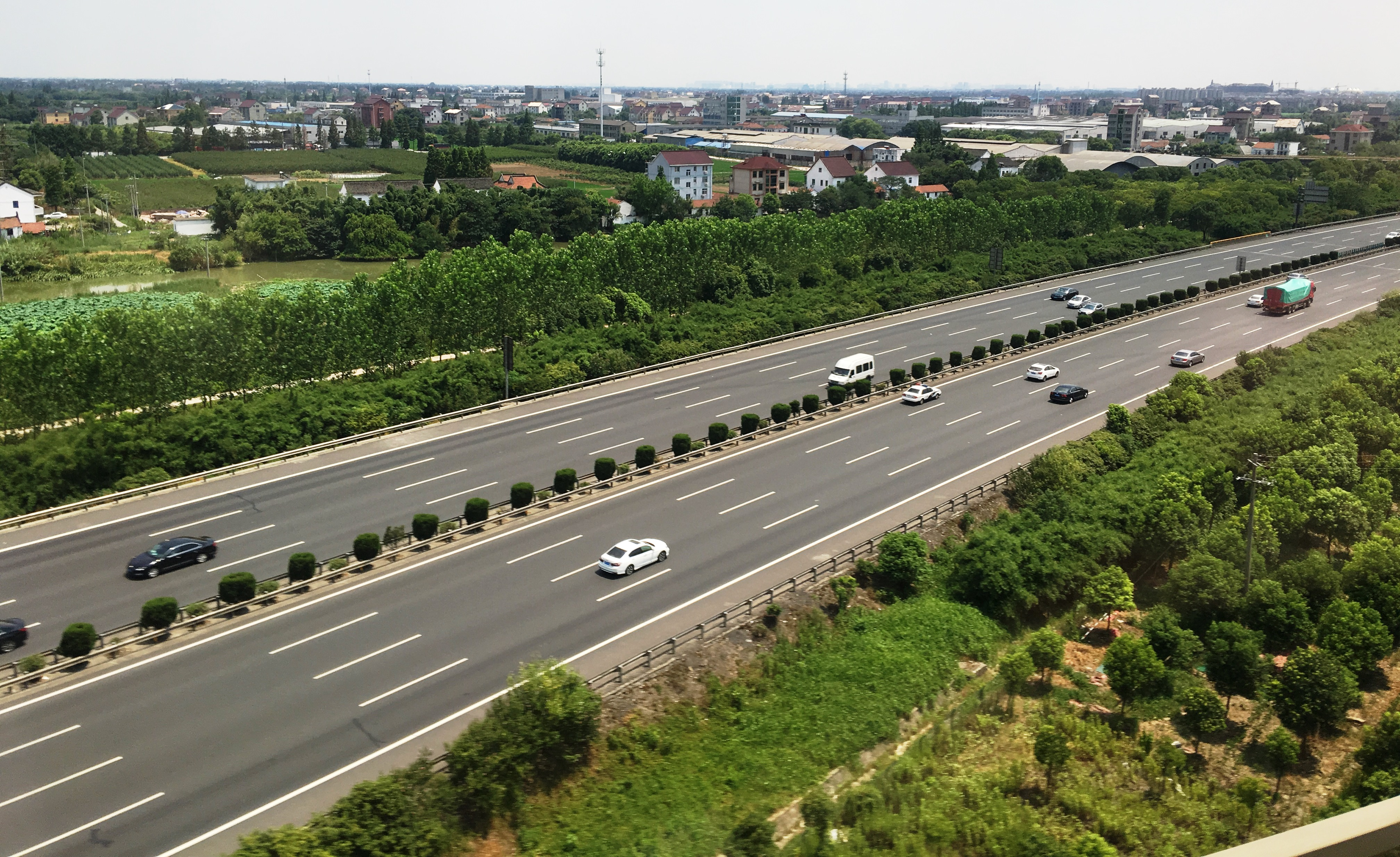
View of the G60 Highway from the Shanghai-Hangzhou high speed railway in Jiashan County

The city is served by two railway stations: Jiaxing railway station, on the Shanghai–Kunming railway, and Jiaxing South railway station on the high speed Shanghai–Hangzhou Passenger Railway. The city is served by two long-distance bus stations: Jiaxing North Bus Station and the new Jiaxing Transportation Center. Jiaxing is on the G92 Hangzhou Bay Ring Expressway, G60 Shanghai–Kunming Expressway and China National Highway 320.

The city is served by one airport: Jiaxing Nanhu Airport (formerly known as Jiaxing Air Base before being converted to a public-use airport).

== Language ==
Jiaxing dialect is a Northern Wu dialect in the Sujiahu dialect grouping. As such, it is a sister dialect of both Shanghainese and Suzhou dialect, and is easily intelligible with both. It is not mutually intelligible with Mandarin or other varieties of Chinese, such as Cantonese, Hokkien or Hakka.

== Religion ==
Local people believe in Buddhism, Taoism, Catholicism and Protestantism. Jiaxing Catholic Church and Jiaxing Vincent Abbey are well-known Roman Catholic Churches in Jiaxing.

== Notable people ==
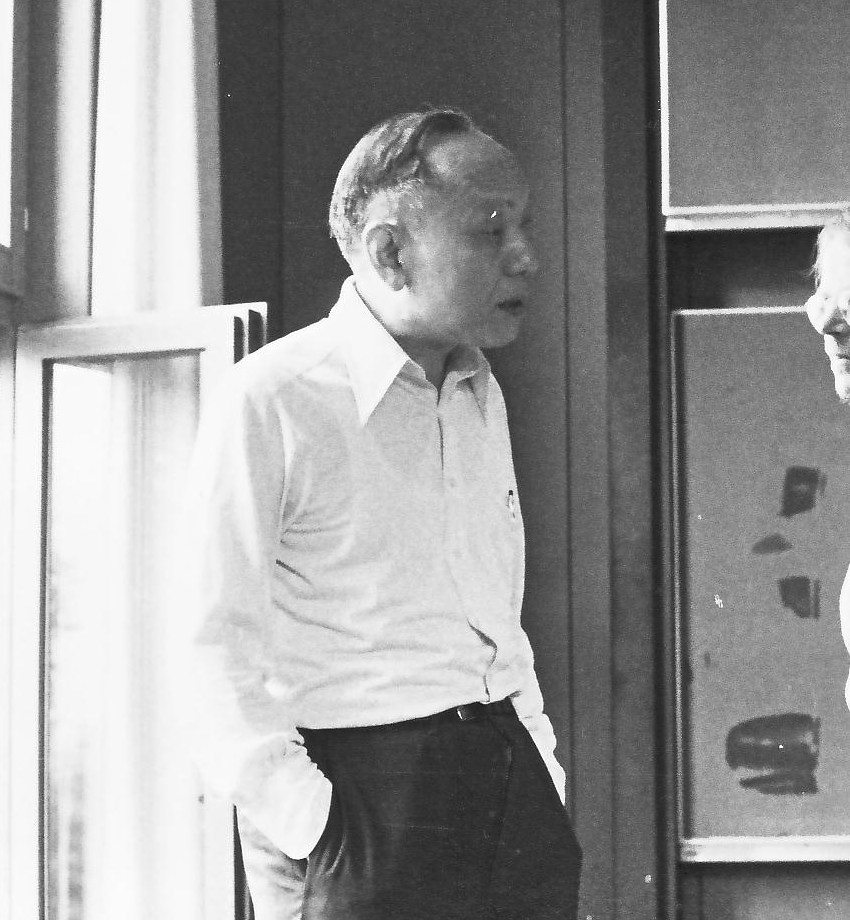
Shiing-Shen Chern

- Zhu Yizun (朱彝尊), scholar and poet
- Wang Guowei (王國維), scholar, writer and poet
- Xu Zhimo (徐志摩), poet
- Shiing-Shen Chern (陳省身), mathematician
- Mao Dun (茅盾), novelist, critic, journalist
- Zhang Yuanji (张元济), publisher at Commercial Press
- Zhang Zhongjun (张钟俊), scientist
- Xu Kuangdi (徐匡迪), scientist, politician
- Zhu Shenghao (朱生豪), translator
- Zhang Leping (张乐平), cartoonist, creator of Sanmao
- Yang Borun (楊伯潤), poet, calligrapher, painter
- Yi Ling (伊玲), calligrapher and art critic
- Jin Yong (金庸), novelist
- Fan Xiping (范西屏), Go player
- Miao Huixin, artist
- Shen Junru (沈钧儒), politician, patriot
- Wu Outing (吴藕汀), poet, painter, culture scholar
- Zhou Hanming, mathematician
- Wang Yilyu (王懿律), Olympic champion

== See also ==
- List of twin towns and sister cities in China

== Bibliography ==
- Jordan, Donald A. (1976). The Northern Expedition: China's National Revolution of 1926–1928. University Press of Hawaiʻi. ISBN 978-0-8248-0352-0.
- Smith, Stephen Anthony (2000). A Road Is Made: Communism in Shanghai, 1920–1927. Honolulu: University of Hawaiʻi. ISBN 978-0-8248-2314-6.
