= Shiu-Yuen Cheng =

Hong Kong mathematician

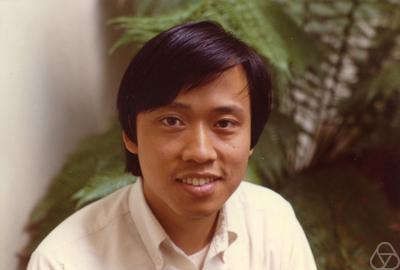
Shiu-Yuen Cheng in 1977

Shiu-Yuen Cheng (鄭紹遠) is a Hong Kong mathematician. He is currently the Chair Professor of Mathematics at the Hong Kong University of Science and Technology. Cheng received his Ph.D. in 1974, under the supervision of Shiing-Shen Chern, from University of California at Berkeley. Cheng then spent some years as a post-doctoral fellow and assistant professor at Princeton University and the State University of New York at Stony Brook. Then he became a full professor at University of California at Los Angeles. Cheng chaired the Mathematics departments of both the Chinese University of Hong Kong and the Hong Kong University of Science and Technology in the 1990s. In 2004, he became the Dean of Science at HKUST. In 2012, he became a fellow of the American Mathematical Society.

He is well known for contributions to differential geometry and partial differential equations, including Cheng's eigenvalue comparison theorem, Cheng's maximal diameter theorem, and a number of works with Shing-Tung Yau. Many of Cheng and Yau's works formed part of the corpus of work for which Yau was awarded the Fields Medal in 1982. As of 2020, Cheng's most recent research work was published in 1996.

== Technical contributions ==
=== Gradient estimates and their applications ===
In 1975, Shing-Tung Yau found a novel gradient estimate for solutions of second-order elliptic partial differential equations on certain complete Riemannian manifolds. Cheng and Yau were able to localize Yau's estimate by making use of a method developed by Eugenio Calabi.^{[CY75]} The result, known as the Cheng–Yau gradient estimate, is ubiquitous in the field of geometric analysis. As a consequence, Cheng and Yau were able to show the existence of an eigenfunction, corresponding to the first eigenvalue, of the Laplace-Beltrami operator on a complete Riemannian manifold.

Cheng and Yau applied the same methodology to understand spacelike hypersurfaces of Minkowski space and the geometry of hypersurfaces in affine space.^{[CY76a]}^{[CY86]} A particular application of their results is a Bernstein theorem for closed spacelike hypersurfaces of Minkowski space whose mean curvature is zero; any such hypersurface must be a plane.^{[CY76a]}

In 1916, Hermann Weyl found a differential identity for the geometric data of a convex surface in Euclidean space. By applying the maximum principle, he was able to control the extrinsic geometry in terms of the intrinsic geometry. Cheng and Yau generalized this to the context of hypersurfaces in Riemannian manifolds.^{[CY77b]}

=== The Minkowski problem and the Monge-Ampère equation ===
Any strictly convex closed hypersurface in the Euclidean space ℝ^{n + 1} can be naturally considered as an embedding of the n-dimensional sphere, via the Gauss map. The Minkowski problem asks whether an arbitrary smooth and positive function on the n-dimensional sphere can be realized as the scalar curvature of the Riemannian metric induced by such an embedding. This was resolved in 1953 by Louis Nirenberg, in the case that n is equal to two. In 1976, Cheng and Yau resolved the problem in general.^{[CY76b]}

By the use of the Legendre transformation, solutions of the Monge-Ampère equation also provide convex hypersurfaces of Euclidean space; the scalar curvature of the intrinsic metric is prescribed by the right-hand sided of the Monge-Ampère equation. As such, Cheng and Yau were able to use their resolution of the Minkowski problem to obtain information about solutions of Monge-Ampère equations.^{[CY77a]} As a particular application, they obtained the first general existence and uniqueness theory for the boundary-value problem for the Monge-Ampère equation. Luis Caffarelli, Nirenberg, and Joel Spruck later developed more flexible methods to deal with the same problem.

== Major publications ==
C75.	Shiu-Yuen Cheng. Eigenvalue comparison theorems and its geometric applications. Math. Z. 143 (1975), no. 3, 289–297. doi:10.1007/BF01214381

CY75.	S.Y. Cheng and S.T. Yau. Differential equations on Riemannian manifolds and their geometric applications. Comm. Pure Appl. Math. 28 (1975), no. 3, 333–354. doi:10.1002/cpa.3160280303

C76.	Shiu-Yuen Cheng. Eigenfunctions and nodal sets. Comment. Math. Helv. 51 (1976), no. 1, 43–55. doi:10.1007/BF02568142

CY76a.	Shiu-Yuen Cheng and Shing-Tung Yau. Maximal space-like hypersurfaces in the Lorentz-Minkowski spaces. Ann. of Math. (2) 104 (1976), no. 3, 407–419. doi:10.2307/1970963

CY76b.	Shiu-Yuen Cheng and Shing-Tung Yau. On the regularity of the solution of the n-dimensional Minkowski problem. Comm. Pure Appl. Math. 29 (1976), no. 5, 495–516. doi:10.1002/cpa.3160290504

CY77a.	Shiu-Yuen Cheng and Shing-Tung Yau. On the regularity of the Monge-Ampère equation det(∂^{2}u/∂x_{i}∂x_{j}) = F(x, u). Comm. Pure Appl. Math. 30 (1977), no. 1, 41–68. doi:10.1002/cpa.3160300104

CY77b.	Shiu-Yuen Cheng and Shing-Tung Yau. Hypersurfaces with constant scalar curvature. Math. Ann. 225 (1977), no. 3, 195–204. doi:10.1007/BF01425237

CY80.	Shiu-Yuen Cheng and Shing-Tung Yau. On the existence of a complete Kähler metric on noncompact complex manifolds and the regularity of Fefferman's equation. Comm. Pure Appl. Math. 33 (1980), no. 4, 507–544. doi:10.1002/cpa.3160330404

CY86.	Shiu-Yuen Cheng and Shing-Tung Yau. Complete affine hypersurfaces. I. The completeness of affine metrics. Comm. Pure Appl. Math. 39 (1986), no. 6, 839–866. doi:10.1002/cpa.3160390606
