= Michler =

Michler is a surname. Notable people with the name include:

- Rev. James R. Michler (b.1948), formerly senior associate pastor of St. Cecilia Parish in St. Louis
- Frank Michler Chapman (1864–1945), American ornithologist and pioneering
- Klaus Michler (born 1970), German field hockey player
- Robert E. Michler, American surgeon
- Ruth I. Michler (1967–2000), American mathematician
  - Ruth I. Michler Memorial Prize, annual prize in mathematics named in her honor
- Wilhelm Michler (1846–1889), German chemist

== See also ==
- Michler's ketone, is an organic compound with the formula of [(CH3)2NC6H4]2CO
- Michler's Palace
- Micheler
