= Alexandra Seceleanu =

Romanian mathematician

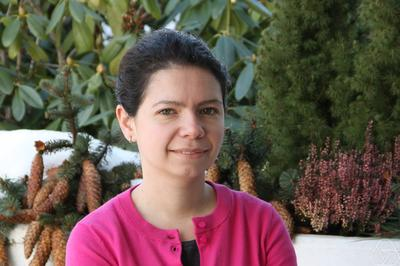
- Seceleanu at Oberwolfach, 2015
- Education: University of Bucharest; University of Illinois
- Awards: Ruth I. Michler Memorial Prize (2024-5)
- Scientific career
- Fields: Commutative algebra, algebraic geometry, computational algebra
- Workplaces: University of Nebraska–Lincoln
- Thesis: The Syzygy Theorem and the Weak Lefschetz Property (2011)
- Doctoral advisor: Phillip Griffith and Hal Schenck

Alexandra Seceleanu is a Romanian mathematician specializing in commutative algebra. She is an associate professor of mathematics at the University of Nebraska–Lincoln. She was awarded the 2024–2025 Ruth I. Michler Memorial Prize.

== Education and career ==
Seceleanu graduated from the University of Bucharest, and in 2005 obtained a master's degree in mathematics from the Bucharest Superior Normal School with a focus on algebra, geometry, and topology. She completed a Ph.D. at the University of Illinois in 2011, supervised by Phillip Griffith and Hal Schenck.

Seceleanu started working as a postdoctoral researcher at the University of Nebraska–Lincoln in 2011, where in 2015 she became an assistant professor, and in 2021 an associate professor. She is on the editorial board of the Journal of Commutative Algebra.

=== Research ===
Seceleanu's research within the field of commutative algebra concerns both theoretical and computational problems. She has an interest in algebraic geometry, in particular in how it can be studied via methods from homological algebra. She also works on computational algebra, and has contributed to Macaulay2.

== Recognition ==
In 2018 Seceleanu won the Harold & Esther Edgerton Junior Faculty Award, which is awarded annually by the University of Nebraska–Lincoln to a junior faculty member demonstrating "creative research, extraordinary teaching abilities, and academic promise". She was awarded the 2024-2025 Ruth I. Michler Memorial Prize. Since 2024 she holds a Milton Mohr Associate Professorship at the University of Nebraska–Lincoln.
