= Shi Yuguang =

Chinese mathematician

Shi Yuguang (Chinese: 史宇光; born 1969, Yinxian, Zhejiang) is a Chinese mathematician at Peking University. His areas of research are geometric analysis and differential geometry.

He was awarded the ICTP Ramanujan Prize in 2010, for "outstanding contributions to the geometry of complete (noncompact) Riemannian manifolds, specifically the positivity of quasi-local mass and rigidity of asymptotically hyperbolic manifolds."

He earned his Ph.D. from the Chinese Academy of Sciences in 1996 under the supervision of Ding Weiyue.

== Technical contributions ==
Shi is well-known for his foundational work with Luen-Fai Tam on compact and smooth Riemannian manifolds-with-boundary whose scalar curvature is nonnegative and whose boundary is mean-convex. In particular, if the manifold has a spin structure, and if each connected component of the boundary can be isometrically embedded as a strictly convex hypersurface in Euclidean space, then the average value of the mean curvature of each boundary component is less than or equal to the average value of the mean curvature of the corresponding hypersurface in Euclidean space.

This is particularly simple in three dimensions, where every manifold has a spin structure and a result of Louis Nirenberg shows that any positively-curved Riemannian metric on the two-dimensional sphere can be isometrically embedded in three-dimensional Euclidean space in a geometrically unique way. Hence Shi and Tam's result gives a striking sense in which, given a compact and smooth three-dimensional Riemannian manifold-with-boundary of nonnegative scalar curvature, whose boundary components have positive intrinsic curvature and positive mean curvature, the extrinsic geometry of the boundary components are controlled by their intrinsic geometry. More precisely, the extrinsic geometry is controlled by the extrinsic geometry of the isometric embedding uniquely determined by the intrinsic geometry.

Shi and Tam's proof adopts a method, due to Robert Bartnik, of using parabolic partial differential equations to construct noncompact Riemannian manifolds-with-boundary of nonnegative scalar curvature and prescribed boundary behavior. By combining Bartnik's construction with the given compact manifold-with-boundary, one obtains a complete Riemannian manifold which is non-differentiable along a closed and smooth hypersurface. By using Bartnik's method to relate the geometry near infinity to the geometry of the hypersurface, and by proving a positive energy theorem in which certain singularities are allowed, Shi and Tam's result follows.

From the perspective of research literature in general relativity, Shi and Tam's result is notable in proving, in certain contexts, the nonnegativity of the Brown-York quasilocal energy of J. David Brown and James W. York. The ideas of Shi−Tam and Brown−York have been further developed by Mu-Tao Wang and Shing-Tung Yau, among others.

== Major publication ==
- Yuguang Shi and Luen-Fai Tam. Positive mass theorem and the boundary behaviors of compact manifolds with nonnegative scalar curvature. J. Differential Geom. 62 (2002), no. 1, 79–125. doi:10.4310/jdg/1090425530
