= James Stoker =

James Stoker may refer to:

- An alternate name for Anthony Ainley, actor
- James J. Stoker (1905–1992), American applied mathematician and engineer
