= Polini (surname) =

Polini is a surname. Notable people with the surname include:

- Marcella Hazan (née Polini, 1924–2013), Italian cooking writer
- André Polini, Brazilian bicyclist, silver medalist at 2002 Pan American Road and Track Championships
- Battista Polini, founder of motorcycle parts company Polini
- Bella Polini, actress in 1922 German silent film Morass
- Claudia Polini, Italian-American mathematician
- Emélie Polini (1881–1927), English-Australian stage actress
- Marino Polini (born 1959), Italian bicyclist

Polini is also the name of a character in 1944 western film Arizona Whirlwind
