= Basilis Gidas =

Applied mathematician

Basilis Gidas is an applied mathematician at Brown University, interested in many applications of mathematics. Following degrees in electrical engineering, mechanical engineering, and mathematics, he obtained a combined Ph.D. in physics and nuclear engineering at the University of Michigan in 1970. He is an elected fellow of the Institute of Mathematical Statistics. He has had past appointments in various mathematics and physics departments at the Institute for Advanced Study, Rutgers University, Rockefeller University, Bielefeld University, University of Washington, and University of Michigan.

His collaborations with Luis Caffarelli, Wei-Ming Ni, Louis Nirenberg, and Joel Spruck resulted in six papers in pure mathematics, five of which rank among the most cited in the field of elliptic partial differential equations. The collaboration of Gidas, Ni, and Nirenberg in particular was cited in the awarding of the Abel Prize to Nirenberg.

== Selected publications ==
- B. Gidas, Wei Ming Ni, and L. Nirenberg. Symmetry and related properties via the maximum principle. Comm. Math. Phys. 68 (1979), no. 3, 209–243.
- B. Gidas, Wei Ming Ni, and L. Nirenberg. Symmetry of positive solutions of nonlinear elliptic equations in R^{n}. Mathematical analysis and applications, Part A, pp. 369–402, Adv. in Math. Suppl. Stud., 7a, Academic Press, New York-London, 1981.
- B. Gidas and J. Spruck. A priori bounds for positive solutions of nonlinear elliptic equations. Comm. Partial Differential Equations 6 (1981), no. 8, 883–901.
- B. Gidas and J. Spruck. Global and local behavior of positive solutions of nonlinear elliptic equations. Comm. Pure Appl. Math. 34 (1981), no. 4, 525–598.
- Luis A. Caffarelli, Basilis Gidas, and Joel Spruck. Asymptotic symmetry and local behavior of semilinear elliptic equations with critical Sobolev growth. Comm. Pure Appl. Math. 42 (1989), no. 3, 271–297.
