= Martin Schechter =

Martin Schechter may refer to:

- Martin Schechter (epidemiologist)
- Martin Schechter (mathematician)
