= Advances in Applied Mathematics =

- Discipline: Applied Mathematics
- Language: English
- Edited by: Hal Schenck, Catherine Yan

Publication details
- History: 1980–present
- Publisher: Elsevier
- Frequency: 8/year
- Impact factor: 0.848 (2020)

Standard abbreviations
- ISO 4: Adv. Appl. Math.
- MathSciNet: Adv. in Appl. Math.

Indexing
- ISSN: 0196-8858
- LCCN: 80647825
- OCLC no.: 35239151

Links
- Journal homepage; Online access

Advances in Applied Mathematics is a peer-reviewed mathematics journal publishing research on applied mathematics. Its founding editor was Gian-Carlo Rota (Massachusetts Institute of Technology); from 1980 to 1999, Joseph P. S. Kung (University of North Texas) served as managing editor. It is currently published by Elsevier with eight issues per year and edited by Hal Schenck (Auburn University) and Catherine Yan (Texas A&M University).

== Abstracting and indexing ==
The journal is abstracted and indexed by:

- ACM Guide to Computing Literature
- CompuMath Citation Index
- Current Contents/Physics, Chemical, & Earth Sciences
- Mathematical Reviews
- Science Citation Index
- Scopus

According to the Journal Citation Reports, the journal has a 2020 impact factor of 0.848.

== See also ==
- List of periodicals published by Elsevier
