= Hal Schenck =

American mathematician, known for work in algebraic geometry and commutative algebra

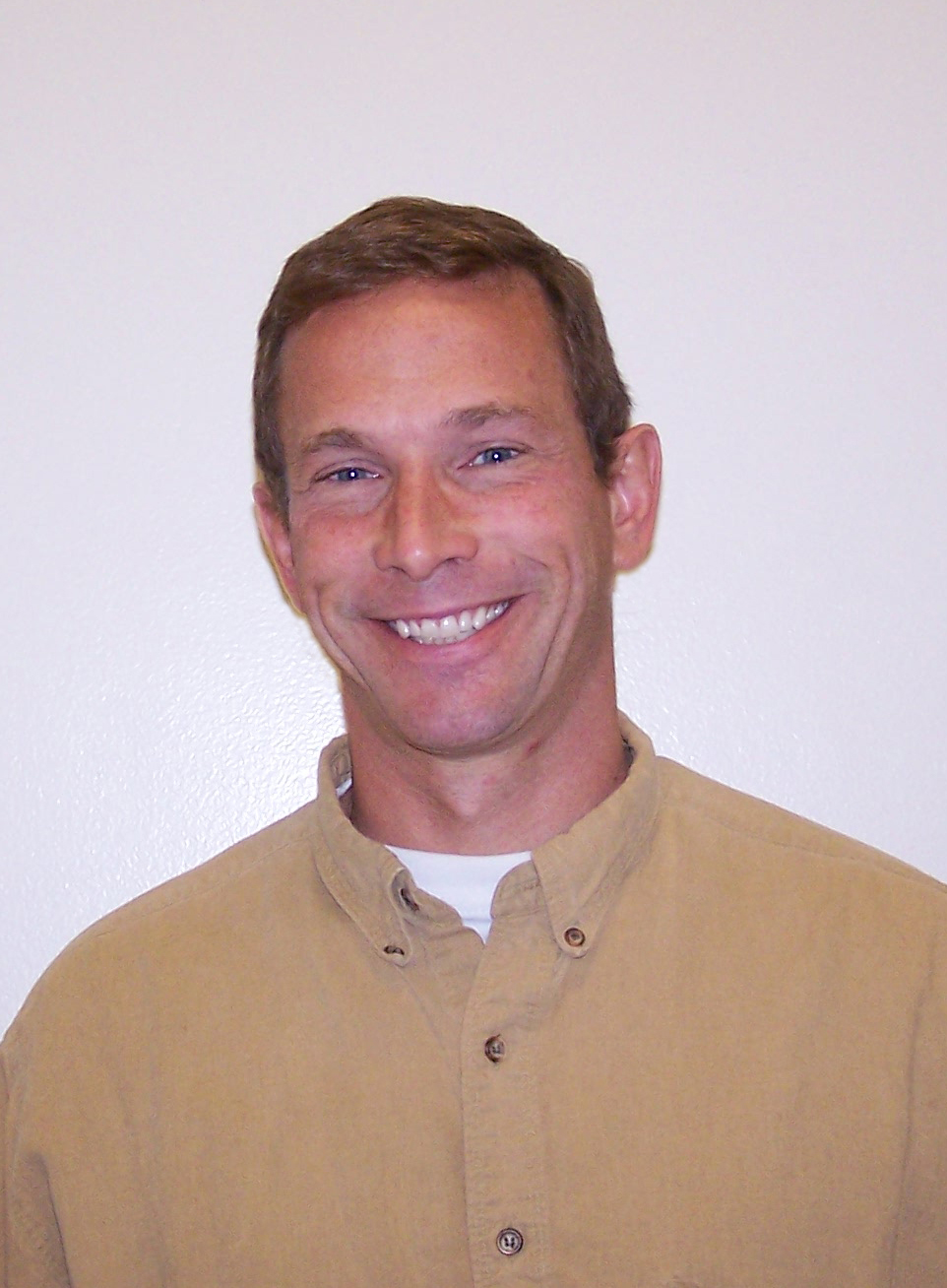
- Education: Carnegie Mellon University (BS); Cornell University (MS, PhD)
- Scientific career
- Fields: Mathematics
- Institutions: Texas A&M University; University of Illinois; Iowa State University; Auburn University
- Thesis: Homological Methods in the Theory of Splines (1997)
- Doctoral advisor: Michael Stillman
- Doctoral students: Alexandra Seceleanu

Henry Koewing "Hal" Schenck is an American mathematician, known for his work in algebraic geometry and commutative algebra. He holds the Rosemary Kopel Brown Eminent Scholars Chair in mathematics at Auburn University.

== Education ==
Schenck attended Carnegie Mellon University for his undergraduate degree. After receiving his BS degree in 1986, he spent 4 years serving in the United States Army, leaving the service as a captain. He then went on to Cornell University for his graduate work. After an MS in 1994, he completed his PhD in mathematics in 1997. His thesis was titled Homological Methods in the Theory of Splines, and was advised by Michael Stillman.

== Career ==
Following completion of his PhD, Schenck held postdoctoral appointments at Northeastern University, then at Harvard University. He moved to Texas A&M University as an assistant professor in 2001, and was promoted to associate professor there. In 2007, he moved to the University of Illinois, where he was promoted to full professor in 2012. In 2017, he moved to Iowa State University, where he served as chair of the Department of Mathematics. He was appointed as the Rosemary Kopel Brown Eminent Scholars Chair in Mathematics at Auburn University in 2019.

Schenck has been (with Catherine Yan) one of the editors-in-chief of Advances in Applied Mathematics since 2018. He was a founding editor (with Jim Coykendall) of the Journal of Commutative Algebra.

== Awards and honors ==
Schenck was elected as a fellow of the American Mathematical Society in 2020 for "contributions to research and exposition in applications of algebraic geometry and for service to the profession."

== Books ==
- Schenck, Hal (2003). Computational Algebraic Geometry. Cambridge University Press. ISBN 978-0-521-53650-9.
- Cox, David A.; Little, John B.; Schenck, Henry K. (2011). Toric Varieties. American Mathematical Society. ISBN 978-0-8218-4819-7.
- Schenck, Hal (2022). Algebraic Foundations for Applied Topology and Data Analysis. Mathematics of Data. Springer. ISBN 978-3-031-06664-1.
