= Luen-Fai Tam =

Mathematician

- Luen-Fai Tam in 2022
- Born: 1947
- Died: 20 November 2025 (aged 77–78)
- Education: Stanford University
- Scientific career
- Fields: Differential geometry General relativity Complex geometry Harmonic maps
- Workplaces: Chinese University of Hong Kong; University of California, Irvine; University of Illinois at Chicago; Purdue University
- Thesis: The Behavior of Capillary Surfaces as Gravity Tends to Zero (1984)
- Doctoral advisor: Robert S. Finn
- Other academic advisors: Peter Li (postdoc mentor)
- Doctoral students: 5

Luen-Fai Tam (Chinese: 譚聯輝, 1947 – 20 November 2025) was a mathematician working in differential geometry, general relativity, and complex geometry. He was a research professor at the Chinese University of Hong Kong.

== Career ==
Tam obtained his PhD in 1984 at Stanford University, advised by Robert S. Finn with a thesis on the behavior of capillary surfaces in low gravity. After completing his doctoral studies, Tam was appointed as a research assistant professor at Purdue University from 1984 to 1986, where his research shifted towards geometric aspects of partial differential equations. In 1986, he joined the University of Illinois at Chicago as a tenure-track assistant professor. From 1987 to 1990, he was a lecturer at the Chinese University of Hong Kong (CUHK). He then moved to the University of California, Irvine as an associate professor in 1990 and was promoted to a full professor there from 1992 to 1997. Tam returned to CUHK in 1997 as a senior lecturer until his retirement in 2007. Following his retirement, Tam was appointed as a research professor at CUHK and advised five doctoral students.

Tam had published 96 mathematical research articles with over 1,300 citations by 546 mathematicians. His research included geometric analysis, harmonic functions, harmonic maps on complete noncompact Riemannian manifolds, mathematical relativity, and complex Kähler manifolds. According to MathSciNet, he had collaborated with 29 mathematicians, including Peter Li at UC Irvine (Tam's postdoctoral mentor while at Purdue) and Yuguang Shi at Peking University.

In honor of Tam's birthday and mathematical contributions, a conference on geometric analysis and mathematical relativity was held at Fujian Normal University in December 2018.
