= Robert Kohn =

Robert Kohn may refer to:

- Robert D. Kohn (1870–1953), American architect
- Robert V. Kohn (1953–2026), American mathematician
