= Albert Baernstein II =

American mathematician

Albert Baernstein II (25 April 1941, Birmingham, Alabama – 10 June 2014, University City, Missouri) was an American mathematician.

== Education and career ==
Baernstein matriculated at the University of Alabama, but after a year there he transferred to Cornell University, where he received his bachelor's degree in 1962. After working for a year for an insurance company, he became a graduate student in mathematics at the University of Wisconsin-Madison, where he received his master's degree in 1964 and Ph.D. in 1968.

Baernstein was from 1968 to 1972 an assistant professor at Syracuse University and from 1972 to 2011 a professor at Washington University in St. Louis, where he retired as professor emeritus.

== Contributions ==
The main focus of Baernstein's was analysis, especially function theory and symmetrization problems. His most important contribution is now called the Baernstein star-function. He originally introduced the star-function to solve an extremal problem posed by Albert Edrei in Nevanlinna theory. Later, the star-function was applied by Baernstein and others to several different extremal problems.

In 1978 he was an Invited Speaker with talk How the *-function solves extremal problems at the ICM in Helsinki. He supervised 15 doctoral students, including Juan J. Manfredi.

== Selected publications ==
- Baernstein, Albert (1969). "A nonlinear Tauberian theorem in function theory". Trans. Amer. Math. Soc. 146: 87–105. doi:10.1090/S0002-9947-1969-0257358-3.
- Baernstein, Albert (1971). "Representations of holomorphic functions by boundary integrals". Trans. Amer. Math. Soc. 160: 27–37. doi:10.1090/S0002-9947-1971-0283182-0.
- Baernstein, Albert (1972). "A representation theorem for functions holomorphic off the real axis". Trans. Amer. Math. Soc. 165: 159–165. doi:10.1090/S0002-9947-1972-0293111-2.
- Baernstein Ii, Albert (1972). "Proof of Edrei's spread conjecture". Bull. Amer. Math. Soc. 78 (2): 277–278. doi:10.1090/S0002-9904-1972-12957-4.
- Baernstein, Albert (1972). "On reflexivity and summability". Studia Mathematica. 42 (1): 91–94. doi:10.4064/sm-42-1-91-94.
- "A generalization of the cos πρ theorem". Trans. Amer. Math. Soc. 193: 181–197. 1974. doi:10.1090/S0002-9947-1974-0344468-7.
- Baernstein, Albert (1974). "Integral means, univalent functions and circular symmetrization". Acta Mathematica. 133 (1): 139–169. doi:10.1007/BF02392144.
- Baernstein, Albert (1976). "Univalence and bounded mean oscillation". The Michigan Mathematical Journal. 23 (3): 217–223. doi:10.1307/mmj/1029001715.
- with Eric T. Sawyer: Embedding and multiplier theorems for H ^{p}(R^{n}). Memoirs of the AMS, vol. 318. American Mathematical Soc. 1985. ISBN 9780821823187.
- Baernstein, Albert (1986). "Coefficients of univalent functions with restricted maximum modulus". Complex Variables and Elliptic Equations. 5 (2–4): 225–236. doi:10.1080/17476938608814143.
- "A unified approach to symmetrization". In: Partial differential equations of elliptic type. Cambridge University Press. 1994. pp. 47–91. ISBN 9780521460484.
- "The ∗-function in complex analysis". In: Handbook of Complex Analysis: Geometric Function Theory. Vol. 1. North-Holland Amsterdam. 2002. pp. 229–271. ISBN 9780080532813.
- with Daniel Girela and José Ángel Peláez: Baernstein, Albert; Girela, Daniel; Peláez, José Ángel (2004). "Univalent functions, Hardy spaces and spaces of Dirichlet type". Illinois Journal of Mathematics. 48 (3): 837–859. doi:10.1215/ijm/1258131055.
