= Robert Finn =

Robert Finn may refer to:

- Robert Emmett Finn (1877–1951), lawyer and political figure in Nova Scotia, Canada
- Robert Finn (mathematician) (1922–2022), American mathematician
- Robert Finn (1930–2011), chief music critic of The Plain Dealer, 1964–1992
- Robert Finn (diplomat) (born 1945), American ambassador to Afghanistan
- Robert Finn (bishop) (born 1953), Roman Catholic prelate, former bishop of Kansas City, Missouri
