= Coykendall =

Coykendall is a surname. Notable people with the surname include

- Jim Coykendall, American mathematician
- Mike Coykendall, American musician

== See also ==
- Coykendall Lodge, former home and current ruin in Hardenburgh, New York
