= Mazzucato =

Mazzucato is a surname. Notable people with the surname include:

- Alberto Mazzucato, Italian musician
- Anna Mazzucato, professor of mathematics
- Carla Carli Mazzucato, Italian artist
- Mariana Mazzucato, Italian economist
- Michele Mazzucato, Italian astronomer
- Nicola Mazzucato, Italian rugby coach
- Roberto Mazzucato, Italian athlete

Mazzucato may also refer to:

- 35461 Mazzucato, main belt asteroid
