= Micheler =

Micheler is a surname. Notable people with the surname include:

- Florian Micheler (born 2005), Austrian footballer
- Joseph Alfred Micheler (1861–1931), French general
- Peter Micheler, West German-Luxembourgish slalom canoeist

== See also ==
- Elisabeth Micheler-Jones (born 1966), West German slalom canoeist
- Michler
