= Julia Gordon (mathematician) =

Canadian mathematician

- Education: University of Michigan (PhD)
- Occupation: Mathematician
- Awards: Ruth I. Michler Memorial Prize (2017); Krieger–Nelson Prize (2019)

Julia Gordon is a Canadian mathematician at the University of British Columbia whose research concerns algebraic geometry, including representation theory, p-adic groups, motivic integration, and the Langlands program.

Gordon earned her PhD at the University of Michigan in 2003 under the supervision of Thomas C. Hales and Robert Griess. Her dissertation was Some Applications of Motivic Integration to the Representation Theory of P-adic Groups. After postdoctoral research at the University of Toronto and the Fields Institute, she joined the University of British Columbia faculty in 2006. As of 2021, she is an associate professor there. In 2026, Gordon is listed as an associate professor.

== Awards ==
In 2017, Gordon won the Ruth I. Michler Memorial Prize of the Association for Women in Mathematics.She served her Michler Fellowship at Cornell University. She is the 2019 winner of the Krieger–Nelson Prize of the Canadian Mathematical Society.
