= YanYan Li =

American mathematician

YanYan Li (also stylized as Yanyan Li, Yan-yan Li, and Yan Yan Li) is a distinguished professor of mathematics at Rutgers University, specializing in elliptic partial differential equations. He received his Ph.D. at New York University in 1988, under the direction of Louis Nirenberg. He joined Rutgers University in 1990.

Li was a Sloan Research Fellow from 1993 to 1995, an invited lecturer at the International Congress of Mathematicians in 2002, and is a Fellow of the American Mathematical Society.

== Major publications ==
- Yan Yan Li and Itai Shafrir. Blow-up analysis for solutions of −Δu = Ve^{u} in dimension two. Indiana Univ. Math. J. 43 (1994), no. 4, 1255–1270. doi:10.1512/iumj.1994.43.43054
- Yan Yan Li. Prescribing scalar curvature on S^{n} and related problems. I. J. Differential Equations 120 (1995), no. 2, 319–410. doi:10.1006/jdeq.1995.1115
- Yan Yan Li. Prescribing scalar curvature on S^{n} and related problems. II. Existence and compactness. Comm. Pure Appl. Math. 49 (1996), no. 6, 541–597. doi:10.1002/(SICI)1097-0312(199606)49:6<541::AID-CPA1>3.0.CO;2-A
