= Patricia Hersh =

American mathematician

Patricia Lynn Hersh
- Born: 1973 (age 52–53)
- Education: Harvard University; Massachusetts Institute of Technology
- Awards: Ruth I. Michler Memorial Prize; Fellow of the American Mathematical Society
- Scientific career
- Fields: Mathematics
- Workplaces: Indiana University Bloomington; North Carolina State University; University of Oregon
- Thesis: Decomposition and Enumeration in Partially Ordered Sets (1999)
- Doctoral advisor: Richard P. Stanley

Patricia Lynn Hersh (born 1973) is an American mathematician who works as a professor of mathematics at the University of Oregon. Her research concerns algebraic combinatorics, topological combinatorics, and the connections between combinatorics and other fields of mathematics.

== Education and career ==
Hersh graduated magna cum laude with an A.B. in mathematics and computer science from Harvard University in 1995, with a senior thesis supervised by Persi Diaconis. She completed her Ph.D. in 1999 at the Massachusetts Institute of Technology, under the supervision of Richard P. Stanley; her dissertation was Decomposition and Enumeration in Partially Ordered Sets.

After postdoctoral positions at the University of Washington, University of Michigan, and Mathematical Sciences Research Institute in Berkeley, California, she joined the faculty at Indiana University Bloomington in 2004, moved to North Carolina State University in 2008, and then to the University of Oregon in 2019. She served as an American Mathematical Society Council member at large from 2011 to 2013.

== Recognition ==
In 2010, Hersh won the Ruth I. Michler Memorial Prize of the Association for Women in Mathematics, funding a visiting position for her at Cornell University. In 2015 she was elected as a fellow of the American Mathematical Society "for contributions to algebraic and topological combinatorics, and for service to the mathematical community".
