= Lia Bronsard =

Canadian mathematician

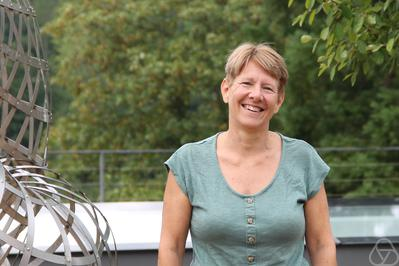
- Bronsard at Oberwolfach in 2022
- Born: March 14, 1963 (age 63)
- Title: Professor

Academic background
- Education: New York University
- Doctoral advisor: Robert V. Kohn

Academic work
- Discipline: Mathematics
- Institutions: McMaster University

Lia Bronsard (b. 14 March 1963) is a Canadian mathematician and the former president of the Canadian Mathematical Society. She is a professor of mathematics at McMaster University.

== Contributions ==
In her research, she has used geometric flows to model the interface dynamics of reaction–diffusion systems. Other topics in her research include pattern formation, grain boundaries, and vortices in superfluids.

== Education and career ==
Bronsard is originally from Québec. She did her undergraduate studies at the Université de Montréal, graduating in 1983, and earned her PhD in 1988 from New York University under the supervision of Robert V. Kohn.

After short-term positions at Brown University, the Institute for Advanced Study, and Carnegie Mellon University, she moved to McMaster in 1992. She was president of the Canadian Mathematical Society for 2014–2016.

== Recognition ==
Bronsard was the 2010 winner of the Krieger–Nelson Prize. In 2018 the Canadian Mathematical Society listed her in their inaugural class of fellows. She was elected to the 2026 class of Fellows of the American Mathematical Society.

== Selected publications ==
- Bronsard, Lia; Kohn, Robert V. (1990), "On the slowness of phase boundary motion in one space dimension", Communications on Pure and Applied Mathematics, 43 (8): 983–997, Bibcode:1990STIN...9121480B, doi:10.1002/cpa.3160430804, MR 1075075
- Bronsard, Lia; Kohn, Robert V. (1991), "Motion by mean curvature as the singular limit of Ginzburg–Landau dynamics", Journal of Differential Equations, 90 (2): 211–237, Bibcode:1991JDE....90..211B, doi:10.1016/0022-0396(91)90147-2, MR 1101239
- Bronsard, Lia; Reitich, Fernando (1993), "On three-phase boundary motion and the singular limit of a vector-valued Ginzburg–Landau equation", Archive for Rational Mechanics and Analysis, 124 (4): 355–379, Bibcode:1993ArRMA.124..355B, doi:10.1007/BF00375607, MR 1240580, S2CID 123291032
