= Anna Skripka =

Ukrainian-American mathematician

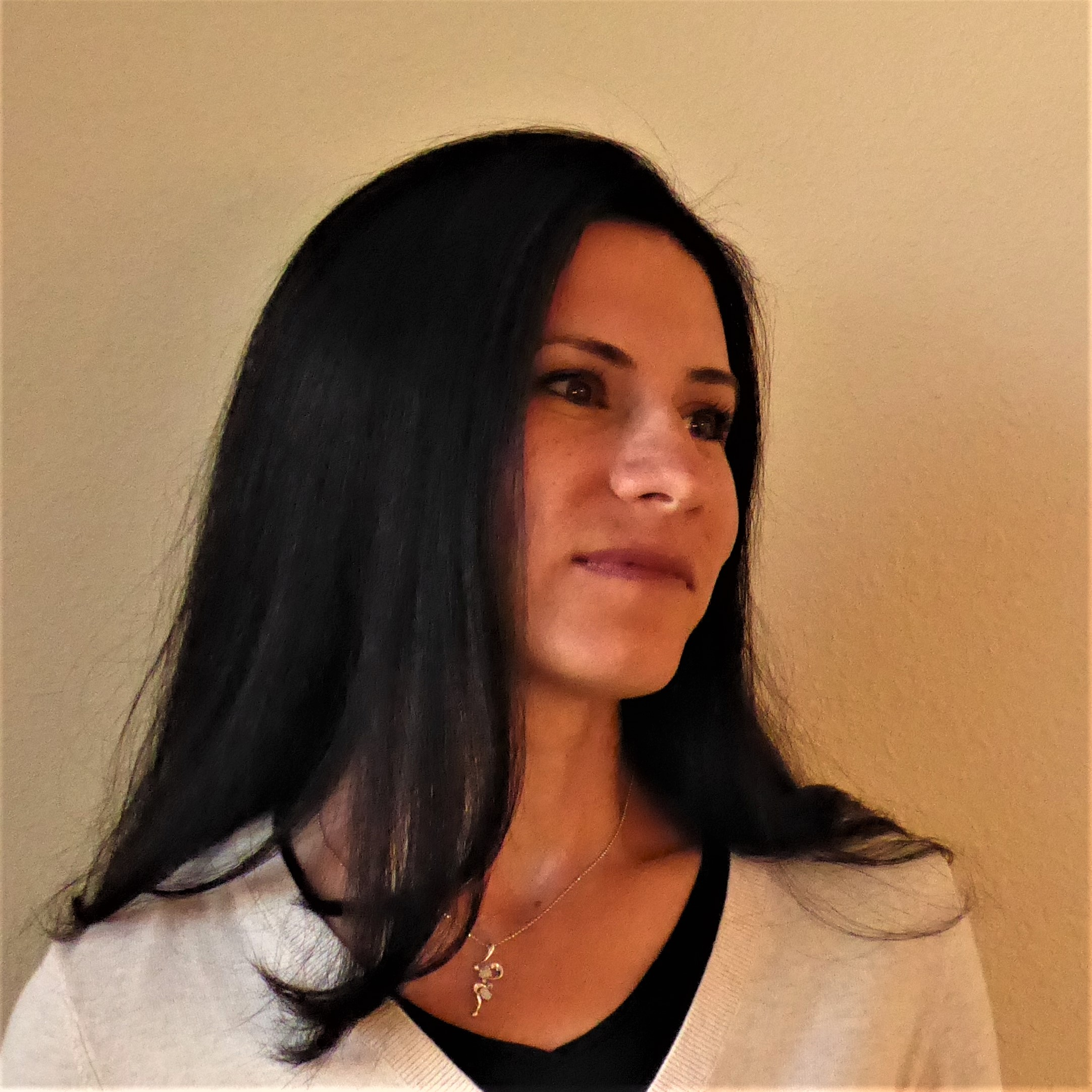

Anna Skripka is a Ukrainian-American mathematician whose research topics include noncommutative analysis and probability. She is a professor at the University of New Mexico.

== Education and career ==
Skripka did her undergraduate studies at the V. N. Karazin Kharkiv National University in Ukraine. She completed her Ph.D. at the University of Missouri. After working as a visiting assistant professor at Texas A&M University and as an assistant professor at the University of Central Florida, she joined the University of New Mexico Department of Mathematics and Statistics in 2012, where she is currently a full professor.

== Recognition ==
Skripka is the 2019 winner of the Ruth I. Michler Memorial Prize of the Association for Women in Mathematics.
