= Claudia Polini =

Italian American mathematician

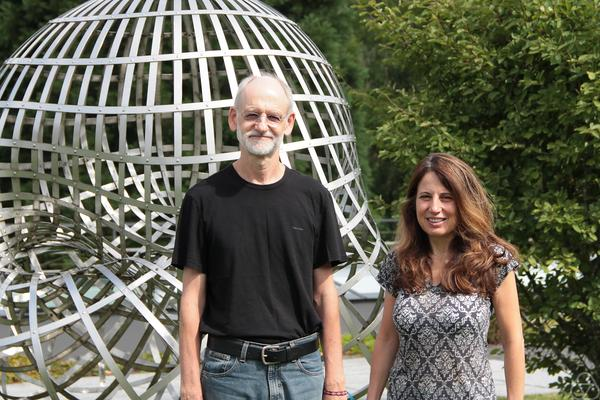
Claudia Polini with Bernd Ulrich at the MFO, 2016

Claudia Polini is an Italian mathematician specializing in commutative algebra. She is the Glynn Family Honors Collegiate Professor of Mathematics at the University of Notre Dame, and directs the Center of Mathematics at Notre Dame.

== Education and career ==
Polini's mother was a school teacher, and before Polini reached school age herself she was already solving the mathematics problems in her mother's lessons. She graduated from the University of Padua in 1990, and completed her Ph.D. at Rutgers University in 1995, with Wolmer Vasconcelos as her doctoral advisor. Her dissertation was Studies on Singularities.

After postdoctoral research at Michigan State University, she became an assistant professor at Hope College in Michigan in 1998, then moved to the University of Oregon in 2000 and to Notre Dame in 2001.

== Contributions ==
Polini is currently an Associate Editor for the Journal of Commutative Algebra, Proceedings of the American Mathematical Society, and Journal of Algebra. She co-authored the research monograph A Study of Singularities on Rational Curves Via Syzygies with David Cox, Andrew R. Kustin, and Bernd Ulrich.

== Recognition ==
At Notre Dame, Polini became the Rev. John Cardinal O'Hara, C.S.C Professor of Mathematics in 2010, and the Glynn Family Honors Professor in 2018.

She was included in the 2019 class of fellows of the American Mathematical Society "for contributions to commutative algebra and for service to the profession".
