= Combinatorics: The Rota Way =

Mathematics textbook on algebraic combinatorics

- First edition
- Author: Joseph P.S. Kung; Gian-Carlo Rota; Catherine H. Yan
- Language: English
- Series: Cambridge Mathematical Library
- Subject: Combinatorics
- Genre: Textbook
- Published: 2009
- Publisher: Cambridge University Press
- Pages: 408

Combinatorics: The Rota Way is a mathematics textbook on algebraic combinatorics, based on the lectures and lecture notes of Gian-Carlo Rota in his courses at the Massachusetts Institute of Technology. It was put into book form by Joseph P. S. Kung and Catherine Yan, two of Rota's students, and published in 2009 by the Cambridge University Press in their Cambridge Mathematical Library book series, listing Kung, Rota, and Yan as its authors (ten years posthumously in the case of Rota). The Basic Library List Committee of the Mathematical Association of America has suggested its inclusion in undergraduate mathematics libraries.

== Topics ==
Combinatorics: The Rota Way has six chapters, densely packed with material: each could be "a basis for a course at the Ph.D. level". Chapter 1, "Sets, functions and relations", also includes material on partially ordered sets, lattice orders, entropy (formulated in terms of partitions of a set), and probability. The topics in Chapter 2, "Matching theory", as well as matchings in graphs, include incidence matrices, submodular set functions, independent matchings in matroids, the Birkhoff–von Neumann theorem on the Birkhoff polytope of doubly stochastic matrices, and the Gale–Ryser theorem on row and column sums of (0,1) matrices. Chapter 3 returns to partially ordered sets and lattices, including material on Möbius functions of incidence algebras, Sperner's theorem on antichains in power sets, special classes of lattices, valuation rings, and Dilworth's theorem on partitions into chains.

One of the things Rota became known for, in the 1970s, was the revival of the umbral calculus as a general technique for the formal manipulation of power series and generating functions, and this is the subject of Chapter 4. Other topics in this chapter include Sheffer sequences of polynomials, and the Riemann zeta function and its combinatorial interpretation. Chapter 5 concerns symmetric functions and Rota–Baxter algebras, including symmetric functions over finite fields. Chapter 6, "Determinants, matrices, and polynomials", concludes the book with material including the roots of polynomials, the Grace–Walsh–Szegő theorem, the spectra of totally positive matrices, and invariant theory formulated in terms of the umbral calculus.

Each chapter concludes with a discussion of the history of the problems it covers, and pointers to the literature on these problems. Also included at the end of the book are solutions to some of the "exercises" provided at the end of each chapter, each of which could be (and often is) the basis of a research publication, and which connect the material from the chapters to some of its applications.

== Audience and reception ==
Combinatorics: The Rota Way is too advanced for undergraduates, but could be used as the basis for one or more graduate-level mathematics courses. However, even as a practicing mathematician in combinatorics, reviewer Jennifer Quinn found the book difficult going, despite the many topics of interest to her that it covered. She writes that she found herself "unsatisfied as a reader", "bogged down in technical details", and missing a unified picture of combinatorics as Rota saw it, even though a unified picture of combinatorics was exactly what Rota often pushed for in his own research. Quinn nevertheless commends the book as "a fine reference" for some beautiful mathematics.

Like Quinn, John Mount complains that parts of the book are unmotivated and lacking in examples and applications, "like a compressed Bourbaki treatment of discrete mathematics". He also writes that some of the exercises, such as one asking for a reproof of the Robertson–Seymour theorem on graph minors (without a guide to its original proof, which extended over a series of approximately 20 papers) are "needlessly cruel". However, he recommends Combinatorics: The Rota Way to students and researchers who have already seen the topics it presents, as a second source "for an alternate and powerful treatment of the topic". Alessandro Di Bucchianico also writes that he is "not entirely positive" about the book, complaining about its "endless rows of definitions, statements, and proofs" without a connecting thread or motivation. He concludes that, although it is a good book for finding a clear description of Rota's favorite pieces of mathematics and their proofs, it is missing the enthusiasm and sense of unity that Rota himself brought to the subject.

On the other hand, Michael Berg reviews the book more positively, calling its writing "crisp and elegant", its exercises deep, "important and fascinating", its historical asides "fun", and the overall book "simply too good to pass up".
