= Robert P. Lipton =

American mathematician

- Education: Courant Institute of Mathematical Sciences
- Known for: Partial Differential Equations; Materials Science
- Awards: AMS Fellow (2020); SIAM Fellow(2020); AAAS Fellow(2013)
- Scientific career
- Fields: Applied mathematics
- Workplaces: Louisiana State University
- Doctoral advisor: Robert V. Kohn

Robert P. Lipton is the Nicholson Professor of Mathematics in the Department of Mathematics at Louisiana State University. He is known for his research on Mathematics of Materials science.

== Academic biography ==
Lipton obtained his PhD in Mathematics at Courant Institute of Mathematical Sciences in 1986, as a student of Robert V. Kohn. He was a Postdoctoral Associate and Visiting Assistant Professor in the Mathematical Sciences Institute at Cornell University and a C. B. Morrey Assistant Professor in the Department of Mathematics at University of California, Berkeley

== Honors ==
He is a fellow of the American Mathematical Society, a fellow of the Society for Industrial and Applied Mathematics, and a fellow of the American Association for the Advancement of Science
