= Louis Nirenberg =

Canadian-American mathematician (1925–2020)

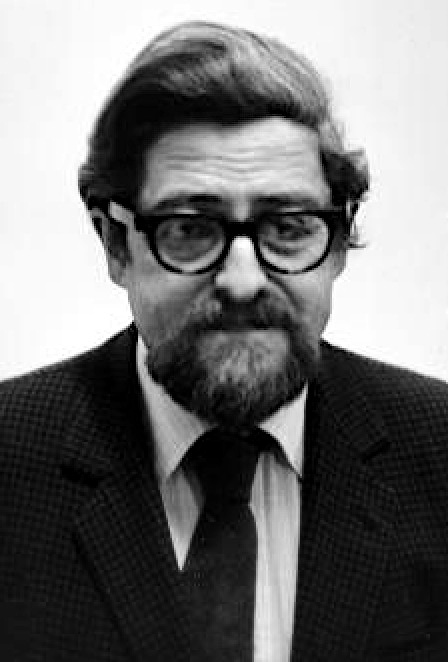
- Nirenberg in 1975
- Born: February 28, 1925; Hamilton, Ontario, Canada
- Died: January 26, 2020 (aged 94); Manhattan, New York, U.S.
- Citizenship: Canadian and American
- Education: McGill University (BS); New York University (MS, PhD)
- Known for: Partial differential equations Gagliardo–Nirenberg interpolation inequality Gagliardo–Nirenberg–Sobolev inequality Bounded mean oscillation (John–Nirenberg space); Nirenberg's conjecture
- Awards: Bôcher Memorial Prize (1959); Crafoord Prize (1982); Steele Prize (1994, 2014); National Medal of Science (1995); Chern Medal (2010); Abel Prize in Mathematics (2015)
- Scientific career
- Fields: Mathematics
- Institutions: New York University
- Thesis: The determination of a closed convex surface having given line elements (1949)
- Doctoral advisor: James Stoker
- Doctoral students: Walter Craig; Peter B. Gilkey; Djairo Guedes de Figueiredo; Sergiu Klainerman; YanYan Li; Chang-Shou Lin; Wei-Ming Ni; Martin Schechter; Gabriella Tarantello

Notes
- Courant Institute of Mathematical Sciences

Louis Nirenberg (February 28, 1925 – January 26, 2020) was a Canadian-American mathematician, considered one of the most outstanding mathematicians of the 20th century.

Nearly all of his work was in the field of partial differential equations. Many of his contributions are now regarded as fundamental to the field, such as his strong maximum principle for second-order parabolic partial differential equations and the Newlander–Nirenberg theorem in complex geometry. He is regarded as a foundational figure in the field of geometric analysis, with many of his works being closely related to the study of complex analysis and differential geometry.

== Biography ==
Nirenberg was born in Hamilton, Ontario to Jewish immigrants from the Russian Empire. He attended Baron Byng High School and McGill University, completing his BS in both mathematics and physics in 1945. Through a summer job at the National Research Council of Canada, he came to know Ernest Courant's wife Sara Paul. She spoke to Courant's father, the eminent mathematician Richard Courant, for advice on where Nirenberg should apply to study theoretical physics. Following their discussion, Nirenberg was invited to enter graduate school at the Courant Institute of Mathematical Sciences at New York University. In 1949, he obtained his doctorate in mathematics, under the direction of James Stoker. In his doctoral work, he solved the "Weyl problem" in differential geometry, which had been a well-known open problem since 1916.

Following his doctorate, he became a professor at the Courant Institute, where he remained for the rest of his career. He was the advisor of 45 PhD students, and published over 150 papers with a number of coauthors, including notable collaborations with Henri Berestycki, Haïm Brezis, Luis Caffarelli, and Yanyan Li, among many others. He continued to carry out mathematical research until the age of 87. On January 26, 2020, Nirenberg died at the age of 94.

Nirenberg's work was widely recognized, including the following awards and honors:

- Bôcher Memorial Prize (1959)
- Elected member of the American Academy of Arts and Sciences (1965)
- Elected member of the United States National Academy of Sciences (1969)
- Crafoord Prize (1982)
- Jeffery–Williams Prize (1987)
- Elected member of the American Philosophical Society (1987)
- Steele Prize for Lifetime Achievement (1994)
- National Medal of Science (1995)
- Chern Medal (2010)
- Steele Prize for Seminal Contribution to Research (2014), with Luis Caffarelli and Robert Kohn, for their article ^{[CKN82]} on the Navier–Stokes equations
- Abel Prize (2015)

== Mathematical achievements ==
Nirenberg is especially known for his collaboration with Shmuel Agmon and Avron Douglis in which they extended the Schauder theory, as previously understood for second-order elliptic partial differential equations, to the general setting of elliptic systems. With Basilis Gidas and Wei-Ming Ni he made innovative uses of the maximum principle to prove symmetry of many solutions of differential equations. The study of the BMO function space was initiated by Nirenberg and Fritz John in 1961; while it was originally introduced by John in the study of elastic materials, it has also been applied to games of chance known as martingales. His 1982 work with Luis Caffarelli and Robert Kohn made a seminal contribution to the Navier–Stokes existence and smoothness, in the field of mathematical fluid mechanics.

Other achievements include the resolution of the Minkowski problem in two-dimensions, the Gagliardo–Nirenberg interpolation inequality, the Newlander-Nirenberg theorem in complex geometry, and the development of pseudo-differential operators with Joseph Kohn.

=== Navier–Stokes equations ===
The Navier–Stokes equations were developed in the early 1800s to model the physics of fluid mechanics. Jean Leray, in a seminal achievement in the 1930s, formulated an influential notion of weak solution for the equations and proved their existence. His work was later put into the setting of a boundary value problem by Eberhard Hopf.

A breakthrough came with work of Vladimir Scheffer in the 1970s. He showed that if a smooth solution of the Navier−Stokes equations approaches a singular time, then the solution can be extended continuously to the singular time away from, roughly speaking, a curve in space. Without making such a conditional assumption on smoothness, he established the existence of Leray−Hopf solutions which are smooth away from a two-dimensional surface in spacetime. Such results are referred to as "partial regularity." Soon afterwards, Luis Caffarelli, Robert Kohn, and Nirenberg localized and sharpened Scheffer's analysis.^{[CKN82]} The key tool of Scheffer's analysis was an energy inequality providing localized integral control of solutions. It is not automatically satisfied by Leray−Hopf solutions, but Scheffer and Caffarelli−Kohn−Nirenberg established existence theorems for solutions satisfying such inequalities. With such "a priori" control as a starting point, Caffarelli−Kohn−Nirenberg were able to prove a purely local result on smoothness away from a curve in spacetime, improving Scheffer's partial regularity.

Similar results were later found by Michael Struwe, and a simplified version of Caffarelli−Kohn−Nirenberg's analysis was later found by Fang-Hua Lin. In 2014, the American Mathematical Society recognized Caffarelli−Kohn−Nirenberg's paper with the Steele Prize for Seminal Contribution to Research, saying that their work was a "landmark" providing a "source of inspiration for a generation of mathematicians." The further analysis of the regularity theory of the Navier−Stokes equations is, as of 2021, a well-known open problem.

=== Nonlinear elliptic partial differential equations ===
In the 1930s, Charles Morrey found the basic regularity theory of quasilinear elliptic partial differential equations for functions on two-dimensional domains. Nirenberg, as part of his Ph.D. thesis, extended Morrey's results to the setting of fully nonlinear elliptic equations.^{[N53a]} The works of Morrey and Nirenberg made extensive use of two-dimensionality, and the understanding of elliptic equations with higher-dimensional domains was an outstanding open problem.

The Monge-Ampère equation, in the form of prescribing the determinant of the Hessian of a function, is one of the standard examples of a fully nonlinear elliptic equation. In an invited lecture at the 1974 International Congress of Mathematicians, Nirenberg announced results obtained with Eugenio Calabi on the boundary-value problem for the Monge−Ampère equation, based upon boundary regularity estimates and a method of continuity. However, they soon realized their proofs to be incomplete. In 1977, Shiu-Yuen Cheng and Shing-Tung Yau resolved the existence and interior regularity for the Monge-Ampère equation, showing in particular that if the determinant of the hessian of a function is smooth, then the function itself must be smooth as well. Their work was based upon the relation via the Legendre transform to the Minkowski problem, which they had previously resolved by differential-geometric estimates. In particular, their work did not make use of boundary regularity, and their results left such questions unresolved.

In collaboration with Luis Caffarelli and Joel Spruck, Nirenberg resolved such questions, directly establishing boundary regularity and using it to build a direct approach to the Monge−Ampère equation based upon the method of continuity.^{[CNS84]} Calabi and Nirenberg had successfully demonstrated uniform control of the first two derivatives; the key for the method of continuity is the more powerful uniform Hölder continuity of the second derivatives. Caffarelli, Nirenberg, and Spruck established a delicate version of this along the boundary, which they were able to establish as sufficient by using Calabi's third-derivative estimates in the interior. With Joseph Kohn, they found analogous results in the setting of the complex Monge−Ampère equation.^{[C+85]} In such general situations, the Evans−Krylov theory is a more flexible tool than the computation-based calculations of Calabi.

Caffarelli, Nirenberg, and Spruck were able to extend their methods to more general classes of fully nonlinear elliptic partial differential equations, in which one studies functions for which certain relations between the hessian's eigenvalues are prescribed.^{[CNS85]} As a particular case of their new class of equations, they were able to partially resolve the boundary-value problem for special Lagrangians.

=== Linear elliptic systems ===
Nirenberg's most renowned work from the 1950s deals with "elliptic regularity." With Avron Douglis, Nirenberg extended the Schauder estimates, as discovered in the 1930s in the context of second-order elliptic equations, to general elliptic systems of arbitrary order.^{[DN55]} In collaboration with Shmuel Agmon and Douglis, Nirenberg proved boundary regularity for elliptic equations of arbitrary order.^{[ADN59]} They later extended their results to elliptic systems of arbitrary order.^{[ADN64]} With Morrey, Nirenberg proved that solutions of elliptic systems with analytic coefficients are themselves analytic, extending to the boundary earlier known work.^{[MN57]} These contributions to elliptic regularity are now considered as part of a "standard package" of information, and are covered in many textbooks. The Douglis−Nirenberg and Agmon−Douglis−Nirenberg estimates, in particular, are among the most widely-used tools in elliptic partial differential equations.

With Yanyan Li, and motivated by composite materials in elasticity theory, Nirenberg studied linear elliptic systems in which the coefficients are Hölder continuous in the interior but possibly discontinuous on the boundary. Their result is that the gradient of the solution is Hölder continuous, with a L^{∞} estimate for the gradient which is independent of the distance from the boundary.^{[LN03]}

=== Maximum principle and its applications ===
In the case of harmonic functions, the maximum principle was known in the 1800s, and was used by Carl Friedrich Gauss. In the early 1900s, complicated extensions to general second-order elliptic partial differential equations were found by Sergei Bernstein, Leon Lichtenstein, and Émile Picard; it was not until the 1920s that the simple modern proof was found by Eberhard Hopf. In one of his earliest works, Nirenberg adapted Hopf's proof to second-order parabolic partial differential equations, thereby establishing the strong maximum principle in that context.^{[N53b]} As in the earlier work, such a result had various uniqueness and comparison theorems as corollaries. Nirenberg's work is now regarded as one of the foundations of the field of parabolic partial differential equations, and is ubiquitous across the standard textbooks.

In the 1950s, A.D. Alexandrov introduced an elegant "moving plane" reflection method, which he used as the context for applying the maximum principle to characterize the standard sphere as the only closed hypersurface of Euclidean space with constant mean curvature. In 1971, James Serrin utilized Alexandrov's technique to prove that highly symmetric solutions of certain second-order elliptic partial differential equations must be supported on symmetric domains. Nirenberg realized that Serrin's work could be reformulated so as to prove that solutions of second-order elliptic partial differential equations inherit symmetries of their domain and of the equation itself. Such results do not hold automatically, and it is nontrivial to identify which special features of a given problem are relevant. For example, there are many harmonic functions on Euclidean space which fail to be rotationally symmetric, despite the rotational symmetry of the Laplacian and of Euclidean space.

Nirenberg's first results on this problem were obtained in collaboration with Basilis Gidas and Wei-Ming Ni. They developed a precise form of Alexandrov and Serrin's technique, applicable even to fully nonlinear elliptic and parabolic equations.^{[GNN79]} In a later work, they developed a version of the Hopf lemma applicable on unbounded domains, thereby improving their work in the case of equations on such domains.^{[GNN81]} Their main applications deal with rotational symmetry. Due to such results, in many cases of geometric or physical interest, it is sufficient to study ordinary differential equations rather than partial differential equations.

Later, with Henri Berestycki, Nirenberg used the Alexandrov−Bakelman−Pucci estimate to improve and modify the methods of Gidas−Ni−Nirenberg, significantly reducing the need to assume regularity of the domain.^{[BN91a]} In an important result with Srinivasa Varadhan, Berestycki and Nirenberg continued the study of domains with no assumed regularity. For linear operators, they related the validity of the maximum principle to positivity of a first eigenvalue and existence of a first eigenfunction.^{[BNV94]} With Luis Caffarelli, Berestycki and Nirenberg applied their results to symmetry of functions on cylindrical domains.^{[BCN96]} They obtained in particular a partial resolution of a well-known conjecture of Ennio De Giorgi on translational symmetry, which was later fully resolved in Ovidiu Savin's Ph.D. thesis.^{[BCN97b]} They further applied their method to obtain qualitative phenomena on general unbounded domains, extending earlier works of Maria Esteban and Pierre-Louis Lions.^{[BCN97a]}

=== Functional inequalities ===
Nirenberg and Emilio Gagliardo independently proved fundamental inequalities for Sobolev spaces, now known as the Gagliardo–Nirenberg–Sobolev inequality and the Gagliardo–Nirenberg interpolation inequalities.^{[N59]} They are used ubiquitously throughout the literature on partial differential equations; as such, it has been of great interest to extend and adapt them to various situations. Nirenberg himself would later clarify the possible exponents which can appear in the interpolation inequality.^{[N66]} With Luis Caffarelli and Robert Kohn, Nirenberg would establish corresponding inequalities for certain weighted norms.^{[CKN84]} Caffarelli, Kohn, and Nirenberg's norms were later investigated more fully in notable work by Florin Catrina and Zhi-Qiang Wang.

Immediately following Fritz John's introduction of the bounded mean oscillation (BMO) function space in the theory of elasticity, he and Nirenberg gave a further study of the space, proving in particular the "John−Nirenberg inequality," which constrains the size of the set on which a BMO function is far from its average value.^{[JN61]} Their work, which is an application of the Calderon−Zygmund decomposition, has become a part of the standard mathematical literature. Expositions are contained in standard textbooks on probability, complex analysis, harmonic analysis, Fourier analysis, and partial differential equations. Among other applications, it is particularly fundamental to Jürgen Moser's Harnack inequality and subsequent work.

The John−Nirenberg inequality and the more general foundations of the BMO theory were worked out by Nirenberg and Haïm Brézis in the context of maps between Riemannian manifolds.^{[BN95]} Among other results, they were able to establish that smooth maps which are close in BMO norm have the same topological degree, and hence that degree can be meaningfully defined for mappings of vanishing mean oscillation (VMO).

=== Calculus of variations ===
In the setting of topological vector spaces, Ky Fan developed a minimax theorem with applications in game theory. With Haïm Brezis and Guido Stampacchia, Nirenberg derived results extending both Fan's theory and Stampacchia's generalization of the Lax-Milgram theorem.^{[BNS72]} Their work has applications to the subject of variational inequalities.

By adapting the Dirichlet energy, it is standard to recognize solutions of certain wave equations as critical points of functionals. With Brezis and Jean-Michel Coron, Nirenberg found a novel functional whose critical points can be directly used to construct solutions of wave equations.^{[BCN80]} They were able to apply the mountain pass theorem to their new functional, thereby establishing the existence of periodic solutions of certain wave equations, extending a result of Paul Rabinowitz. Part of their work involved small extensions of the standard mountain pass theorem and Palais-Smale condition, which have become standard in textbooks. In 1991, Brezis and Nirenberg showed how Ekeland's variational principle could be applied to extend the mountain pass theorem, with the effect that almost-critical points can be found without requiring the Palais−Smale condition.^{[BN91b]}

A fundamental contribution of Brezis and Nirenberg to critical point theory dealt with local minimizers.^{[BN93]} In principle, the choice of function space is highly relevant, and a function could minimize among smooth functions without minimizing among the broader class of Sobolev functions. Making use of an earlier regularity result of Brezis and Tosio Kato, Brezis and Nirenberg ruled out such phenomena for a certain class of Dirichlet-type functionals. Their work was later extended by Jesús García Azorero, Juan Manfredi, and Ireneo Peral.

In one of Nirenberg's most widely cited papers, he and Brézis studied the Dirichlet problem for Yamabe-type equations on Euclidean spaces, following part of Thierry Aubin's work on the Yamabe problem.^{[BN83]} With Berestycki and Italo Capuzzo-Dolcetta, Nirenberg studied superlinear equations of Yamabe type, giving various existence and non-existence results.^{[BCN94]}

=== Nonlinear functional analysis ===
Agmon and Nirenberg made an extensive study of ordinary differential equations in Banach spaces, relating asymptotic representations and the behavior at infinity of solutions to

$$\frac{du}{dt}+Au=0$$

to the spectral properties of the operator A. Applications include the study of rather general parabolic and elliptic-parabolic problems.^{[AN63]}

Brezis and Nirenberg gave a study of the perturbation theory of nonlinear perturbations of noninvertible transformations between Hilbert spaces; applications include existence results for periodic solutions of some semilinear wave equations.^{[BN78a]}^{[BN78b]}

In John Nash's work on the isometric embedding problem, the key step is a small perturbation result, highly reminiscent of an implicit function theorem; his proof used a novel combination of Newton's method (in an infinitesimal form) with smoothing operators. Nirenberg was one of many mathematicians to put Nash's ideas into systematic and abstract frameworks, referred to as Nash-Moser theorems. Nirenberg's formulation is particularly simple, isolating the basic analytic ideas underlying the analysis of most Nash-Moser iteration schemes.^{[N72]} Within a similar framework, he proved an abstract form of the Cauchy–Kowalevski theorem, as a particular case of a theorem on solvability of ordinary differential equations in families of Banach spaces.^{[N72]} His work was later simplified by Takaaki Nishida and used in an analysis of the Boltzmann equation.

=== Geometric problems ===
Making use of his work on fully nonlinear elliptic equations^{[N53a]}, Nirenberg's Ph.D. thesis provided a resolution of the Weyl problem and Minkowski problem in the field of differential geometry.^{[N53c]} The former asks for the existence of isometric embeddings of positively curved Riemannian metrics on the two-dimensional sphere into three-dimensional Euclidean space, while the latter asks for closed surfaces in three-dimensional Euclidean space for which the Gauss map prescribes the Gaussian curvature. The key is that the "Darboux equation" from surface theory is of Monge−Ampère type, so that Nirenberg's regularity theory becomes useful in the method of continuity. John Nash's well-known isometric embedding theorems, established soon afterwards, have no apparent relation to the Weyl problem, which deals simultaneously with high-regularity embeddings and low codimension. Nirenberg's work on the Minkowski problem was extended to Riemannian settings by Aleksei Pogorelov. In higher dimensions, the Minkowski problem was resolved by Shiu-Yuen Cheng and Shing-Tung Yau. Other approaches to the Minkowski problem have developed from Caffarelli, Nirenberg, and Spruck's fundamental contributions to the theory of nonlinear elliptic equations.^{[CNS85]}

In one of his very few articles not centered on analysis, Nirenberg and Philip Hartman characterized the cylinders in Euclidean space as the only complete hypersurfaces which are intrinsically flat.^{[HN59]} This can also be viewed as resolving a question on the isometric embedding of flat manifolds as hypersurfaces. Such questions and natural generalizations were later taken up by Cheng, Yau, and Harold Rosenberg, among others.

Answering a question posed to Nirenberg by Shiing-Shen Chern and André Weil, Nirenberg and his doctoral student August Newlander proved what is now known as the Newlander-Nirenberg theorem, which provides the precise algebraic condition under which an almost complex structure arises from a holomorphic coordinate atlas.^{[NN57]} The Newlander-Nirenberg theorem is now considered as a foundational result in complex geometry, although the result itself is far better known than the proof, which is not usually covered in introductory texts, as it relies on advanced methods in partial differential equations. Nirenberg and Joseph Kohn, following earlier work by Kohn, studied the ∂-Neumann problem on pseudoconvex domains, and demonstrated the relation of the regularity theory to the existence of subelliptic estimates for the ∂ operator.^{[KN65b]}

The classical Poincaré disk model assigns the metric of hyperbolic space to the unit ball. Nirenberg and Charles Loewner studied the more general means of naturally assigning a complete Riemannian metric to bounded open subsets of Euclidean space.^{[LN74]} Geometric calculations show that solutions of certain semilinear Yamabe-type equations can be used to define metrics of constant scalar curvature, and that the metric is complete if the solution diverges to infinity near the boundary. Loewner and Nirenberg established existence of such solutions on certain domains. Similarly, they studied a certain Monge−Ampère equation with the property that, for any negative solution extending continuously to zero at the boundary, one can define a complete Riemannian metric via the hessian. These metrics have the special property of projective invariance, so that projective transformation from one given domain to another becomes an isometry of the corresponding metrics.

=== Pseudo-differential operators ===
Joseph Kohn and Nirenberg introduced the notion of pseudo-differential operators.^{[KN65a]} Nirenberg and François Trèves investigated the famous Lewy's example for a non-solvable linear PDE of second order, and discovered the conditions under which it is solvable, in the context of both partial differential operators and pseudo-differential operators.^{[NT63]}^{[NT70]} Their introduction of local solvability conditions with analytic coefficients has become a focus for researchers such as R. Beals, C. Fefferman, R.D. Moyer, Lars Hörmander, and Nils Dencker who solved the pseudo-differential condition for Lewy's equation. This opened up further doors into the local solvability of linear partial differential equations.

== Major publications ==
Books and surveys.

N73.	Nirenberg, Louis (1973). Lectures on linear partial differential equations. Conference Board of the Mathematical Sciences Regional Conference Series in Mathematics. Vol. 17. Providence, RI: American Mathematical Society. doi:10.1090/cbms/017. ISBN 978-0-8218-1667-7. MR 0450755. Zbl 0267.35001.

N81.	Nirenberg, L. (1981). "Variational and topological methods in nonlinear problems". Bulletin of the American Mathematical Society. New Series. 4 (3): 267–302. doi:10.1090/S0273-0979-1981-14888-6. MR 0609039. Zbl 0468.47040.

N94.	Nirenberg, Louis (1994). "Partial differential equations in the first half of the century". In Pier, Jean-Paul (ed.). Development of Mathematics 1900–1950. Symposium held in Luxembourg, June 1992. Basel: Birkhäuser. pp. 479–515. ISBN 3-7643-2821-5. MR 1298641. Zbl 0807.01017.

N01.	Nirenberg, Louis (2001). Topics in nonlinear functional analysis. Courant Lecture Notes in Mathematics. Vol. 6. Chapter 6 by E. Zehnder. Notes by R. A. Artino (Revised reprint of the 1974 original ed.). New York: New York University, Courant Institute of Mathematical Sciences. doi:10.1090/cln/006. ISBN 0-8218-2819-3. MR 0488102. Zbl 0286.47037.

N18.	Nirenberg, Louis (2018). Lectures on differential equations and differential geometry. Classical Topics in Mathematics. Vol. 7. With a preface by Shiu-Yuen Cheng and Lizhen Ji. Beijing: Higher Education Press. ISBN 978-7-04-050302-9. MR 3889014. Zbl 1465.35001.

Articles.

N53a.	Nirenberg, Louis (1953). "On nonlinear elliptic partial differential equations and Hölder continuity". Communications on Pure and Applied Mathematics. 6 (1): 103–156. doi:10.1002/cpa.3160060105. MR 0064986. Zbl 0050.09801. (Erratum: doi:10.1002/cpa.3160060304)

N53b.	Nirenberg, Louis (1953). "A strong maximum principle for parabolic equations". Communications on Pure and Applied Mathematics. 6 (2): 167–177. doi:10.1002/cpa.3160060202. MR 0055544. Zbl 0050.09601.

N53c.	Nirenberg, Louis (1953). "The Weyl and Minkowski problems in differential geometry in the large". Communications on Pure and Applied Mathematics. 6 (3): 337–394. doi:10.1002/cpa.3160060303. MR 0058265. Zbl 0051.12402.

DN55.	Douglis, Avron; Nirenberg, Louis (1955). "Interior estimates for elliptic systems of partial differential equations". Communications on Pure and Applied Mathematics. 8 (4): 503–538. doi:10.1002/cpa.3160080406. MR 0075417. Zbl 0066.08002.

N55.	Nirenberg, Louis (1955). "Remarks on strongly elliptic partial differential equations". Communications on Pure and Applied Mathematics. 8 (4): 649–675. doi:10.1002/cpa.3160080414. MR 0075415. Zbl 0067.07602.

MN57.	Morrey, C. B. Jr.; Nirenberg, L. (1957). "On the analyticity of the solutions of linear elliptic systems of partial differential equations". Communications on Pure and Applied Mathematics. 10 (2): 271–290. doi:10.1002/cpa.3160100204. MR 0089334. Zbl 0082.09402.

NN57.	Newlander, A.; Nirenberg, L. (1957). "Complex analytic coordinates in almost complex manifolds". Annals of Mathematics. Second Series. 65 (3): 391–404. doi:10.2307/1970051. JSTOR 1970051. MR 0088770. Zbl 0079.16102.

ADN59.	Agmon, S.; Douglis, A.; Nirenberg, L. (1959). "Estimates near the boundary for solutions of elliptic partial differential equations satisfying general boundary conditions. I". Communications on Pure and Applied Mathematics. 12 (4): 623–727. Bibcode:1959CPAM...12..623A. doi:10.1002/cpa.3160120405. MR 0125307. Zbl 0093.10401.

HN59.	Hartman, Philip; Nirenberg, Louis (1959). "On spherical image maps whose Jacobians do not change sign". American Journal of Mathematics. 81 (4): 901–920. doi:10.2307/2372995. JSTOR 2372995. MR 0126812. Zbl 0094.16303.

N59.	Nirenberg, L. (1959). "On elliptic partial differential equations". Annali della Scuola Normale Superiore di Pisa. Classe di Scienze. Serie III. 13 (2): 115–162. MR 0109940. Zbl 0088.07601.

JN61.	John, F.; Nirenberg, L. (1961). "On functions of bounded mean oscillation". Communications on Pure and Applied Mathematics. 14 (3): 415–426. doi:10.1002/cpa.3160140317. MR 0131498. Zbl 0102.04302.

AN63.	Agmon, S.; Nirenberg, L. (1963). "Properties of solutions of ordinary differential equations in Banach space". Communications on Pure and Applied Mathematics. 16 (2): 121–239. doi:10.1002/cpa.3160160204. MR 0155203. Zbl 0117.10001.

NT63.	Nirenberg, L.; Treves, F. (1963). "Solvability of a first order linear partial differential equation". Communications on Pure and Applied Mathematics. 16 (3): 331–351. doi:10.1002/cpa.3160160308. MR 0163045. Zbl 0117.06104.

ADN64.	Agmon, S.; Douglis, A.; Nirenberg, L. (1964). "Estimates near the boundary for solutions of elliptic partial differential equations satisfying general boundary conditions. II". Communications on Pure and Applied Mathematics. 17 (1): 35–92. Bibcode:1964CPAM...17...35A. doi:10.1002/cpa.3160170104. MR 0162050. Zbl 0123.28706.

KN65a.	Kohn, J. J.; Nirenberg, L. (1965). "An algebra of pseudo-differential operators". Communications on Pure and Applied Mathematics. 18 (1–2): 269–305. doi:10.1002/cpa.3160180121. MR 0176362. Zbl 0171.35101.

KN65b.	Kohn, J. J.; Nirenberg, L. (1965). "Non-coercive boundary value problems". Communications on Pure and Applied Mathematics. 18 (3): 443–492. doi:10.1002/cpa.3160180305. MR 0181815. Zbl 0125.33302.

N66.	Nirenberg, L. (1966). "An extended interpolation inequality". Annali della Scuola Normale Superiore di Pisa. Classe di Scienze. Serie III. 20 (4): 733–737. MR 0208360. Zbl 0163.29905.

KN67.	Kohn, J. J.; Nirenberg, L. (1967). "Degenerate elliptic-parabolic equations of second order". Communications on Pure and Applied Mathematics. 20 (4): 797–872. doi:10.1002/cpa.3160200410. MR 0234118. Zbl 0153.14503.

NT70.	Nirenberg, Louis; Trèves, François (1970). "On local solvability of linear partial differential equations. I. Necessary conditions". Communications on Pure and Applied Mathematics. 23 (1): 1–38. doi:10.1002/cpa.3160230102. MR 0264470. Zbl 0191.39103.

BNS72.	Brézis, H.; Nirenberg, L.; Stampacchia, G. (1972). "A remark on Ky Fan's minimax principle". Bollettino della Unione Matematica Italiana. Series IV. 6: 293–300. MR 0324498. Zbl 0264.49013.

N72.	Nirenberg, L. (1972). "An abstract form of the nonlinear Cauchy–Kowalewski theorem". Journal of Differential Geometry. 6 (4): 561–576. Bibcode:1972JDGeo...630643N. doi:10.4310/jdg/1214430643. MR 0322321. Zbl 0257.35001.

NW73.	Nirenberg, Louis; Walker, Homer F. (1973). "The null spaces of elliptic partial differential operators in R^{n}". Journal of Mathematical Analysis and Applications. 42 (2): 271–301. doi:10.1016/0022-247X(73)90138-8. MR 0320821. Zbl 0272.35029.

LN74.	Loewner, Charles; Nirenberg, Louis (1974). "Partial differential equations invariant under conformal or projective transformations". In Ahlfors, Lars V.; Kra, Irwin; Maskit, Bernard; Nirenberg, Louis (eds.). Contributions to Analysis: A Collection of Papers Dedicated to Lipman Bers. New York: Academic Press. pp. 245–272. doi:10.1016/B978-0-12-044850-0.50027-7. MR 0358078. Zbl 0298.35018.

KN77.	Kinderlehrer, D.; Nirenberg, L. (1977). "Regularity in free boundary problems". Annali della Scuola Normale Superiore di Pisa. Classe di Scienze. Serie IV. 4 (2): 373–391. MR 0440187. Zbl 0352.35023.

BN78a.	Brézis, H.; Nirenberg, L. (1978). "Characterizations of the ranges of some nonlinear operators and applications to boundary value problems". Annali della Scuola Normale Superiore di Pisa. Classe di Scienze. Serie IV. 5 (2): 225–326. MR 0513090. Zbl 0386.47035.

BN78b.	Brézis, H.; Nirenberg, L. (1978). "Forced vibrations for a nonlinear wave equation". Communications on Pure and Applied Mathematics. 31 (1): 1–30. doi:10.1002/cpa.3160310102. MR 0470377. Zbl 0378.35040.

GNN79.	Gidas, B.; Ni, Wei Ming; Nirenberg, L. (1979). "Symmetry and related properties via the maximum principle". Communications in Mathematical Physics. 68 (3): 209–243. Bibcode:1979CMaPh..68..209G. doi:10.1007/BF01221125. MR 0544879. S2CID 56251822. Zbl 0425.35020.

BCN80.	Brézis, Haïm; Coron, Jean-Michel; Nirenberg, Louis (1980). "Free vibrations for a nonlinear wave equation and a theorem of P. Rabinowitz". Communications on Pure and Applied Mathematics. 33 (5): 667–684. doi:10.1002/cpa.3160330507. MR 0586417. Zbl 0484.35057.

GNN81.	Gidas, B.; Ni, Wei Ming; Nirenberg, L. (1981). "Symmetry of positive solutions of nonlinear elliptic equations in R^{n}". In Nachbin, Leopoldo (ed.). Mathematical Analysis and Applications. Part A. Essays dedicated to Laurent Schwartz on the occasion of his 65th birthday. Advances in Mathematics, Supplementary Studies. Vol. 7a. New York–London: Academic Press. pp. 369–402. ISBN 0-12-512801-0. MR 0634248. Zbl 0469.35052.

CKN82.	Caffarelli, L.; Kohn, R.; Nirenberg, L. (1982). "Partial regularity of suitable weak solutions of the Navier–Stokes equations". Communications on Pure and Applied Mathematics. 35 (6): 771–831. Bibcode:1982CPAM...35..771C. doi:10.1002/cpa.3160350604. MR 0673830. Zbl 0509.35067.

BN83.	Brézis, Haïm; Nirenberg, Louis (1983). "Positive solutions of nonlinear elliptic equations involving critical Sobolev exponents". Communications on Pure and Applied Mathematics. 36 (4): 437–477. doi:10.1002/cpa.3160360405. MR 0709644. Zbl 0541.35029.

CKN84.	Caffarelli, L.; Kohn, R.; Nirenberg, L. (1984). "First order interpolation inequalities with weights". Compositio Mathematica. 53 (3): 259–275. MR 0768824. Zbl 0563.46024.

CNS84.	Caffarelli, L.; Nirenberg, L.; Spruck, J. (1984). "The Dirichlet problem for nonlinear second-order elliptic equations. I. Monge–Ampère equation". Communications on Pure and Applied Mathematics. 37 (3): 369–402. doi:10.1002/cpa.3160370306. MR 0739925. Zbl 0598.35047. (Erratum: doi:10.1002/cpa.3160400508)

C+85.	Caffarelli, L.; Kohn, J. J.; Nirenberg, L.; Spruck, J. (1985). "The Dirichlet problem for nonlinear second-order elliptic equations. II. Complex Monge–Ampère, and uniformly elliptic, equations". Communications on Pure and Applied Mathematics. 38 (2): 209–252. doi:10.1002/cpa.3160380206. MR 0780073. Zbl 0598.35048.

CNS85.	Caffarelli, L.; Nirenberg, L.; Spruck, J. (1985). "The Dirichlet problem for nonlinear second-order elliptic equations. III. Functions of the eigenvalues of the Hessian". Acta Mathematica. 155 (3–4): 261–301. doi:10.1007/BF02392544. MR 0806416. Zbl 0654.35031.

BN91a.	Berestycki, H.; Nirenberg, L. (1991). "On the method of moving planes and the sliding method". Boletim da Sociedade Brasileira de Matemática. New Series. 22 (1): 1–37. doi:10.1007/BF01244896. MR 1159383. S2CID 119878360. Zbl 0784.35025.

BN91b.	Brezis, Haïm; Nirenberg, Louis (1991). "Remarks on finding critical points". Communications on Pure and Applied Mathematics. 44 (8–9): 939–963. doi:10.1002/cpa.3160440808. MR 1127041. Zbl 0751.58006.

BN92.	Berestycki, Henri; Nirenberg, Louis (1992). "Travelling fronts in cylinders". Annales de l'Institut Henri Poincaré C. 9 (5): 497–572. Bibcode:1992AIHPC...9..497B. doi:10.1016/S0294-1449(16)30229-3. MR 1191008. Zbl 0799.35073.

BN93.	Brezis, Haïm; Nirenberg, Louis (1993). "H1 versus C1 local minimizers". Comptes Rendus de l'Académie des Sciences, Série I. 317 (5): 465–472. MR 1239032. Zbl 0803.35029.

BCN94.	Berestycki, H.; Capuzzo-Dolcetta, I.; Nirenberg, L. (1994). "Superlinear indefinite elliptic problems and nonlinear Liouville theorems". Topological Methods in Nonlinear Analysis. 4 (1): 59–78. doi:10.12775/TMNA.1994.023. MR 1321809. Zbl 0816.35030.

BNV94.	Berestycki, H.; Nirenberg, L.; Varadhan, S. R. S. (1994). "The principal eigenvalue and maximum principle for second-order elliptic operators in general domains". Communications on Pure and Applied Mathematics. 47 (1): 47–92. doi:10.1002/cpa.3160470105. MR 1258192. Zbl 0806.35129.

BCN95.	Berestycki, Henri; Capuzzo-Dolcetta, Italo; Nirenberg, Louis (1995). "Variational methods for indefinite superlinear homogeneous elliptic problems". Nonlinear Differential Equations and Applications. 2 (4): 553–572. doi:10.1007/BF01210623. MR 1356874. S2CID 119668931. Zbl 0840.35035.

BN95.	Brezis, H.; Nirenberg, L. (1995). "Degree theory and BMO. I. Compact manifolds without boundaries". Selecta Mathematica. New Series. 1 (2): 197–263. doi:10.1007/BF01671566. MR 1354598. S2CID 195270732. Zbl 0852.58010.

BCN96.	Berestycki, H.; Caffarelli, L. A.; Nirenberg, L. (1996). "Inequalities for second-order elliptic equations with applications to unbounded domains. I". Duke Mathematical Journal. 81 (2): 467–494. doi:10.1215/S0012-7094-96-08117-X. MR 1395408. Zbl 0860.35004.

BCN97a.	Berestycki, H.; Caffarelli, L. A.; Nirenberg, L. (1997). "Monotonicity for elliptic equations in unbounded Lipschitz domains". Communications on Pure and Applied Mathematics. 50 (11): 1089–1111. doi:10.1002/(SICI)1097-0312(199711)50:11<1089::AID-CPA2>3.0.CO;2-6. MR 1470317. Zbl 0906.35035.

BCN97b.	Berestycki, Henri; Caffarelli, Luis; Nirenberg, Louis (1997). "Further qualitative properties for elliptic equations in unbounded domains". Annali della Scuola Normale Superiore di Pisa. Classe di Scienze. Serie IV. 25 (1–2): 69–94. MR 1655510. Zbl 1079.35513.

LN03.	Li, Yanyan; Nirenberg, Louis (2003). "Estimates for elliptic systems from composite material". Communications on Pure and Applied Mathematics. 56 (7): 892–925. Bibcode:2003CPAM...56..892L. doi:10.1002/cpa.10079. MR 1990481. S2CID 122040650. Zbl 1125.35339.
