= Emily E. Witt =

American mathematician

Emily Elspeth Witt is an American mathematician, an associate professor and Keeler Intra-University Professor of mathematics at the University of Kansas. Her research involves commutative algebra, representation theory, and singularity theory.

== Education and career ==
Witt is a 2005 graduate of the University of Chicago, where she majored in mathematics with a specialization in computer science. She completed her Ph.D. in 2011 at the University of Michigan. Her dissertation, Local cohomology and group actions, was supervised by Melvin Hochster.

Witt worked as a Dunham Jackson Assistant Professor at the University of Minnesota from 2011 to 2014, and as a research assistant professor at the University of Utah from 2014 to 2015. In 20155, she obtained a tenure-track assistant professorship at the University of Kansas. She was promoted to associate professor in 2020, and named Keeler Intra-University Professor for 2021–2022.

== Recognition ==
Witt is the 2022–2023 winner of the Ruth I. Michler Memorial Prize of the Association for Women in Mathematics.
