= Shabnam Akhtari =

Iranian mathematician

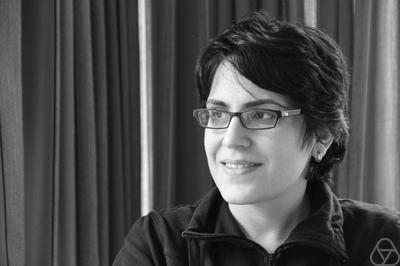
- Akhtari in 2012 at the Oberwolfach Research Institute for Mathematics
- Awards: Ruth I. Michler Memorial Prize; 2021–2022

Academic background
- Education: Sharif University of Technology (B.Sc.); Simon Fraser University (M.Sc.); University of British Columbia (PhD)
- Thesis: Thue Equations and Related Topics (2008)
- Doctoral advisor: Michael Bennett

Academic work
- Discipline: Mathematician
- Sub-discipline: Number theory
- Institutions: University of Oregon; Pennsylvania State University

Shabnam Akhtari is a Canadian-Iranian mathematician specializing in number theory, and in particular in Diophantine equations, Thue equations, and the geometry of numbers. She is a professor of mathematics at Pennsylvania State University.

== Education and career ==
Akhtari graduated from the Sharif University of Technology, in Tehran, in 2002 with a Bachelor of Science degree in mathematics. She earned a Master of Science degree from Simon Fraser University in 2004, before continuing her graduate work in mathematics at the University of British Columbia, completing her Ph.D. there in 2008. Her dissertation, Thue Equations and Related Topics, was supervised by Mike Bennett.

She was a postdoctoral researcher at Queen's University at Kingston in Canada, the Max Planck Institute for Mathematics in Germany and the Centre de Recherches Mathématiques in Canada before joining the University of Oregon faculty as an assistant professor of mathematics in 2012. She was tenured as an associate professor there in 2018.

== Recognition ==
Akhtari is the 2021–2022 winner of the Ruth I. Michler Memorial Prize of the Association for Women in Mathematics.
