= Joel Spruck =

American mathematician (born 1946)

- Education: Stanford University (Ph.D.)
- Scientific career
- Fields: Geometric analysis
- Workplaces: Johns Hopkins University
- Doctoral advisor: Robert S. Finn
- Doctoral students: Ling Xiao

Joel Spruck (born 1946) is a mathematician, J. J. Sylvester Professor of Mathematics at Johns Hopkins University, whose research concerns geometric analysis and elliptic partial differential equations. He obtained his PhD from Stanford University with the supervision of Robert S. Finn in 1971.

== Mathematical contributions ==
Spruck is well known in the field of elliptic partial differential equations for his series of papers "The Dirichlet problem for nonlinear second-order elliptic equations," written in collaboration with Luis Caffarelli, Joseph J. Kohn, and Louis Nirenberg. These papers were among the first to develop a general theory of second-order elliptic differential equations which are fully nonlinear, with a regularity theory that extends to the boundary. Caffarelli, Nirenberg & Spruck (1985) has been particularly influential in the field of geometric analysis since many geometric partial differential equations are amenable to its methods.

With Basilis Gidas, Spruck studied positive solutions of subcritical second-order elliptic partial differential equations of Yamabe type. With Caffarelli, they studied the Yamabe equation on Euclidean space, proving a positive mass-style theorem on the asymptotic behavior of isolated singularities.

In 1974, Spruck and David Hoffman extended a mean curvature-based Sobolev inequality of James H. Michael and Leon Simon to the setting of submanifolds of Riemannian manifolds. This has been useful for the study of many analytic problems in geometric settings, such as for Gerhard Huisken's study of mean curvature flow in Riemannian manifolds and for Richard Schoen and Shing-Tung Yau's study of the Jang equation in their resolution of the positive energy theorem in general relativity.

In the late 80s, Stanley Osher and James Sethian developed the level-set method as a computational tool in numerical analysis. In collaboration with Lawrence Evans, Spruck pioneered the rigorous study of the level-set flow, as adapted to the mean curvature flow. The level-set approach to mean curvature flow is important in the technical ease with topological change that can occur along the flow. The same approach was independently developed by Yun Gang Chen, Yoshikazu Giga, and Shun'ichi Goto. The works of Evans–Spruck and Chen–Giga–Goto found significant application in Gerhard Huisken and Tom Ilmanen's solution of the Riemannian Penrose inequality of general relativity and differential geometry, where they adopted the level-set approach to the inverse mean curvature flow.

In 1994 Spruck was an invited speaker at the International Congress of Mathematicians in Zurich.

== Major publications ==
- Hoffman, David; Spruck, Joel. Sobolev and isoperimetric inequalities for Riemannian submanifolds. Comm. Pure Appl. Math. 27 (1974), 715–727.
- Gidas, B.; Spruck, J. A priori bounds for positive solutions of nonlinear elliptic equations. Comm. Partial Differential Equations 6 (1981), no. 8, 883–901.
- Gidas, B.; Spruck, J. Global and local behavior of positive solutions of nonlinear elliptic equations. Comm. Pure Appl. Math. 34 (1981), no. 4, 525–598.
- Caffarelli, L.; Nirenberg, L.; Spruck, J. The Dirichlet problem for nonlinear second-order elliptic equations. I. Monge-Ampère equation. Comm. Pure Appl. Math. 37 (1984), no. 3, 369–402.
- Caffarelli, L.; Kohn, J.J.; Nirenberg, L.; Spruck, J. The Dirichlet problem for nonlinear second-order elliptic equations. II. Complex Monge-Ampère, and uniformly elliptic, equations. Comm. Pure Appl. Math. 38 (1985), no. 2, 209–252.
- Caffarelli, L.; Nirenberg, L.; Spruck, J. The Dirichlet problem for nonlinear second-order elliptic equations. III. Functions of the eigenvalues of the Hessian. Acta Math. 155 (1985), no. 3–4, 261–301.
- Caffarelli, Luis A.; Gidas, Basilis; Spruck, Joel. Asymptotic symmetry and local behavior of semilinear elliptic equations with critical Sobolev growth. Comm. Pure Appl. Math. 42 (1989), no. 3, 271–297.
- Evans, L.C.; Spruck, J. Motion of level sets by mean curvature. I. J. Differential Geom. 33 (1991), no. 3, 635–681.
- Spruck, Joel; Yang, Yi Song. Topological solutions in the self-dual Chern-Simons theory: existence and approximation. Ann. Inst. H. Poincaré Anal. Non Linéaire 12 (1995), no. 1, 75–97.

== Prizes ==
- Simons Fellowship (2012–2013)
- Fellow of the American Mathematical Society (2013 inauguration)
- Guggenheim Fellowship (1999–2000)
