= Ling Xiao =

Mathematician

Ling Xiao is a mathematician whose research concerns differential geometry, and in particular geometric flow and its associated partial differential equations. She is an associate professor of mathematics at the University of Connecticut.

== Education and career ==
Xiao received her doctorate in mathematics from Johns Hopkins University in 2013, with the dissertation Flow Problems in Hyperbolic Space supervised by Joel Spruck.

After postdoctoral research at the Simons Laufer Mathematical Sciences Institute in Berkeley, California, and postdoctoral short-term positions as a visiting assistant professor at Cornell University and Hill Assistant Professor at Rutgers University, she obtained a tenure-track assistant professorship at the University of Connecticut in 2017. She was given tenure there as an associate professor in 2023.

== Recognition ==
Xiao is the 2025 recipient of the Ruth I. Michler Memorial Prize of the Association for Women in Mathematics, given "for her research accomplishments in geometric analysis and partial differential equations", including "significant contributions to the study of curvature flows in Euclidean space and in Minkowski space, and to the asymptotic Plateau problem for constant-curvature hypersurfaces in hyperbolic space".
