= Gabriella Tarantello =

Italian mathematician (born 1958)

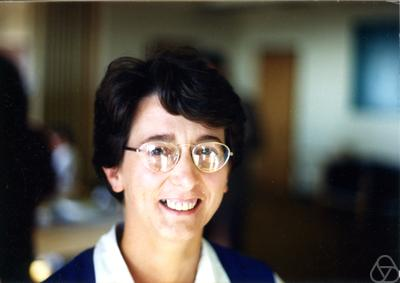
Berkeley, 1987

Gabriella Tarantello (born 15 October 1958) is an Italian mathematician specializing in partial differential equations, differential geometry, and gauge theory. She is a professor in the department of mathematics at the University of Rome Tor Vergata.

== Education and career ==
Tarantello was born in Pratola Peligna. She did her undergraduate studies at the University of L'Aquila, earning a bachelor's degree there in 1982. She then came to New York University for graduate study at the Courant Institute of Mathematical Sciences, earning a master's degree in 1984 and completing her Ph.D. there in 1986. Her dissertation, Some Results on the Minimal Period Problem for Nonlinear Vibrating Strings and Hamiltonian Systems; and on the Number of Solutions for Semilinear Elliptic Equations, was supervised by Louis Nirenberg.

After postdoctoral research at the Institute for Advanced Study and a visiting assistant professorship at the University of California, Berkeley, she joined the Carnegie Mellon University faculty in 1989. She returned to Italy as an associate professor at Tor Vergata in 1993, moved to the University of Basilicata as a full professor in 1994, and returned to Tor Vergata as a full professor in 1995.

== Books ==
Tarantello is the author of the book Selfdual Gauge Field Vortices: An Analytical Approach (Progress in Nonlinear Differential Equations and Their Applications 72, Birkhäuser, 2008). With Matthew J. Gursky, Ermanno Lanconelli, Andrea Malchiodi, and Paul C. Yang, she is a co-author of Geometric Analysis and PDEs: Lectures given at the C.I.M.E. Summer School held in Cetraro, Italy, June 11–16, 2007 (Lecture Notes in Mathematics 1977, Springer, 2009).

== Recognition ==
In 2014, Tarantello won the Lucio & Wanda Amerio Gold Medal Prize of the Istituto Lombardo Accademia di Scienze e Lettere. She became a member of the Academia Europaea in 2020.
