= Maria Westdickenberg =

American applied mathematician

Maria G. Westdickenberg (also published as Maria G. Reznikoff) is an American applied mathematician and mathematical analyst who works in Germany as University Professor in the chair for applied analysis at RWTH Aachen University. She lists her research interests as being in nonlinear partial differential equations and the complex energy landscapes of gradient flow methods for solving these equations.

== Education and career ==
Westdickenberg received a master's degree in applied mathematics in 2000 from the Rensselaer Polytechnic Institute. She continued her studies at the Courant Institute of New York University, completing her Ph.D. in 2004. Her doctoral dissertation, Rare Events in Finite and Infinite Dimensions, was jointly supervised by Robert V. Kohn and Eric Vanden-Eijnden.

After postdoctoral research at the University of Bonn and Princeton University, she became an assistant professor at Georgia Tech in 2006, and was tenured there as an associate professor in 2011. Since 2012 she has been a full professor at RWTH Aachen University.

== Recognition ==
Westdickenberg was a 2010 recipient of the Presidential Early Career Award for Scientists and Engineers, given "for excellent research in applied mathematics, and leadership in recruiting, training, and mentoring students from underrepresented groups".
