= Lauren M. Childs =

American mathematician

Lauren Maressa Childs
- Education: Duke University (BS); Cornell University (MS, PhD)
- Awards: Ruth I. Michler Memorial Prize
- Scientific career
- Fields: Mathematics
- Thesis: Macrophages, Oscillators and Fish: Using Dynamical Systems to Examine Biological Problems (2010)
- Doctoral advisor: Steven Strogatz

Lauren Maressa Childs is an American mathematician specialising in mathematical and computational modelling applied to topics in biology, particularly spread of infectious disease. She is an associate professor of mathematics and Cliff and Agnes Lilly Faculty Fellow at Virginia Tech. She was awarded the 2023-2024 Ruth I. Michler Memorial Prize.

== Education and career ==
Childs obtained a dual bachelor's degree in mathematics and chemistry from Duke University in 2004, and a master's degree in applied mathematics from Cornell University in 2007. She completed a Ph.D. at Cornell University in 2010, under the supervision of Steven Strogatz, with dissertation Macrophages, Oscillators and Fish: Using Dynamical Systems to Examine Biological Problems.

Childs was a postdoctoral researcher at Georgia Institute of Technology from 2010 to 2012, and at Harvard T.H. Chan School of Public Health from 2012 to 2016. In 2016 she worked for 6 months as a visiting assistant professor at Williams College before taking up an assistant professorship at Virginia Tech in August 2016, where in 2022 she became an associate professor.

=== Research ===
Childs' research concerns mathematical models of the spread of infectious disease. This includes numerical analysis and theoretical simulations of systems of differential equations.

== Recognition ==
Childs was awarded the 2023-2024 Ruth I. Michler Memorial Prize of the Association for Women in Mathematics.
