= Sema Salur =

Turkish-American mathematician

Sema Salur is a Turkish-American mathematician, currently serving as a Professor of Mathematics at the University of Rochester. She was awarded the Ruth I. Michler Memorial Prize for 2014–2015, a prize intended to give a recently promoted associate professor a year-long fellowship at Cornell University; and has been the recipient of a National Science Foundation Research Award beginning in 2017. She specialises in the "geometry and topology of the moduli spaces of calibrated submanifolds inside Calabi–Yau, G_{2} and Spin(7) manifolds", which are important to certain aspects of string theory and M-theory in physics, theories that attempt to unite gravity, electromagnetism, and the strong and weak nuclear forces into one coherent Theory of Everything.

== Education ==
- 1993: B.S. in Mathematics, Boğaziçi University, Turkey.
- 2000: PhD in Mathematics, Michigan State University
