= Oscar Bruno =

American mathematician

Oscar P. Bruno
- Education: New York University
- Known for: numerical analysis
- Awards: Sloan Fellowship (1994); Fellow, SIAM (2013)
- Scientific career
- Fields: Applied mathematics Computational mathematics
- Workplaces: Georgia Institute of Technology; California Institute of Technology
- Thesis: The Effective Conductivity of an Infinitely Interchangeable Mixture (1989)
- Doctoral advisor: Robert V. Kohn

Oscar P. Bruno is Professor of Applied & Computational Mathematics in the Computing and Mathematical Sciences Department at the California Institute of Technology. He is known for research on numerical analysis.

== Academic biography ==
Bruno received the Licenciado degree from the University of Buenos Aires in 1982, and he completed the PhD in mathematics at New York University in 1989. His adviser was Robert V. Kohn, and his dissertation was titled The Effective Conductivity of an Infinitely Interchangeable Mixture. He taught at the University of Minnesota from 1989 to 1991, and he was at the Georgia Institute of Technology from 1991 to 1995. He has been on the faculty of the California Institute of Technology since 1995.

== Awards and honors ==
In 1994, Bruno was awarded an Alfred P. Sloan Research Fellowship. He was inducted as a Fellow of the Society for Industrial and Applied Mathematics (SIAM) in 2013.
