= Henri Berestycki =

French mathematician (born 1951)

- Born: 25 March 1951 (age 75); Paris, France
- Education: Lycée Yabné
- Alma mater: École normale supérieure Pierre and Marie Curie University
- Occupation: Mathematician

Henri Berestycki (born 25 March 1951) is a French mathematician who obtained his PhD from Université Paris VI – Pierre and Marie Curie University in 1975. His Dissertation was titled Contributions à l'étude des problèmes elliptiques non linéaires, and his doctoral advisor was Haïm Brezis. He was an L.E. Dickson Instructor in Mathematics at the University of Chicago from 1975–77, after which he returned to France to continue his research. He has made many contributions in nonlinear analysis, ranging from nonlinear elliptic equations, hamiltonian systems, spectral theory of elliptic operators, and with applications to the description of mathematical modelling of fluid mechanics and combustion. His current research interests include the mathematical modelling of financial markets, mathematical models in biology and especially in ecology, and modelling in social sciences (in particular, urban planning and criminology). For these latter topics, he obtained an ERC Advanced grant in 2012.

He worked at the French National Center of Scientific Research (CNRS), then moved to an appointment as Professor at University Paris XIII (1983–1985). He became a Professor of Mathematics in 1988 at Université Pierre et Marie Curie, Paris VI (1988–2001 of “exceptional class” since 1993), and became professor at École normale supérieure, Paris (1994–1999), and part-time professor at the École Polytechnique (1987–1999). He is also a visiting Professor in the Department of Mathematics at the University of Chicago, and was also co-director of the Stevanovich Center of Financial Mathematics in Chicago. He is currently the Directeur d'études (Research Professor) at École des hautes études en sciences sociales (EHESS), since 2001.

== Services ==
- National Committee of French universities (1992 – 1995).
- Since 2002 director of Centre d'analyse et mathématique sociales (CAMS), CNRS – EHESS.
- Vice-president, EHESS (2004 – 2006).
- Member of the thesis prize committee of the Universities of Paris (since 2006).

== Awards ==
- Carrière Prize(1988)
- Prix Sophie Germain of the French Academy of Sciences (2004),
- Humboldt Prize in Germany (2004)
- French Legion of Honor in 2010.
- American Mathematical Society Fellowship (2012).
- Foreign honorary member of the American Academy of Arts and Sciences, 2013.

== Articles ==
- Berestycki, Henri; Coville, Jérôme; Vo, Hoang-Hung Persistence criteria for populations with non-local dispersion. J. Math. Biol. 72 (2016), no. 7, 1693–1745.
- Berestycki, Henri; Coville, Jérôme; Vo, Hoang-Hung On the definition and the properties of the principal eigenvalue of some nonlocal operators. J. Funct. Anal. 271 (2016), no. 10, 2701–2751.
- Berestycki, Henri; Roquejoffre, Jean-Michel; Rossi, Luca; The influence of a line with fast diffusion on Fisher-KPP propagation. J. Math. Biol. 66 (2013), no. 4-5, 743–766.
- Barthélemy, Marc; Nadal, Jean-Pierre; Berestycki, Henri Disentangling collective trends from local dynamics. Proc. Natl. Acad. Sci. USA 107 (2010), no. 17, 7629–7634.
- Berestycki, Henri; Hamel, François; Nadirashvili, Nikolai Elliptic eigenvalue problems with large drift and applications to nonlinear propagation phenomena. Comm. Math. Phys. 253 (2005), no. 2, 451–480.
- Berestycki, Henri; Hamel, François Front propagation in periodic excitable media. Comm. Pure Appl. Math. 55 (2002), no. 8, 949–1032.
- Berestycki, H.; Caffarelli, L. A.; Nirenberg, L. Inequalities for second-order elliptic equations with applications to unbounded domains. I. A celebration of John F. Nash, Jr. Duke Math. J. 81 (1996), no. 2, 467–494.
- Berestycki, H.; Nirenberg, L.; Varadhan, S. R. S. The principal eigenvalue and maximum principle for second-order elliptic operators in general domains. Comm. Pure Appl. Math. 47 (1994), no. 1, 47–92.
- Berestycki, H.; Lions, P.-L. Nonlinear scalar field equations. I. Existence of a ground state. Arch. Rational Mech. Anal. 82 (1983), no. 4, 313–345; II. Existence of infinitely many solutions, Arch. Rational Mech. Anal. 82 (1983), no. 4, 347–375.
- Bahri, Abbas; Berestycki, Henri A perturbation method in critical point theory and applications. Trans. Amer. Math. Soc. 267 (1981), no. 1, 1–32.
