= Eli Turkel =

Israeli applied mathematician

Eli L. Turkel
- אלי טורקל
- Born: January 22, 1944 (age 82); New York City, United States
- Education: Yeshiva University, New York University, Courant Institute at New York University
- Known for: Numerical analysis of Partial Differential Equations, Computational fluid dynamics, Computational electromagnetics, Acoustics, Elasticity, Image processing
- Notable work: Runge-Kutta scheme for Euler equations, Fast algorithms for Navier-Stokes equations, Reading and analysis of first Temple ostraca, Deep learning algorithms for PDEs
- Scientific career
- Fields: Applied mathematics
- Workplaces: Tel Aviv University
- Doctoral advisors: J. J. Stoker, Eugene Isaacson

Eli L. Turkel (Hebrew: אלי טורקל; born January 22, 1944) is an Israeli applied mathematician and currently an emeritus professor of applied mathematics at the School of Mathematical Sciences, Tel Aviv University. He is known for his contributions to numerical analysis of Partial Differential equations particularly in the fields of computational fluid dynamics, computational electromagnetics, acoustics, elasticity and image processing with applications to first Temple ostraca and recently deep learning for forward and inverse problems in PDEs,

== Research ==
His research interests include algorithms solving partial differential equations (PDEs) including scattering and inverse scattering, image processing, and crack propagation. His most quoted paper is with Jameson and Schmidt (JST) on a Runge-Kutta scheme to solve the Euler equations.

Another main contribution includes fast algorithms for the Navier-Stokes equations based on preconditioning techniques, radiation boundary conditions, and high-order accuracy for wave propagation in general-shaped domains using difference potentials.

He has published work on reading ostraca from the First Temple period. Algorithmic handwriting analysis of Judah’s military correspondence sheds light on the composition of biblical texts, which appeared in PNAS and was quoted by numerous sources, including the front page of the NY Times. Later articles deal with ostraca at both Samaria and Arad. Other research includes high-order compact numerical methods for hyperbolic equations, including the Helmholtz equation, acoustics, and Maxwell's equations, using Cartesian grids but general-shaped boundaries and interfaces. Other research uses deep learning to detect sources and obstacles underwater using the acoustic wave equation and data at a few noisy sensors. Recent applications of deep learning include using large time steps and improving the accuracy of finite differences for high frequencies on coarse grids. Other deep learning algorithms include HINTS for iterative methods, VITO for inverse problems, and UNET for time-dependent PDEs. He has also authored articles in Tradition and the Journal of Contemporary Halacha.

Turkel was listed as an ISI highly cited researcher in mathematics. Google Scholar lists over 22,000 citations.

== Education ==
Turkel was born in New York City, United States. He received his B.A. degree from the Yeshiva University in 1965, M.S. degree from the New York University in 1967, and Ph.D. degree from the Courant Institute at New York University in 1970; all in mathematics. His Ph.D. thesis advisors were J. J. Stoker and Eugene Isaacson.

He received rabbinical ordination from Rabbi Joseph B. Soloveitchik.
