= Anna Mazzucato =

American mathematician

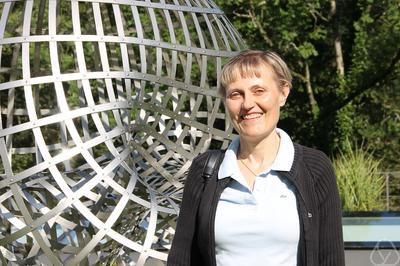
- Mazzucato at Oberwolfach, 2019
- Education: UNC-Chapel Hill
- Awards: Ruth I. Michler Memorial Prize (2011-12)
- Scientific career
- Fields: Functional analysis, PDEs
- Workplaces: Penn State; Yale University; SLMath
- Thesis: Analysis of the Navier-Stokes and Other Nonlinear Evolution Equations with Initial Data in Besov-Type Spaces (2000)
- Doctoral advisor: Michael E. Taylor

Anna Laura Mazzucato is a professor of mathematics, distinguished senior scholar, and associate head of the mathematics department at Pennsylvania State University. Her mathematical research involves functional analysis, function spaces, partial differential equations, and their applications in fluid mechanics and elasticity.

== Education and career ==
Mazzucato earned a master's degree in physics in 1994 from the University of Milan, with a thesis on topological quantum field theory under the supervision of Paolo Cotta-Ramusino. However, during her studies she decided that she preferred the mathematics that she was studying to the physics, and took the advice of Cotta-Ramusino to switch to mathematics for her doctoral studies.

She went to the University of North Carolina at Chapel Hill for doctoral study, initially planning to work in quantum cohomology, but switched to functional analysis with Michael E. Taylor as her doctoral advisor. Her dissertation was Analysis of the Navier-Stokes and Other Nonlinear Evolution Equations with Initial Data in Besov-Type Spaces; it studied the Navier–Stokes equations and other nonlinear partial differential equations.

After postdoctoral research at the Mathematical Sciences Research Institute (supported by a Liftoff Fellowship from the Clay Mathematics Institute) and the Institute for Mathematics and its Applications, and a term as Gibbs Instructor at Yale University, she became an assistant professor at Pennsylvania State University in 2003. She was promoted to full professor there in 2013.

== Recognition ==
Mazzucato was the winner of the Ruth I. Michler Memorial Prize of the Association for Women in Mathematics for 2011–2012, which she used to fund a research visit to Cornell University. At Cornell, she gave the Michler Lecture on "The Analysis of Incompressible Fluids at High Reynolds Numbers". She was named a SIAM Fellow in the 2021 class of fellows, "for discerning analysis of fundamental problems in partial differential equations and mathematical fluid mechanics including boundary layers, transport, and mixing". She was named as a Fellow of the American Mathematical Society, in its 2027 class of fellows.
