= Robert Finn (mathematician) =

American mathematician (1922–2022)

- Born: August 8, 1922; Buffalo, New York, U.S.
- Died: August 16, 2022 (aged 100); Palo Alto, California, U.S.

Academic background
- Education: Rensselaer Polytechnic Institute (BS); Syracuse University (PhD)
- Thesis: On some properties of the solution of a class of non-linear partial differential equations
- Doctoral advisor: Abe Gelbart

Academic work
- Discipline: Mathematics
- Sub-discipline: Minimal surfaces Quasiconformal mapping
- Institutions: University of Southern California; California Institute of Technology; Stanford University
- Doctoral students: Joel Spruck; Luen-Fai Tam

Robert Samuel Finn (August 8, 1922 – August 16, 2022) was an American mathematician who worked in differential geometry, complex analysis and mathematical physics.

== Early life and education ==
Finn was born in Buffalo, New York. He earned a Bachelor of Science degree in physics from Rensselaer Polytechnic Institute and a PhD in mathematics from Syracuse University. Studying under Abe Gelbart, Finn completed a thesis titled On some properties of the solution of a class of non-linear partial differential equations.

== Career ==
He completed post-doctoral research at the Institute for Advanced Study in 1953 and at the Institute for Hydrodynamics of the University of Maryland from 1953 to 1954. In 1954, he became an assistant professor at the University of Southern California and in 1956 an associate professor at California Institute of Technology. Beginning in 1959, he was a professor at Stanford University.

At the beginning of his career, Finn did research on minimal surfaces and quasiconformal mappings and later in his career on mathematical problems of hydrodynamics, such as mathematically rigorous treatments of capillary action. He was a visiting professor at the University of Bonn and several other universities. He was an exchange scientist in 1978 at the Soviet Academy of Sciences and in 1987 at the German Academy of Sciences at Berlin. In 1994 he received an honorary doctorate from the Leipzig University. For the academic years 1958–1959 and 1965–1966, he held Guggenheim Fellowships. From 1979, he was an editor of the Pacific Journal of Mathematics.

== Personal life ==
Finn turned 100 on August 8, 2022. He died eight days later, in Palo Alto, California, on August 16, 2022.

== Selected works ==
- Finn, R. (March 1953). "A Property of Minimal Surfaces". Proceedings of the National Academy of Sciences of the United States of America. 39 (3): 197–201. Bibcode:1953PNAS...39..197F. doi:10.1073/pnas.39.3.197. PMC 1063753. PMID 16589247.
- Finn, R. (October 1954). "On the Flow of a Perfect Fluid through a Polygonal Nozzle. I". Proc Natl Acad Sci U S A. 40 (10): 983–985. Bibcode:1954PNAS...40..983F. doi:10.1073/pnas.40.10.983. PMC 534204. PMID 16589589.
- Finn, R. (October 1954). "On the Flow of a Perfect Fluid through a Polygonal Nozzle. II". Proc Natl Acad Sci U S A. 40 (10): 985–987. Bibcode:1954PNAS...40..985F. doi:10.1073/pnas.40.10.985. PMC 534205. PMID 16589590.
- with Paul Concus: Concus, P.; Finn, R. (June 1969). "On the Behavior of a Capillary Surface in a Wedge". Proc Natl Acad Sci U S A. 63 (2): 292–299. Bibcode:1969PNAS...63..292C. doi:10.1073/pnas.63.2.292. PMC 223563. PMID 16591761.
- Equilibrium capillary surfaces. Grundlehren der mathematischen Wissenschaften. Springer Verlag. 1986.
