= Wei-Ming Ni =

Taiwanese mathematician

- 倪維明
- Born: 倪維明; December 23, 1950 (age 75); Taiwan
- Citizenship: Taiwan
- Scientific career
- Institutions: The Chinese University of Hong Kong, Shenzhen
- Thesis: Some Minimax Principles with Applications in Nonlinear Elliptic Boundary Value Problems and Global Vortex Flow (1979)
- Doctoral advisor: Louis Nirenberg

Wei-Ming Ni (Chinese: 倪維明(倪维明); born 23 December 1950) is a Taiwanese mathematician. He is a Presidential Chair Professor at the Chinese University of Hong Kong, Shenzhen and a professor emeritus at the University of Minnesota. He was previously the director of the Center for PDE at the East China Normal University.

== Education and career ==
Ni works in the field of elliptic and parabolic partial differential equations. He graduated from National Taiwan University with a B.S. in mathematics in 1972 and earned his Ph.D. in mathematics from New York University in 1979 under Louis Nirenberg.

Ni is an editor-in-chief of the Journal of Differential Equations, and was an ISI Highly Cited Researcher in 2002. As said by the journal Discrete and Continuous Dynamical Systems:

[Ni] first became a household name in the PDE community when he published with Gidas and Nirenberg the seminal paper in 1979, “On the symmetry of positive solutions of nonlinear elliptic equations” [...] The research and expository work of Professor Ni has influenced the research directions and activities of a large number of mathematicians, many of whom are playing important roles in the field of partial differential equations today.

== Major publications ==
- Gidas, B.; Ni, Wei Ming; Nirenberg, L. Symmetry and related properties via the maximum principle. Comm. Math. Phys. 68 (1979), no. 3, 209–243.
- Gidas, B.; Ni, Wei Ming; Nirenberg, L. Symmetry of positive solutions of nonlinear elliptic equations in ℝ^{n}. Mathematical analysis and applications, Part A, pp. 369–402, Adv. in Math. Suppl. Stud., 7a, Academic Press, New York-London, 1981.
- Lin, C.-S.; Ni, W.-M.; Takagi, I. Large amplitude stationary solutions to a chemotaxis system. J. Differential Equations 72 (1988), no. 1, 1–27.
- Ni, Wei-Ming; Takagi, Izumi. On the shape of least-energy solutions to a semilinear Neumann problem. Comm. Pure Appl. Math. 44 (1991), no. 7, 819–851.
- Lou, Yuan; Ni, Wei-Ming. Diffusion, self-diffusion and cross-diffusion. J. Differential Equations 131 (1996), no. 1, 79–131.
- Ni, Wei-Ming. Diffusion, cross-diffusion, and their spike-layer steady states. Notices Amer. Math. Soc. 45 (1998), no. 1, 9–18.
