= Phillip Griffith =

American mathematician

Phillip Alan Griffith (born December 29, 1940) is a mathematician and professor emeritus at University of Illinois at Urbana-Champaign who works on commutative algebra and ring theory. He received his PhD from the University of Houston in 1968. Griffith is the editor-in-chief of the Illinois Journal of Mathematics In 1971, Griffith received a Sloan Fellowship.

== Publications ==
- Griffith, Phillip A. (1970), Infinite abelian group theory, The University of Chicago Press, Chicago, Ill.-London, ISBN 978-0-226-30870-8, MR 0289638
- Griffith, Phillip; Evans, E. Graham (1985), Syzygies, London Mathematical Society Lecture Note Series, vol. 106, Cambridge University Press, ISBN 978-0-521-31411-4, MR 0811636
