= James J. Stoker =

American mathematician

- Born: James Johnston Stoker; March 2, 1905; Pittsburgh, Pennsylvania
- Died: October 19, 1992 (aged 87)
- Education: Federal Institute of Technology Zürich, (Ph.D., 1936)
- Known for: Theory of water waves
- Awards: Timoshenko Medal (1970)
- Scientific career
- Fields: Applied Mathematics
- Workplaces: Courant Institute
- Doctoral advisor: Heinz Hopf; George Pólya
- Doctoral students: Louis Nirenberg; Jean Van Heijenoort; Eli Turkel

James Johnston Stoker (March 2, 1905 – October 19, 1992) was an American applied mathematician and engineer. He was director of the Courant Institute of Mathematical Sciences and is considered one of the founders of the institute, Courant and Friedrichs being the others. Stoker is known for his work in differential geometry and theory of water waves. He is also the author of the now classic book Water Waves: The Mathematical Theory with Applications.

== Career ==
Hailing from Pittsburgh, Pennsylvania, Stoker started his career as a mining engineer. In the 1930s, he went to Zürich to pursue a doctorate in mechanics at the Federal Institute of Technology in Zürich. One of the first courses he took there was by Heinz Hopf on geometry. Stoker was so impressed by the subject, and the teacher, that he switched his doctoral programme to differential geometry. He received his Ph.D. degree under the supervision of Hopf and George Pólya. Hopf later recommended Stoker to Richard Courant. In 1937 Stoker, along with Courant's former student Kurt O. Friedrichs, joined Courant in the Department of Mathematics at the New York University. With Stoker's engineering background and Friedrichs' mastery in mathematics, the two effectively collaborated on many applied problems such as plate theory.

On Courant's retirement in 1958 Stoker succeeded him as director and served until 1966. It was during Stoker's period as director, the Institute acquired greater autonomy within the University framework. It became the Courant Institute of Mathematical Sciences in 1965. Friedrichs succeeded Stoker as director in 1966.

== Honors and awards ==
- The American Mathematical Society selected Stoker as the Josiah Willards Gibbs lecturer for 1961.
- In 1970, Stoker received the Timoshenko Medal in recognition of distinguished contributions to the field of applied mechanics.

== Books ==
- Differential Geometry, Wiley-Interscience (1989). ISBN 0-471-50403-3
- Water Waves: The Mathematical Theory with Applications, Wiley-Interscience (1957). 1992 pbk reprint

Stoker's book on "Water Waves" is a significant work which summarises the state of knowledge in water wave theory in 1957. The focus is on linear wave theory.

- Nonlinear Vibrations in Mechanical and Electrical Systems, Wiley-Interscience (1950).
