= Jim Coykendall =

American mathematician

James "Jim" Barker Coykendall IV is an American mathematician.

== Education and Career ==
Coykendall was born in 1966. Coykendall earned his bachelor's degree from the California Institute of Technology in 1989 and completed a doctorate at Cornell University in 1995. His thesis, titled Normsets and Rings of Algebraic Integers, was overseen by Shankar Sen. After earning his doctorate, Coykendall was the C. C. Hsiung Visiting Professor of Mathematics at Lehigh University until 1996. Coykendall's teaching career continued at North Dakota State University, where he was named James A. Meier Professor in 2003. Coykendall joined the faculty of Clemson University in 2013 and served as the Department Chair of the Mathematical Sciences Department from 2013 to 2015.

Coykendall and Hal Schenck have served as editors of the Journal of Commutative Algebra since the publication's first issue in 2009. Coykendall also serves on the editorial boards of the Rocky Mountain Journal of Mathematics and the International Journal of Commutative Rings.

Coykendall has made significant contributions to research in commutative algebra, particularly in the study of factorization properties of rings and ideals. He presented his work on Normsets and Factorization Properties of Rings of Integers at the 1996 Spring Southeastern Sectional Meeting of the American Mathematical Society in Baton Rouge. His research has been widely published, and he has co-authored articles such as Sets with Few Intersection Numbers from Singer Subgroup Orbits, which appeared in the European Journal of Combinatorics.

According to the Mathematics Genealogy Project, Coykendall has supervised 17 doctoral students, as of January 2026.
