= Robert V. Kohn =

American mathematician (1953–2026)

Robert Vita Kohn
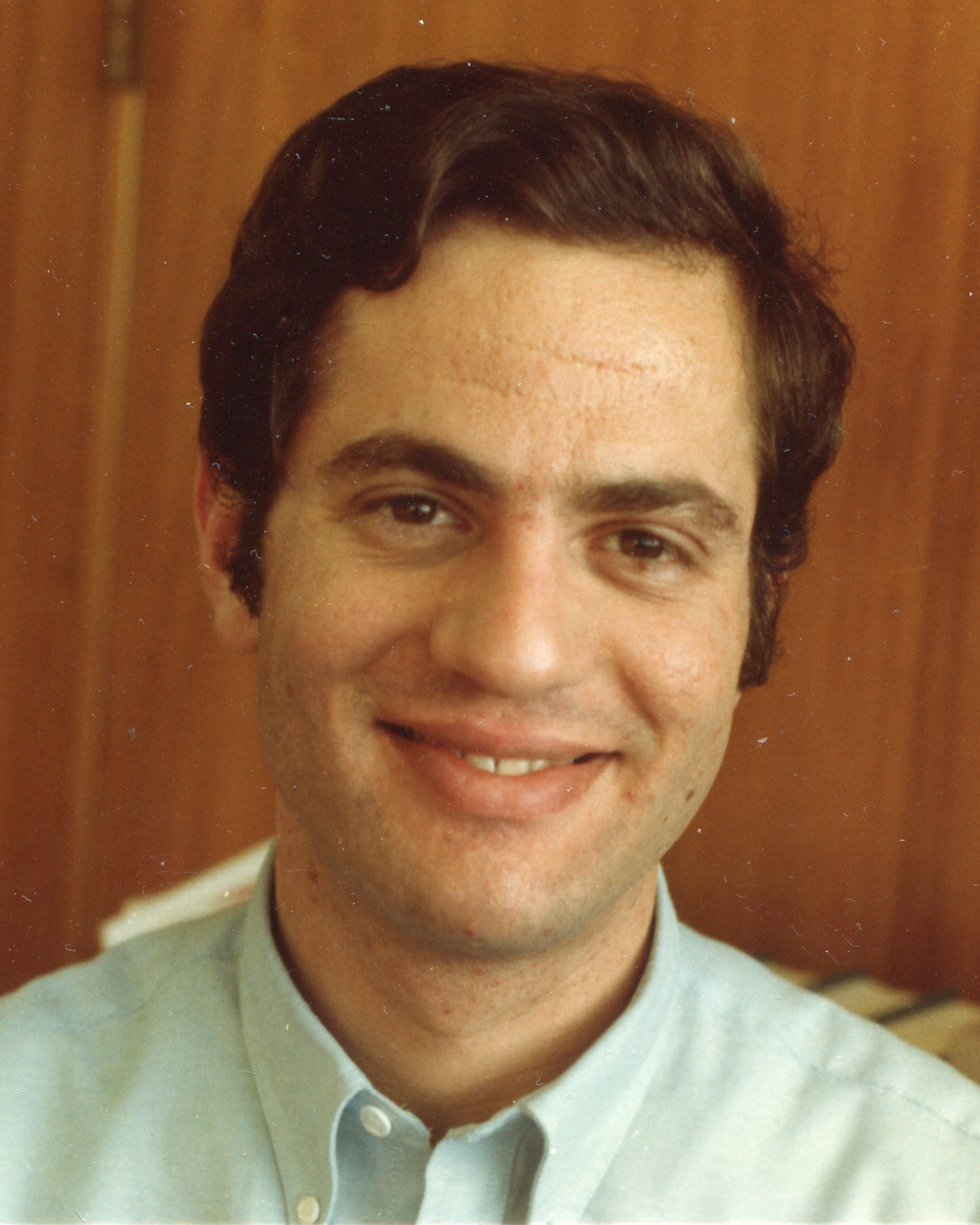
- Kohn in 1984
- Born: October 5, 1953
- Died: January 12, 2026 (aged 72)
- Education: Harvard University; Princeton University
- Known for: Caffarelli–Kohn–Nirenberg inequalities
- Awards: Sloan Research Fellow (1984); ICM Plenary Lecturer (2006); AMS Fellow (2012); Leroy P. Steele Prize (2014)
- Scientific career
- Fields: Mathematics
- Workplaces: Courant Institute of Mathematical Sciences
- Doctoral advisor: Frederick J. Almgren Jr.
- Doctoral students: Lia Bronsard; Oscar Bruno; Robert P. Lipton; Maria Westdickenberg

Robert Vita Kohn (October 5, 1953 – January 12, 2026) was an American mathematician who worked on partial differential equations, calculus of variations, mathematical materials science and mathematical finance. He was a professor at the Courant Institute of Mathematical Sciences, New York University.

== Background ==
Kohn studied mathematics at Harvard University, obtaining his bachelor's degree in 1974. He obtained his Ph.D. at Princeton University in 1979, as a student of Frederick Almgren.

Kohn died of cancer on January 12, 2026, at the age of 72.

== Work ==
Kohn is best known for his work on non-linear partial differential equations, including work with Louis Nirenberg and Luis Caffarelli in which they obtained partial results about the regularity of weak solutions of the Navier–Stokes equations.

== Honors ==
Kohn received a Sloan Research Fellowship in 1984. In 2006, he was a plenary speaker at the International Congress of Mathematicians, in Madrid (Energy driven pattern formation). He was a member of the inaugural class of Fellows of the Society for Industrial and Applied Mathematics (SIAM). He was a fellow of the American Mathematical Society. He was an elected member of American Academy of Arts and Sciences.

== Selected publications ==
- with L. Caffarelli and L. Nirenberg: "Partial regularity of suitable weak solutions of the Navier–Stokes equations", Communications on Pure and Applied Mathematics, n. 35 i. 6, pp. 771–831.
- with L. Caffarelli and L. Nirenberg, "First order interpolation inequalities with weights", Compositio Mathematica n. 53 i. 3, pp. 259–275.
- with Gilbert Strang, "Optimal design and relaxation of variational problems, I", Communications on Pure and Applied Mathematics, n. 39 i. 1, pp. 113–137.
