= Ruth I. Michler =

American mathematician

- Born: March 8, 1967; Ithaca, New York, U.S.
- Died: November 1, 2000 (aged 33); Boston, Massachusetts
- Education: University of Oxford (BA); University of California, Berkeley (MA, PhD)
- Scientific career
- Fields: Commutative algebra, algebraic geometry
- Workplaces: University of North Texas
- Thesis: Hodge components of cyclic homology of affine hypersurfaces (1993)
- Doctoral advisor: Arthur Ogus, Mariusz Wodzicki

Ruth Ingrid Michler (March 8, 1967 to November 1, 2000) was an American-born mathematician of German descent who lived and worked in the United States. She earned her Ph.D. in Mathematics from the University of California, Berkeley, and she was a tenured associate professor at the University of North Texas. She died at the age of 33 while visiting Northeastern University, after which at least three memorial conferences were held in her honor, and the Ruth I. Michler Memorial Prize was established in her memory.

== Early years ==
Michler was the daughter of German mathematician Gerhard O. Michler and was born in Ithaca, New York while her family was visiting Cornell University from Germany. She grew up in Germany, living in Tübingen, Giessen, and Essen. She completed her undergraduate studies in 1988 at the University of Oxford, graduating summa cum laude.

== Doctoral studies and research ==
Michler earned her Ph.D. in mathematics in 1993 from the University of California, Berkeley. Her dissertation is titled "Hodge components of cyclic homology of affine hypersurfaces." Her advisors were Mariusz Wodzicki and Arthur Ogus. She spent the 1993–1994 academic year as a postdoc at Queen's University working with Leslie Roberts. In 1994, she joined the tenure-track faculty at the University of North Texas where she earned tenure in 2000.

== Memorial conferences and prize ==
Michler was killed in an accident in Boston on November 1, 2000, when she was struck by a construction vehicle while on her bicycle. Several conferences were organized in her honor. Two conferences resulted in a volume of papers dedicated to her memory In 2007 the Association for Women in Mathematics inaugurated the Ruth I. Michler Memorial Prize which is "awarded annually to a woman recently promoted to Associate Professor or an equivalent position in the mathematical sciences".
