= Martin Schechter (mathematician) =

American mathematician (1930–2021)

Martin Schechter (March 10, 1930 – June 7, 2021) was an American mathematician whose work concerned mathematical analysis (specially partial differential equations and functional analysis and their applications to mathematical physics). He was a professor at the University of California, Irvine.

Schechter was born in Brooklyn, New York. He did his undergraduate studies at the City University of New York.

He obtained his Ph.D. in 1957 from New York University (NYU) with Louis Nirenberg and Lipman Bers as thesis advisors; his dissertation was entitled On estimating partial differential operator in the L_{2}-norm. He taught at NYU from 1957 to 1966, and at Yeshiva University from 1966 to 1983, before moving to UC Irvine.

He is the author of several books, including the textbook Principles of Functional Analysis (Academic Press, 1971; 2nd ed., AMS, 2002).

Schechter was a member of the Association of Orthodox Jewish Scientists.

Schechter is buried in the Har Menuchot cemetery in the Givat Shaul neighborhood of Jerusalem, Israel.

== Selected publications ==
- Principles of Functional Analysis, Academic Press 1971, 2nd edition, American Mathematical Society 2002
- Minimax systems and critical point theory, Springer 2009
- with Wenming Zou: Critical point theory and its applications, Springer 2006
- Linking methods in critical point theory, Birkhäuser 1999
- Introduction to nonlinear analysis, Cambridge University Press 2004
- Operator methods in quantum mechanics, North Holland 1981, Dover 2002
- Spectra of partial differential operators, North Holland, 1971, 2nd edition 1986
- Modern methods in partial differential equations, McGraw Hill 1977
- with Lipman Bers and Fritz John; with supplements by Lars Gårding, Arthur Milgram: Partial Differential Equations, Wiley 1964, 1966, American Mathematical Society 1991 (chapter by Schechter, Bers Elliptic Equations and Their Solutions, pp. 131–149)
