= Minkowski problem =

Constructing a strictly convex compact surface with specified Gaussian curvature

In differential geometry, the Minkowski problem, named after Hermann Minkowski, asks for the construction of a strictly convex compact surface S whose Gaussian curvature is specified. More precisely, the input to the problem is a strictly positive real function ƒ defined on a sphere, and the surface that is to be constructed should have Gaussian curvature ƒ(n(x)) at the point x, where n(x) denotes the normal to S at x. Eugenio Calabi stated: "From the geometric view point it [the Minkowski problem] is the Rosetta Stone, from which several related problems can be solved."

In full generality, the Minkowski problem asks for necessary and sufficient conditions on a non-negative Borel measure on the unit sphere S^{n-1} to be the surface area measure of a convex body in $\mathbb{R}^n$. Here the surface area measure S_{K} of a convex body K is the pushforward of the (n-1)-dimensional Hausdorff measure restricted to the boundary of K via the Gauss map. The Minkowski problem was solved by Hermann Minkowski, Aleksandr Danilovich Aleksandrov, Werner Fenchel and Børge Jessen: a Borel measure μ on the unit sphere is the surface area measure of a convex body if and only if μ has centroid at the origin and is not concentrated on a great subsphere. The convex body is then uniquely determined by μ up to translations.

The Minkowski problem, despite its clear geometric origin, is found to have its appearance in many places. The problem of radiolocation is easily reduced to the Minkowski problem in Euclidean 3-space: restoration of convex shape over the given Gauss surface curvature. The inverse problem of the short-wave diffraction is reduced to the Minkowski problem. The Minkowski problem is the basis of the mathematical theory of diffraction as well as for the physical theory of diffraction.

In 1953 Louis Nirenberg published the solutions of two long standing open problems, the Weyl problem and the Minkowski problem in Euclidean 3-space. L. Nirenberg's solution of the Minkowski problem was a milestone in global geometry. He has been selected to be the first recipient of the Chern Medal (in 2010) for his role in the formulation of the modern theory of non-linear elliptic partial differential equations, particularly for solving the Weyl problem and the Minkowski problems in Euclidean 3-space.

A. V. Pogorelov received Ukraine State Prize (1973) for resolving the multidimensional Minkowski problem in Euclidean spaces. Pogorelov resolved the Weyl problem in Riemannian space in 1969.

Shing-Tung Yau's joint work with Shiu-Yuen Cheng gives a complete proof of the higher-dimensional Minkowski problem in Euclidean spaces. Shing-Tung Yau received the Fields Medal at the International Congress of Mathematicians in Warsaw in 1982 for his work in global differential geometry and elliptic partial differential equations, particularly for solving such difficult problems as the Calabi conjecture of 1954, and a problem of Hermann Minkowski in Euclidean spaces concerning the Dirichlet problem for the real Monge–Ampère equation.
