= Ruth I. Michler Memorial Prize =

Annual prize in mathematics

The Ruth I. Michler Memorial Prize is an annual prize in mathematics, awarded by the Association for Women in Mathematics to honor outstanding research by a female mathematician who has recently earned tenure. The prize funds the winner to spend a semester as a visiting faculty member at Cornell University, working with the faculty there and presenting a distinguished lecture on their research. It is named after Ruth I. Michler (1967–2000), a German-American mathematician born at Cornell, who died in a road accident at the age of 33.

The award was first offered in 2007. Its winners and their lectures have included:

- Rebecca Goldin (2007), "The Geometry of Polygons"
- Irina Mitrea (2008), "Boundary-Value Problems for Higher-Order Elliptic Operators"
- Maria Gordina (2009), "Lie's Third Theorem in Infinite Dimensions"
- Patricia Hersh (2010), "Regular CS Complexes, Total Positivity and Bruhat Order"
- Anna Mazzucato (2011), "The Analysis of Incompressible Fluids at High Reynolds Numbers"
- Ling Long (2012), "Atkin and Swinnerton-Dyer Congruences"
- Megumi Harada (2013), "Newton-Okounkov bodies and integrable systems"
- Sema Salur (2014), "Manifolds with G2 structure and beyond"
- Malabika Pramanik (2015), "Needles, Bushes, Hairbrushes, and Polynomials"
- Pallavi Dani (2016), "Large-scale geometry of right-angled Coxeter groups"
- Julia Gordon (2017), "Wilkie's theorem and (ineffective) uniform bounds"
- Julie Bergner (2018), "2-Segal structures and the Waldhausen S-construction"
- Anna Skripka (2019), "Untangling noncommutativity with operator integrals"
- Shabnam Akhtari (2021), "Representation of integers by binary forms"
- Emily E. Witt (2022), "Local cohomology: An algebraic tool capturing geometric data"
- Lauren M. Childs (2023), "Modeling infectious disease dynamics: A case study of malaria immunity"
- Alexandra Seceleanu (2024), "Symmetric Ideals"
- Ling Xiao (2025), "The boundary value problem with prescribed singularity"
- Martha E. Precup (2026)

== See also ==
- List of awards honoring women
- List of mathematics awards
