= Journal of Commutative Algebra =

Academic journal of mathematical research

- Discipline: Commutative algebra
- Language: English
- Edited by: Jim Coykendall

Publication details
- History: 2009–present
- Publisher: Rocky Mountain Mathematics Consortium
- Frequency: Quarterly
- Open access: Delayed, after 5 years

Standard abbreviations
- ISO 4: J. Commut. Algebra

Indexing
- ISSN: 1939-2346 (print); 1939-0807 (web)

Links
- Journal homepage; Online access

The Journal of Commutative Algebra is a peer-reviewed academic journal of mathematical research that specializes in commutative algebra and closely related fields. It has been published by the Rocky Mountain Mathematics Consortium (RMMC) since its establishment in 2009. It is currently published four times per year.

Historically, the Journal of Commutative Algebra filled a niche for the Rocky Mountain Mathematics Consortium when the Canadian Applied Mathematics Quarterly, formerly published by the RMMC, was acquired by the Applied Mathematics Institute of the University of Alberta. Founding editors Jim Coykendall (currently at Clemson University) and Hal Schenck (currently at Auburn University) began the journal with the goal of creating a top-tier journal in commutative algebra.

== Abstracting and indexing ==
The journal is abstracted and indexed in Current Contents/Physical, Chemical & Earth Sciences, Science Citation Index Expanded, Scopus, MathSciNet, and zbMATH.
