= Juan J. Manfredi =

Juan J. Manfredi is a Spanish mathematician. From 2010 to 2017, he served as vice provost for undergraduate studies at University of Pittsburgh. Prior to that, he served as an associate dean and professor of mathematics. He received his bachelor's degree from Universidad Complutense de Madrid in 1979 and his PhD from Washington University in St. Louis in 1986. His scholarly work focuses on nonlinear partial differential equations.

In 2017, he was elected a foreign member of the Royal Norwegian Society of Sciences and Letters.

He lives in O'Hara Township, a suburb of Pittsburgh. He has a wife, Vivian, and two children.
