= Catherine Yan =

Mathematician

- 颜华菲

Academic background
- Education: Peking University
- Alma mater: Massachusetts Institute of Technology
- Thesis: The Theory of Commuting Boolean Algebras (1997)

Academic work
- Discipline: Mathematics
- Institutions: Texas A&M University, New York University, Nankai University
- Main interests: Algebraic combinatorics
- Notable works: Combinatorics: The Rota Way

Catherine Huafei Yan (Chinese: 颜华菲) is a professor of mathematics at Texas A&M University interested in algebraic combinatorics.

== Education and career ==
Yan earned a bachelor's degree from Peking University in 1993. She was a student of Gian-Carlo Rota at the Massachusetts Institute of Technology, where she earned her Ph.D. in 1997 with a dissertation on The Theory of Commuting Boolean Algebras.

After working for two years as a Courant Instructor at New York University, she joined Texas A&M in 1999, with a three-year hiatus as Chern Professor at the Center of Combinatorics, Nankai University, from 2005 to 2008.

== Book ==
With her advisor and Joseph Kung, she is an author of Combinatorics: The Rota Way (Cambridge University Press, 2009). The book provides an exposition of the areas of combinatorics of interest to Rota, unified through an algebraic framework, and lists many open research problems in this area.

== Recognition ==
Yan won a Sloan Research Fellowship in 2001. She was elected to the 2018 class of fellows of the American Mathematical Society "for contributions to combinatorics and discrete geometry".
