= Geometric analysis =

Field of higher mathematics

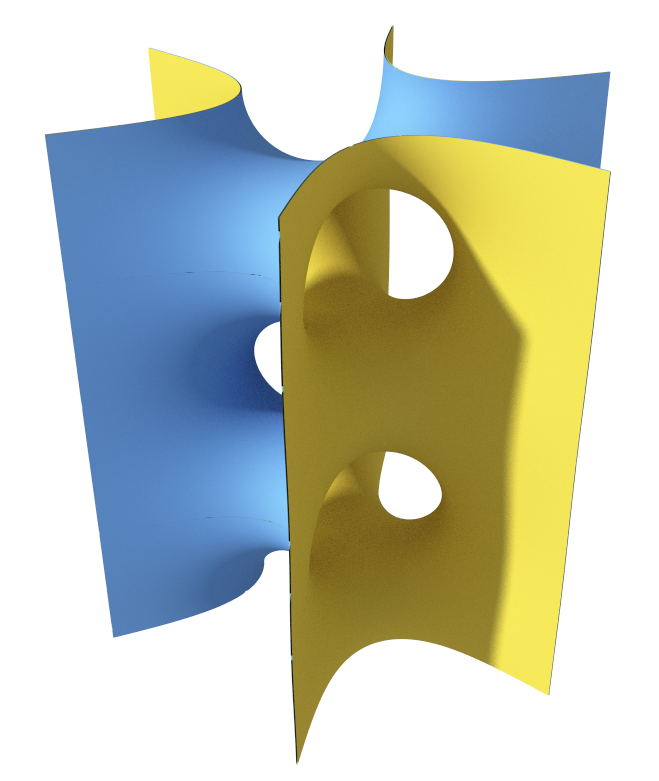
Saddle tower minimal surface. Minimal surfaces are among the objects of study in geometric analysis.

Geometric analysis is a mathematical discipline where tools from differential equations, especially elliptic partial differential equations (PDEs), are used to establish new results in differential geometry and differential topology. The use of linear elliptic PDEs dates at least as far back as Hodge theory. More recently, it refers largely to the use of nonlinear partial differential equations to study geometric and topological properties of spaces, such as submanifolds of Euclidean space, Riemannian manifolds, and symplectic manifolds. This approach dates back to the work by Tibor Radó and Jesse Douglas on minimal surfaces, John Forbes Nash Jr. on isometric embeddings of Riemannian manifolds into Euclidean space, work by Louis Nirenberg on the Minkowski problem and the Weyl problem, and work by Aleksandr Danilovich Aleksandrov and Aleksei Pogorelov on convex hypersurfaces. In the 1980s fundamental contributions by Karen Uhlenbeck, Clifford Taubes, Shing-Tung Yau, Richard Schoen, and Richard Hamilton launched a particularly exciting and productive era of geometric analysis that continues to this day. A celebrated achievement was the solution to the Poincaré conjecture by Grigori Perelman, completing a program initiated and largely carried out by Richard Hamilton.

== Scope ==
The scope of geometric analysis includes both the use of geometrical methods in the study of partial differential equations (when it is also known as "geometric PDE"), and the application of the theory of partial differential equations to geometry. It incorporates problems involving curves and surfaces, or domains with curved boundaries, but also the study of Riemannian manifolds in arbitrary dimension. The calculus of variations is sometimes regarded as part of geometric analysis, because differential equations arising from variational principles have a strong geometric content. Geometric analysis also includes global analysis, which concerns the study of differential equations on manifolds, and the relationship between differential equations and topology.

The following is a partial list of major topics within geometric analysis:

- Gauge theory
- Harmonic maps
- Kähler–Einstein metrics
- Mean curvature flow
- Minimal submanifolds
- Positive energy theorems
- Pseudoholomorphic curves
- Ricci flow
- Yamabe problem
- Yang–Mills equations
