= Charles B. Morrey Jr. =

American mathematician (1927-1984)

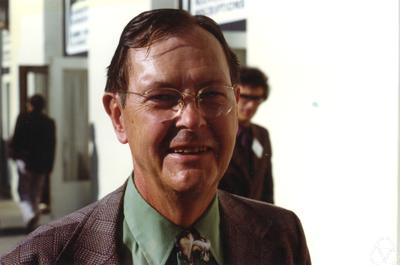
- Charles B. Morrey Jr. in 1974
- Born: 23 July 1907; Columbus, Ohio
- Died: 29 April 1984 (aged 76)
- Education: PhD Harvard University; B.A. and M.A. Ohio State University
- Known for: Morrey's inequality; Morrey-Campanato spaces
- Awards: National Academy of Sciences membership (1962), American Academy of Arts and Sciences fellowship (1965), Berkeley Citation (1973),
- Scientific career
- Fields: Mathematics
- Workplaces: Rice Institute; Chicago University; UC Berkeley
- Patrons: Griffith Conrad Evans
- Doctoral advisor: George Birkhoff

Charles Bradfield Morrey Jr. (July 23, 1907 – April 29, 1984) was an American mathematician who made fundamental contributions to the calculus of variations and the theory of partial differential equations.

== Life ==
Charles Bradfield Morrey Jr. was born July 23, 1907, in Columbus, Ohio; his father was a professor of bacteriology at Ohio State University, and his mother was president of a school of music in Columbus. His sister Marion Morrey Richter was a composer and pianist. Therefore it can be said that his one was a family of academicians. Perhaps from his mother's influence, he had a lifelong love for piano, even if mathematics was his main interest since his childhood. He was at first educated in the public schools of Columbus and, before going to the university, he spent a year at Staunton Military Academy in Staunton, Virginia.

In 1933, during his stay at the Department of Mathematics of the University of California, Berkeley as an instructor, he met Frances Eleonor Moss, who had just started studying for her M.A.: they married in 1937 and had three children. With summers off the family enjoyed traveling: they crossed the United States by car at least 20 times, visiting many natural wonders, and looked forward to the AMS meetings, held each year in August. They usually spent abroad their sabbatical leaves, and doing so they visited nearly every European country, witnessing many changes succeeding during the period from the 1950s to the 1980s.

=== Academic career ===
Morrey graduated from Ohio State University with a B.A. in 1927 and a M.A. in 1928, and then studied at Harvard University under the supervision of George Birkhoff, obtaining a Ph.D. in 1931 with a thesis entitled Invariant functions of Conservative Surface Transformations. After being awarded his Ph.D, he was a National Research Council Fellow at Princeton, at the Rice Institute and finally at the University of Chicago. He became a professor of mathematics at UC Berkeley in 1933, hired by Griffith Conrad Evans, and was a faculty member until his retirement in 1973. In Berkeley, he was early given several administrative duties, for example being the Chairman of the Department of Mathematics during the period 1949–1954, and being the Acting Chairman, the Vice Chairman and the Director of the Institute of Pure and Applied Mathematics at various times. During the years 1937–1938 and 1954–1955 he was a member of the Institute for Advanced Study: he was also Visiting Assistant Professor at Northwestern University, Visiting Professor at the University of Chicago and Miller Research Professor at Berkeley. During World War II he was employed as a mathematician at the U.S. Ballistic Research Laboratory in Maryland.

=== Honors ===
In 1962 he was elected member of the National Academy of Sciences: on May 12, 1965, he was elected fellow member of the American Academy of Arts and Sciences. From 1967 to 1968 he was president of the American Mathematical Society. On the fifth of June 1973 he was awarded the prestigious Berkeley Citation. Maull (1995a, p. 10) refers also that other honors were granted him, but she does not gives any further detail.

=== Tracts of his personality ===
Kelley, Lehmer & Robinson (1989, p. 107) describe him as really very gifted for friendship, having a charming sense of humor and being continuously attentive for people, mathematics and musics. His human qualities are described as the complement to his ability in administrative duties and in scientific research: as a confirmation of his skills in scientific research, also Maull (1995a, p. 10) states that he was one of the strongest workers in analysis.

=== The Charles B. Morrey Jr. Assistant Professorship ===
In 1985 his widow, Frances Eleonor Morrey, née Ross, established the Charles B. Morrey Jr. Assistant Professorship at the Berkeley Mathematics department, to honor his memory.

== Work ==
=== Research activity ===
Con l'opera di Morrey il metodo diretto del Calcolo delle Variazioni riprendeva il suo cammino ed i problemi esistenziali rimasti aperti trovavano soluzione.

— Gaetano Fichera, (Fichera 1995, p. 21).

Morrey worked on numerous fundamental problems in analysis, among them, the existence of quasiconformal maps, the measurable Riemann mapping theorem, Plateau's problem in the setting of Riemannian manifolds, and the characterization of lower semicontinuous variational problems in terms of quasiconvexity. He greatly contributed to the solution of Hilbert's nineteenth and twentieth problems.

=== Teaching activity ===
Charles B. Morrey Jr. was a very effective teacher. His book (Morrey 1962) was the forerunner of a sequence of texts on calculus and analytic geometry, written in collaboration with Murray H. Protter. According to Kelley, Lehmer & Robinson (1989, p. 106) and to Maull (1995a, p. 10), these books have had a wide influence on both university and high school teaching of mathematics. Morrey was also a successful advanced level teacher and thesis supervisor: at least 17 Ph.D. dissertations were written under his supervision.

== Selected publications ==
- Morrey, Charles B. Jr. (1928), Some properties of the derivatives of functions, Columbus, Ohio: The Ohio State University, p. 32. The library file of C. B. Morrey Jr.'s master thesis (M. A. Thesis) at the university library of Ohio State University.
- Morrey, Charles B. Jr. (1931), Invariant functions of conservative surface transformations., Cambridge, MA: Harvard University. The library file of C. B. Morrey Jr.'s doctoral thesis, at the library of Harvard University.
- Morrey, Charles B. Jr. (July 1935), "An Analytic Characterization of Surfaces of Finite Lebesgue Area. Part I", American Journal of Mathematics, 57 (3): 692–702, doi:10.2307/2371197, JFM 61.0733.03, JSTOR 2371197, MR 1507104, Zbl 0012.20404.
- Morrey, Charles B. Jr. (April 1936), "An Analytic Characterization of Surfaces of Finite Lebesgue Area. Part II", American Journal of Mathematics, 58 (2): 313–322, doi:10.2307/2371041, JFM 62.0807.03, JSTOR 2371041, MR 1507155, Zbl 0014.10801
- Morrey, Charles B. Jr. (1938), "On the solutions of quasi-linear elliptic partial differential equations", Transactions of the American Mathematical Society, 43 (1): 126–166, doi:10.2307/1989904, JFM 62.0565.02, JSTOR 1989904, MR 1501936, Zbl 0018.40501.
- Morrey, Charles B. Jr. (1940), "Functions of several variables and absolute continuity, II", Duke Mathematical Journal, 6 (1): 187–215, doi:10.1215/S0012-7094-40-00615-9, JFM 66.1225.01, MR 0001279, Zbl 0026.39401.
- Morrey, Charles B. Jr. (1943), "Multiple integral problems in the calculus of variations and related topics", University of California Publications in Mathematics, (New Series), 1: 1–130, MR 0011537, Zbl 0063.04107.
- Morrey, Charles B. Jr. (July 1958), "The Analytic Embedding of Abstract Real-Analytic Manifolds", The Annals of Mathematics, Second Series, 68 (1): 159–201, doi:10.2307/1970048, JSTOR 1970048, MR 0099060, Zbl 0090.38401.
- Morrey, Charles B. Jr. (1960), "Multiple integral problems in the calculus of variations and related topics", Annali della Scuola Normale Superiore di Pisa – Classe di Scienze, Serie III, 14 (1): 1–61, MR 0115117, Zbl 0094.08104. Available at NUMDAM.
- Morrey, Charles B. Jr. (1962), University Calculus with Analytic Geometry, Reading, Massachusetts: Addison–Wesley, p. 754, reviewed by Hoffman, Stephen (May 1963), "University Calculus with Analytic Geometry. by C. B. Morrey Jr.", The American Mathematical Monthly, 70 (5): 590–592, doi:10.2307/2312108, JSTOR 2312108.
- Morrey, Charles B. (1966), Multiple integrals in the calculus of variations, Die Grundlehren der mathematischen Wissenschaften, vol. 130, Berlin–Heidelberg–New York: Springer-Verlag, pp. xii+506, ISBN 978-3-540-69915-6, MR 0202511, Zbl 0142.38701.
- Morrey, Charles B. Jr. (1968), "Partial Regularity Results for Non-Linear Elliptic Systems", Journal of Mathematics and Mechanics, 17 (7): 649–670, doi:10.1512/iumj.1968.17.17041, MR 0237947, Zbl 0175.11901.
- Morrey, Charles B. Jr. (1983), "Griffith Conrad Evans", in National Academy of Sciences of the United States of America (ed.), Biographical Memoirs, vol. 54, Washington, D.C.: National Academy Press, pp. 126–155, doi:10.17226/577, ISBN 978-0-309-03391-6.

== See also ==
- Direct method in the calculus of variations
- Calculus of variations
- Plateau's problem
