= Well-posed problem =

Property of differential equations describing physical phenomena

In mathematics, the solution to a well-posed problem satisfies the following properties:

1. It exists;
2. It is unique;
3. Its behavior changes continuously with the auxiliary conditions, such as initial or boundary values.

These criteria were first introduced by Jacques Hadamard in 1902.

Examples of archetypal well-posed problems include the Dirichlet problem for Laplace's equation and the heat equation with specified initial conditions. These might be regarded as "natural" problems in that there are physical processes modeled by these problems.

Problems that are not well-posed in the sense above are termed ill-posed. A simple example is a global optimization problem, because the location of the optima is generally not a continuous function of the parameters specifying the objective, even when the objective itself is a smooth function of those parameters. Inverse problems are often ill-posed; for example, the inverse heat equation, deducing a previous distribution of temperature from final data, is not well-posed in that the solution is highly sensitive to changes in the final data.

Continuum models must often be discretized in order to obtain a numerical solution. While solutions may be continuous with respect to the initial conditions, they may suffer from numerical instability when solved with finite precision, or with errors in the data.

== Conditioning ==
Even if a problem is well-posed, it may still be ill-conditioned, meaning that a small error in the initial data can result in much larger errors in the answers. Problems in nonlinear complex systems (so-called chaotic systems) provide well-known examples of instability. An ill-conditioned problem is indicated by a large condition number.

If the problem is well-posed, then it stands a good chance of solution on a computer using a stable algorithm. If it is not well-posed, it needs to be re-formulated for numerical treatment. Typically this involves including additional assumptions, such as smoothness of solution. This process is known as regularization. Tikhonov regularization is one of the most commonly used for regularization of linear ill-posed problems.

== Existence of local solutions ==
The existence of local solutions is often an important part of the well-posedness problem, and it is the foundation of many estimate methods, for example, the energy method below.

There are many results on this topic. For example, the Cauchy–Kowalevski theorem for Cauchy initial value problems essentially states that if the terms in a partial differential equation are all made up of analytic functions and a certain transversality condition is satisfied (the hyperplane, or more generally hypersurface, where the initial data are posed must be non-characteristic with respect to the partial differential operator), then on certain regions, there necessarily exist solutions which are as well analytic functions. This is a fundamental result in the study of analytic partial differential equations. Surprisingly, the theorem does not hold in the setting of smooth functions; an example discovered by Hans Lewy in 1957 consists of a linear partial differential equation with smooth but not analytic coefficients for which no solution exists. So the Cauchy–Kowalevski theorem is necessarily limited in its scope to analytic functions.

== Energy method ==
The energy method is useful for establishing both uniqueness and continuity with respect to initial conditions (i.e. it does not establish existence). The method is based upon deriving an upper bound of an energy-like functional for a given problem.

Example: Consider the diffusion equation on the unit interval with homogeneous Dirichlet boundary conditions and suitable initial data $f(x)$ (e.g. for which $f(0) = f(1) = 0$):
$$\begin{align}
u_t &= D u_{xx}, && 0< x < 1,\, t > 0,\, D > 0,\\
u(x, 0) &= f(x), \\
u(0, t) &= 0, \\
u(1, t) &= 0.
\end{align}$$

Multiply the equation $u_t = D u_{xx}$ by $u$ and integrate in space over the unit interval to obtain
$$\begin{align}
&& \int_0^1 uu_t dx &= D\int_0^1 uu_{xx}dx \\
\Longrightarrow && \int_0^1 \frac{1}{2} \partial_t u^2 dx &= Duu_x\Big|_0^1 - D \int_0^1(u_x)^2\,dx \\
\Longrightarrow && \frac{1}{2} \partial_t\|u\|_2^2 &= 0 - D \int_0^1(u_x)^2\,dx \leq 0.
\end{align}$$
This tells us that $\|u\|_2$ (p-norm) cannot grow in time. By multiplying by two and integrating in time, from $0$ up to $t$, one finds
$$\|u(\cdot, t)\|_2^2 \leq \|f(\cdot)\|_2^2.$$
This result is the energy estimate for this problem.

To show uniqueness of solutions, assume that there are two distinct solutions to the problem, call them $u$ and $v$, each satisfying the same initial data. Upon defining $w = u - v$ then, via the linearity of the equations, one finds that $w$ satisfies
$$\begin{align}
w_t &= D w_{xx}, && 0 < x < 1,\, t > 0,\, D > 0,\\
w(x, 0) &= 0, \\
w(0, t) &= 0, \\
w(1, t) &= 0.
\end{align}$$
Applying the energy estimate tells us $\|w(\cdot, t)\|_2^2 \leq 0,$ which implies $u = v$ (almost everywhere).

Similarly, to show continuity with respect to initial conditions, assume that $u$ and $v$ are solutions corresponding to different initial data $u(x, 0) = f(x)$ and $v(x, 0) = g(x)$. Considering $w = u - v$ once more, one finds that $w$ satisfies the same equations as above but with $w(x, 0) = f(x) - g(x)$. This leads to the energy estimate $\|w(\cdot, t)\|_2^2 \leq D\|f(\cdot) - g(\cdot)\|_2^2$ which establishes continuity (i.e. as $f$ and $g$ become closer, as measured by the $L^2$ norm of their difference, then $\|w(\cdot, t)\|_2 \to 0$).

The maximum principle is an alternative approach to establish uniqueness and continuity of solutions with respect to initial conditions for this example. The existence of solutions to this problem can be established using Fourier series.

== Semi-group theory ==
If it is possible to denote the solution to a Cauchy problem $\frac{\partial u}{\partial t}=Au, u(0)=u_0 \text{ (1)}$, where A is a linear operator mapping a dense linear subspace D(A) of X into X (see discontinuous linear map), with $u(t)=S(t)u_0$, where $\{S(t);t\geq 0\}$ is a family of linear operators on X, satisfying

- $S(0)=I$
- $S(a+b)=S(a)S(b)=S(b)S(a)$ for any $a,b\geq0$
- $t\mapsto S(t)w$ is continuous for every $w$ in $X$
- $\frac{d}{dt}S(t)w=AS(t)w$ for every $w$ in $X$

then (1) is well-posed.

Hille–Yosida theorem states the criteria on A for such a $\{S(t);t\geq 0\}$ to exist.
