= Griffith C. Evans =

American mathematician (1887–1973)

Griffith Conrad Evans
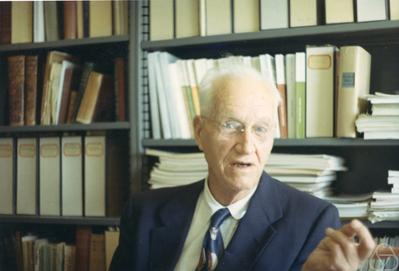
- Born: 11 May 1887
- Died: 8 December 1973 (aged 86)
- Education: Harvard University
- Scientific career
- Fields: Potential theory Functional analysis Integral equations
- Workplaces: Rice University; University of California, Berkeley
- Doctoral advisor: Maxime Bôcher
- Doctoral students: John Gergen; Alfred Horn; Kenneth May; Charles F. Roos

Griffith Conrad Evans (11 May 1887 – 8 December 1973) was a mathematician working for much of his career at the University of California, Berkeley. He is largely credited with elevating Berkeley's mathematics department to a top-tier research department, having recruited many notable mathematicians in the 1930s and 1940s.

== Biography ==
Evans earned his PhD at Harvard in 1910 under Maxime Bôcher with a dissertation on Volterra's Integral Equation, after which he did a post-doc for two years at the University of Rome on a Sheldon Fellowship from Harvard. The experience of working under Vito Volterra shaped his intellectual life and solidified his interest in the application of mathematics to a broad range of fields. Evans became close to Volterra during his time at Rome, being invited on many occasions to lunch with the Volterra family; he would remain in contact with Virginia Volterra, Vito Volterra's niece, until the 1960s.

Evans was appointed assistant professor at Rice University in 1912, with a recommendation letter from Volterra, and promoted to professor in 1916. He married Isabel Mary John in 1917 and they would eventually have 3 children. During his time at Rice, he managed to attract significant mathematicians as visiting professors, such as Szolem Mandelbrojt, Tibor Rado, and Karl Menger. His early research dealt with functional analysis, potential theory, integral equations, and mathematical economics.

In 1934, he moved to University of California, Berkeley to chair the mathematics department. Here, Evans was tasked with improving the department, including the initiation of a graduate program. Much of his success was due to his ability to recruit many notable research mathematicians, including Hans Lewy, Jerzy Neyman, and Alfred Tarski. His own research work was in potential theory and mathematics applied to economics. He chaired Berkeley's department until 1949 and retired in 1955, eventually becoming the namesake of Evans Hall at Berkeley.

== Mathematical economics ==
Evans first work in mathematical economics, entitled A Simple Theory of Competition a restatement of Augustine Cournot's monopoly/duopoly model. Evans expanded Cournot's work significantly by exploring the analytical implications of a variety of different assumptions as to the behavior and objectives of either the monopolist or the duopolists. His following work, The Dynamics of Monopoly, published in 1924, was one of the first to apply the calculus of variations to economic theory. He frames the same monopolist problem now in an intertemporal framework, that is, instead of seeking immediate profit-maximization, the monopolist aims to make his profits as maximum through an interval of time. His work was followed by his Ph.D. advisee Charles Roos who generalized his monopoly model to a case with multiple competing firms. Roos also managed to express this model within a general equilibrium framework. Roos would also be one of the three founders of the Econometric Society alongside Norwegian economist Ragnar Frisch and American economist Irving Fisher. Evans participated in the foundation of the Society and became one of its first fellows.

The first economist to take notice of Evans' work was Harold Hotelling. He met personally with Evans at a meeting of the American Mathematical Society and was immediately impressed by the scope of his work which he deemed to be a "dawning economic theory" that would bear "to the older theories the relations which the Hamiltonian dynamics and the thermodynamics of entropy bear to their predecessors". At this time, economics was not seen as a mathematical science, and many economists were even doubtful if mathematics could be useful for social sciences in general. As a result, Evans and Roos found only a small audience properly equipped to understand their works. Even so, the more mathematically inclined economists and mathematicians E. B. Wilson, Irving Fisher, Henry Schultz, and Paul Samuelson all recognized the importance of their theory.

Evans main contribution to mathematical economics came in the form of his 1930 textbook Mathematical Introduction to Economics, published by Mc Graw Hill. The book's reception, however, failed to meet Evans' expectations. British economist Arthur L. Bowley, in particular, was very critical stating that the book would be of no use either to the mathematician nor to the economist. R. G. D. Allen, a colleague of Bowley, also criticized the book for not presenting a general economic theory and focusing too much on the resolution of particular problems. Some positive reviews came from Roos and Hotelling, the latter going as far as saying that the book helped "lay a groundwork upon which future contributions to political economy of first-rate importance may be expected to be based".

Despite the mixed reception of his textbook, Evans continued interested in mathematical economics throughout his lifetime. In 1934 he contributed Maximum Production Studied in a Simplified Economic System to the recently established journal Econometrica, published on behalf of the Econometric Society. This work would later be extended by some of his students at Berkeley. He also maintained contact with the field attending seminars and presenting papers at meetings organized by the Econometric Society and the Cowles Commission for Economic Research.

During his time at Berkeley Evans arranged a weekly seminar on mathematical economics at his home. He also supervised many Ph.D. theses in the field that followed similar lines of his work. One of his most notable students was economist Ronald Shephard, famous for his derivation of Shephard's lemma. Shephard's 1953 Cost and Production Functions expands Evans' theoretical work on costs functions. He also restates Evans' classical dynamic monopoly problem, better incorporating expectations and price changes. Other notable students include Francis W. Dresch, Kenneth May, and Edward A. Davis.

Some authors, such as Roy Weintraub, argue that Evans' impact in mathematical economics was severely limited by his refusal to adopt utility in his economic models. The subjective theory of value stated the individuals aimed to make their pleasure or utility a maximum. Evans argued that the mathematical conditions to assure the existence of an index function such as utility were stiff and artificial. Moreover, he stated that ''[t]here is no such measurable quantity as 'value' or 'utility' (with all due respect to Jevons, Walras and others) and there is no evaluation of 'the greatest happiness for the greatest number'; or, more flatly,– there is no such thing''. His 1930 book featured two chapters where he criticized utility from the standpoint of the integrability conditions necessary to guarantee that a demand function be the result of the maximization of some utility function. Despite being criticized by many other authors, utility remained a central concept for economics. Additionally, from the 1940s through the 1960s, Keynesianism dominated the macrodynamics discussion. Samuelson's Foundations of Economic Analysis formalized dynamics as the study of the limiting properties of systems of differential equations. In this sense, the analysis was now confined to the stability and convergence of these systems around a steady state. How the system responded to shocks was deemed more relevant than understanding any particular point of equilibrium.

General interest in the calculus of variations an intertemporal optimization rekindled with the rise the neoclassical growth literature (e.g. Ramsey–Cass–Koopmans model) that ostensibly employed optimal control and Hamiltonians. Standard textbooks in economics now commonly present some stylized version of Evans' monopoly problem.

== Notable positions ==
- Chair, University of California, Berkeley Mathematics Department (1934–1949)
- President, American Mathematical Society (1939–1940)
- Member, National Academy of Sciences (1933)
- Member, American Academy of Arts and Sciences (1934)
- Member, American Philosophical Society (1941)

== Selected publications ==
- Evans, G. C. (1924). "The Dynamics of Monopoly". The American Mathematical Monthly. 31 (2): 77–83. doi:10.2307/2300113. JSTOR 2300113.
- The logarithmic potential, discontinuous Dirichlet and Neumann problems. American Mathematical Society. 1927.
- Mathematical introduction to economics. McGraw Hill. 1930.
- Evans, Griffith C. (1932). "The Role of Hypothesis in Economic Theory". Science. 75 (1943): 321–324. Bibcode:1932Sci....75..321E. doi:10.1126/science.75.1943.321. JSTOR 1657995. PMID 17797670.
- Stabilité et dynamique de la production dans l'économie politique. Gauthier-Villars. 1932.
- Evans, Griffith C. (1934). "Maximum Production Studied in a Simplified Economic System". Econometrica. 2 (1): 37–50. doi:10.2307/1907949. JSTOR 1907949.
- Evans, Griffith C. (1935). "On potentials of positive mass. I". Trans. Amer. Math. Soc. 37 (2): 226–253. doi:10.1090/s0002-9947-1935-1501785-8. MR 1501785.
- Evans, Griffith C. (1935). "On potentials of positive mass. II". Trans. Amer. Math. Soc. 38 (2): 201–236. doi:10.1090/s0002-9947-1935-1501809-8. MR 1501809.
- Evans, Griffith C. (1936). "Potentials and positively infinite singularities of harmonic functions". Monatshefte für Mathematik und Physik. 43 (1): 419–424. doi:10.1007/BF01707623. S2CID 121749166.
- Evans, G. C. (1937). "Modern methods of analysis in potential theory" (PDF). Bull. Amer. Math. Soc. 48 (3): 481–502. doi:10.1090/S0002-9904-1937-06579-7. MR 1563577.
- Evans, G. C. (1941). "Continua of minimum capacity" (PDF). Bull. Amer. Math. Soc. 47 (10): 717–733. doi:10.1090/s0002-9904-1941-07541-5. MR 0005261.
- Lectures on multiple valued harmonic functions in space. University of California Press. 1951.
- Functionals and their applications; selected topics including integral equations. Dover. 1964.

== Biographical references ==
- Morrey, C. B. Jr.; Lewy, H.; Shephard, R. W.; Vaught, R. L. (May 1977), "Griffith Conrad Evans, Mathematics: Berkeley 1887-1973, Professor", 1977, University of California: In Memoriam, Berkeley, CA: University of California, Berkeley, pp. 102–103
- Morrey, Charles B. Jr. (1983), "Griffith Conrad Evans", in National Academy of Sciences of the United States of America (ed.), Biographical Memoirs, vol. 54, Washington, D.C.: National Academy Press, pp. 126–155, ISBN 978-0-309-03391-6.
- Rider, Robin E. (1985), "An opportune time: Griffith C. Evans and mathematics at Berkeley" (PDF), in Duren, Peter (ed.), A Century of Mathematics in America, Part II, History of Mathematics, vol. 2, Providence: American Mathematical Society, pp. 283–302, ISBN 978-0-8218-0130-7, MR 1003134, Zbl 0671.01027.
- Simon, H. A. (2008), "Evans, Griffith Conrad (1887–1973)", The New Palgrave Dictionary of Economics, vol. In: Palgrave Macmillan (eds) The New Palgrave Dictionary of Economics., Palgrave Macmillan, pp. 1–3, doi:10.1057/978-1-349-95121-5_552-2, ISBN 978-1-349-95121-5
