= Quasiconvexity (calculus of variations) =

Generalisation of convexity

In the calculus of variations, a subfield of mathematics, quasiconvexity is a generalisation of the notion of convexity. It is used to characterise the integrand of a functional and related to the existence of minimisers. Under some natural conditions, quasiconvexity of the integrand is a necessary and sufficient condition for a functional
$$\mathcal{F}: W^{1,p}(\Omega, \mathbb{R}^m) \rightarrow \R \qquad u \mapsto \int_\Omega f(x, u(x), \nabla u(x)) dx$$
to be lower semi-continuous in the weak topology, for a sufficient regular domain $\Omega \subset \mathbb{R}^d$. By compactness arguments (Banach–Alaoglu theorem) the existence of minimisers of weakly lower semicontinuous functionals may then follow from the direct method. This concept was introduced by Morrey in 1952. This generalisation of convexity should not be confused with the polysemetic concept of a quasiconvex function.

== Definition ==
A locally bounded Borel-measurable function $f:\mathbb{R}^{m\times d} \rightarrow \mathbb{R}$ is called quasiconvex if
$$\int_{B(0,1)} \bigl(f(A + \nabla \psi(x)) - f(A)\bigr)dx \geq 0$$
for all $A \in \mathbb{R}^{m\times d}$ and all $\psi \in W_0^{1,\infty}(B(0,1), \mathbb{R}^m)$ , where B(0,1) is the unit ball and $W_0^{1,\infty}$ is the Sobolev space of essentially bounded functions with essentially bounded derivative and vanishing trace.

== Properties of quasiconvex functions ==
- The domain B(0,1) can be replaced by any other bounded Lipschitz domain.
- Quasiconvex functions are locally Lipschitz-continuous.
- In the definition the space $W_0^{1,\infty}$ can be replaced by periodic Sobolev functions.

== Relations to other notions of convexity ==
Quasiconvexity is a generalisation of convexity for functions defined on matrices, to see this let $A \in \mathbb{R}^{m\times d}$ and $V \in L^1(B(0,1), \mathbb{R}^m)$ with $\int_{B(0,1)} V(x)dx = 0$. The Riesz-Markov-Kakutani representation theorem states that the dual space of $C_0(\mathbb{R}^{m\times d})$ can be identified with the space of signed, finite Radon measures on it. We define a Radon measure $\mu$ by
$$\langle h, \mu\rangle = \frac{1}{|B(0,1)|} \int_{B(0,1)} h(A + V(x)) dx$$
for $h \in C_0(\mathbb{R}^{m\times d})$. It can be verified that $\mu$ is a probability measure and its barycenter is given
$$[\mu] = \langle \operatorname{id}, \mu \rangle = A + \int_{B(0,1)} V(x) dx = A.$$
If h is a convex function, then Jensens' Inequality gives
$$h(A) = h([\mu]) \leq \langle h, \mu \rangle = \frac{1}{|B(0,1)|} \int_{B(0,1)} h(A + V(x)) dx.$$
This holds in particular if V(x) is the derivative of $\psi \in W_0^{1,\infty}(B(0,1), \mathbb{R}^{m\times d})$ by the generalised Stokes' Theorem.

The determinant $\det \mathbb{R}^{d\times d} \rightarrow \mathbb{R}$ is an example of a quasiconvex function, which is not convex. To see that the determinant is not convex, consider
$$A = \begin{pmatrix} 1 & 0 \\ 0 & 0 \\ \end{pmatrix}
\quad \text{and} \quad
B = \begin{pmatrix} 0 & 0 \\ 0 & 1 \\ \end{pmatrix}.$$
It then holds $\det A = \det B = 0$ but for $\lambda \in (0,1)$ we have $\det (\lambda A + (1-\lambda)B) = \lambda(1-\lambda) > 0 = \max(\det A, \det B)$. This shows that the determinant is not a quasiconvex function like in Game Theory and thus a distinct notion of convexity.

In the vectorial case of the Calculus of Variations there are other notions of convexity. For a function $f: \mathbb{R}^{m\times d} \rightarrow \mathbb{R}$ it holds that
$$f \text{ convex} \Rightarrow f \text{ polyconvex} \Rightarrow f \text{ quasiconvex} \Rightarrow
f \text{ rank-1-convex}.$$

These notions are all equivalent if $d = 1$ or $m=1$. Already in 1952, Morrey conjectured that rank-1-convexity does not imply quasiconvexity. This was a major unsolved problem in the Calculus of Variations, until Šverák gave an counterexample in 1993 for the case $d \geq 2$ and $m \geq 3$. The case $d = 2$ or $m = 2$ is still an open problem, known as Morrey's conjecture.

== Relation to weak lower semi-continuity ==
Under certain growth condition of the integrand, the sequential weakly lower semi-continuity (swlsc) of an integral functional in an appropriate Sobolev space is equivalent to the quasiconvexity of the integrand. Acerbi and Fusco proved the following theorem:

Theorem: If $f: \mathbb{R}^d \times \mathbb{R}^m \times \mathbb{R}^{d\times m} \rightarrow \mathbb{R}, (x,v,A) \mapsto f(x,v,A)$ is Carathéodory function and it holds $0\leq f(x,v,A) \leq a(x) + C(|v|^p + |A|^p)$. Then the functional
$$\mathcal{F}[u] = \int_\Omega f(x, u(x),\nabla u(x)) dx$$
is swlsc in the Sobolev Space $W^{1,p}(\Omega, \mathbb{R}^m)$ with $p > 1$ if and only if $f$ is quasiconvex. Here $C$ is a positive constant and $a(x)$ an integrable function.

Other authors use different growth conditions and different proof conditions. The first proof of it was due to Morrey in his paper, but he required additional assumptions.
