= Guéant =

Guéant is a French surname. Notable people with the surname include:

- Claude Guéant (born 1945), French former civil servant
- Olivier Guéant (fl. 2008), French mathematician
