= François Golse =

French mathematician (born 1962)

Golse at Oberwolfach in 2026

François Golse (born 10 September 1962 in Talence) is a French mathematician.

Golse was awarded a doctorate in 1986 at the Paris XIII University with thesis advisor Claude Bardos and thesis Contributions à l'étude des équations du transfert radiatif. In 1987 he became a scientist of CNRS at the École normale supérieure. In 1993 he became a professor at Pierre and Marie Curie University (Paris VI). He has been a professor at the École Polytechnique since 2006.

Golse does research on partial differential equations. With Laure Saint-Raymond in 2004 he showed a connection of the weak solutions of the Boltzmann equation with the Leray solutions of the incompressible Navier-Stokes equations. For these mathematically rigorous results on the hydrodynamic limit of the Boltzmann equation of gas dynamics he received the SIAG-APDE Prize of SIAM (for the best work on partial differential equations) with Saint-Raymond in 2006. He also deals with other equations of mathematical physics, including distribution of free path lengths in the Lorentz gas, hydrodynamic limits of other kinetic equations, and time-dependent Hartree–Fock method.

In 2004 he gave a plenary lecture Hydrodynamic limits at the European Congress of Mathematicians. In 2006 he was an Invited Speaker with talk The periodic Lorentz gas in the Boltzmann-Grad limit at the International Congress of Mathematicians in Madrid.

He is a member of the Institut Universitaire de France. He received the Louis Armand Prize of the French Academy of Sciences and the Claude Antoine Peccot Prize of the Collège de France.

== Major publications ==
- Golse, François; Lions, Pierre-Louis; Perthame, Benoît; Sentis, Rémi. Regularity of the moments of the solution of a transport equation. J. Funct. Anal. 76 (1988), no. 1, 110–125.
- Bardos, Claude; Golse, François; Levermore, David. Fluid dynamic limits of kinetic equations. I. Formal derivations. J. Statist. Phys. 63 (1991), no. 1-2, 323–344.
- Bardos, Claude; Golse, François; Levermore, C. David. Fluid dynamic limits of kinetic equations. II. Convergence proofs for the Boltzmann equation. Comm. Pure Appl. Math. 46 (1993), no. 5, 667–753.
- Golse, François; Saint-Raymond, Laure. The Navier-Stokes limit of the Boltzmann equation for bounded collision kernels. Invent. Math. 155 (2004), no. 1, 81–161. doi:10.1007/s00222-003-0316-5
