= Olivier Guéant =

French mathematician

Olivier Guéant is a French mathematician, focusing on mean field game theory and financial mathematics. He is currently a Full Professor of applied mathematics at the Université Paris Cité.

== Background ==
Guéant studied mathematics and economics at Ecole Normale Supérieure and also studied at Harvard. He defended the first PhD thesis on mean field games under the supervision of Pierre-Louis Lions. Guéant's PhD was awarded the Rosemont Demassieux prize.

In 2010, along with Jean-Michel Lasry, Pierre-Louis Lions, and Henri Verdier, Guéant founded a start-up called MFG-Labs, pioneering Big Data. The company was acquired by Havas Media in 2013.

From 2010 to 2016, Guéant served as Associate professor in applied mathematics at Paris Diderot University, and then as full Professor of applied mathematics at the Sorbonne from 2016 to 2025 and he currently holds a Full Professorship at Université Paris Cité.

His research on financial mathematics focuses on optimal execution and market making. He also worked with Roger Guesnerie, Jean-Michel Lasry and Olivier David Zerbib on environmental interest rates.

Between 2014 and 2017, Guéant was sitting on the Scientific Advisory Board of Havas Media.

== Mathematical modelling in finance ==
As an expert of financial mathematics and stochastic control, Guéant has published several books and articles on liquidity management, optimal orders execution and multi-asset market making. He is also an expert on pricing and asset management. Along with Charles-Albert Lehalle and Joaquin Fernandez-Tapia, he notably solved the Avellaneda-Stoikov equations, which are key to dealing with inventory risk in market making.

== Books ==
- Paris-Princeton Lectures on Mathematical Finance 2010, 2011
- The Financial Mathematics of Market Liquidity: From Optimal Execution to Market Making, 2016

== Awards ==
- AAENSAE Prize for his research on environmental interest rates, 2008 (with Olivier David Zerbib)
- Rosemont-Demassieux Prize for his PhD on mean field game theory, 2010
- IEF-FBF Prize of the best paper in Finance, 2016 (with Charles-Albert Lehalle)
- Best Young Researcher in Finance and Insurance 2023 (IEF/Scor Foundation for Science)
