= Guido Stampacchia =

Italian mathematician (1922–1978)

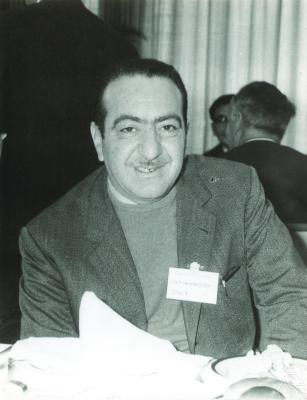
- Stampacchia in 1969
- Born: 26 March 1922; Naples, Italy
- Died: 27 April 1978 (aged 56); Paris, France
- Occupation: Mathematician

Guido Stampacchia (26 March 1922 – 27 April 1978) was an Italian mathematician, known for his work on the theory of variational inequalities, the calculus of variation and the theory of elliptic partial differential equations.

== Life and academic career ==
Stampacchia was born in Naples, Italy, to Emanuele Stampacchia and Giulia Campagnano. He obtained his high school certification from the Liceo-Ginnasio Giambattista Vico in Naples in classical subjects, although he showed a stronger aptitude for mathematics and physics.

In 1940 he was admitted to the Scuola Normale Superiore di Pisa for undergraduate studies in pure mathematics. He was drafted in March 1943 but nevertheless managed to take examinations during the summer before joining the resistance movement against the Germans in the defence of Rome in September. He was discharged in June 1945.

In 1944 he won a scholarship to the University of Naples which allowed him to continue his studies. In the 1945–1946 academic year he declined a specialization at the Scuola Normale in the Faculty of Sciences in favour of an assistant position at the Istituto Universitario Navale. In 1949 he was appointed as assistant with tenure to the chair of mathematical analysis, and in 1951 he obtained his "Libera docenza". In 1952 won a national competition for the chair at the University of Palermo. He was nominated Professor on Probation at the University of Genoa later the same year and was promoted to full Professor in 1955.

He married fellow student Sara Naldini in October 1948. Children Mauro, Renata, Giulia, and Franca were born in 1949, 1951, 1955 and 1956 respectively.

Stampacchia was active in research and teaching throughout his career. He made key contributions to a number of fields, including calculus of variation, variational inequalities and differential equations. In 1967 Stampacchia was elected President of the Unione Matematica Italiana. It was about this time that his research efforts shifted toward the emerging field of variational inequalities, which he modelled after boundary value problems for partial differential equations. He was also director of the Istituto per le Applicazioni del Calcolo of Consiglio Nazionale delle Ricerche from December 1968 to 1974.

Stampacchia accepted the position of Professor of Mathematical Analysis at the University of Rome in 1968 and returned to the University of Pise in 1970 and subsequently with the chair of Higher Analysis at the Scuola Normale Superiore. In early 1978 he suffered a serious heart attack and died of heart arrest on 27 April that year while he was in Paris as a Visiting Professor.

The Stampacchia Medal, an international prize awarded every three years for contributions to the Calculus of Variations, was established in 2003.

== Selected works ==
- Stampacchia, Guido (1963), "Second order elliptic equations and boundary value problems", Proceedings of the International Congress of Mathematicians, 15–22 August 1962, Stockholm (PDF), ICM Proceedings, vol. 1962, Vol. 1, Stockholm: Almqvist & Wiksells, pp. 405–413, MR 0176198, Zbl 0137.06803, archived from the original (PDF) on 21 December 2016.
- with Sergio Campanato, Sulle maggiorazioni in L^{p} nella teoria delle equazioni ellittiche, Bollettino dell'Unione Matematica Italiana, Bologna, Zanichelli, 1965.
- with Jaurès Cecconi, Lezioni di analisi matematica, I: Funzioni di una variabile, Naples: Liguori editore, 1974, ISBN 88-207-0127-8
- with Jaurès Cecconi, Lezioni di analisi matematica, II: Funzioni di più variabili, Naples: Liguori, 1980, ISBN 88-207-1022-6
- with Jaurès Cecconi and Livio Clemente Piccinini, Esercizi e problemi di analisi matematica, Naples: Liguori, 1996, ISBN 88-207-0744-6, ISBN 978-88-207-0744-6
- Piccinini, Livio C.; Stampacchia, Guido; Vidossich, Giovanni (1978), Equazioni differenziali ordinarie in R^{n} (problemi e metodi), Serie di matematica e Fisica "T" (in Italian), vol. 5, Naples: Liguori Editore, p. 452, ISBN 978-88-207-0728-6, translated in English as Piccinini, Livio C.; Stampacchia, Guido; Vidossich, Giovanni (1984) [1978], Ordinary differential equations in R^{n}. Problems and methods, Applied Mathematical Sciences, vol. 39, translated by LoBello, A., New York: Springer-Verlag, pp. xii+385, doi:10.1007/978-1-4612-5188-0, ISBN 0-387-90723-8, MR 0740539, Zbl 0535.34001.
- with David Kinderlehrer: An introduction to variational inequalities and their applications, NY, Academic Press, 1980
  - Reprint: Society for Industrial and Applied Mathematics, 2000 ISBN 978-0-89871-466-1 (doi:10.1137/1.9780898719451.fm)
