= Laure Saint-Raymond =

French mathematician (born 1975)

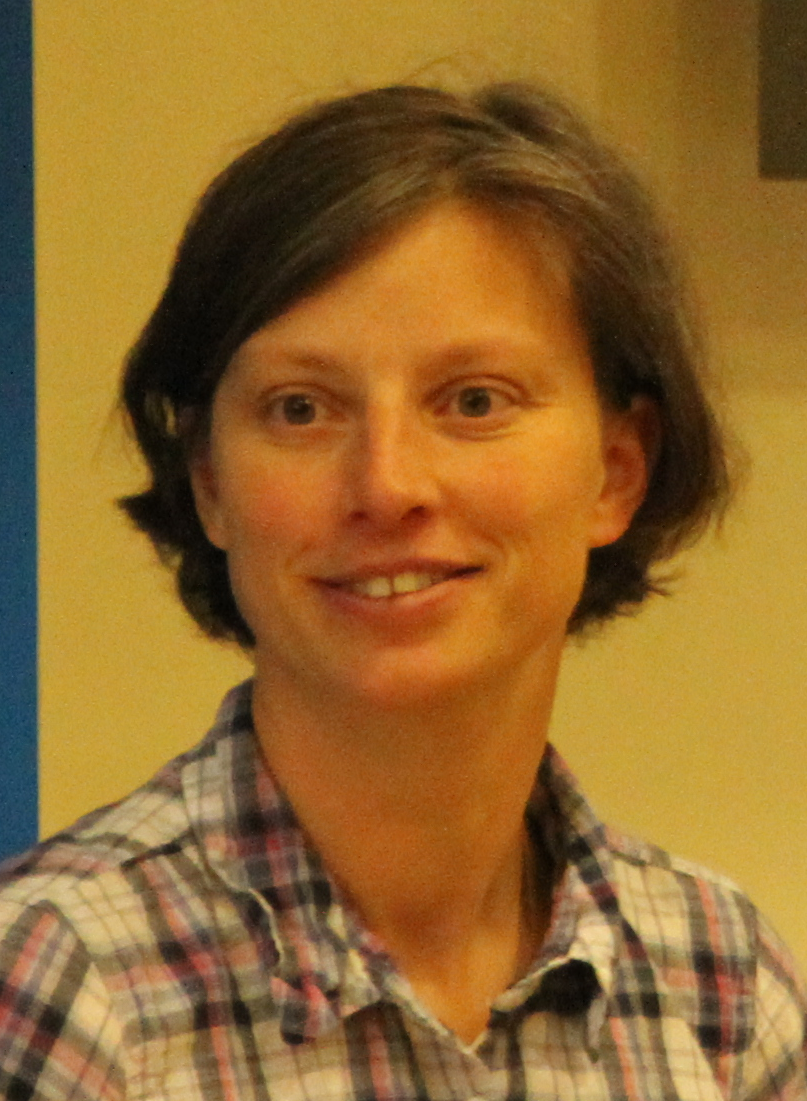
- Saint-Raymond in 2011
- Born: 4 August 1975 (age 51)
- Education: École Normale Supérieure; Paris Diderot University
- Awards: EMS Prize (2008); Satter Prize (2009); Fermat Prize (2015); Bôcher Prize (2020)
- Scientific career
- Fields: Mathematics
- Workplaces: Institut des Hautes Etudes Scientifiques
- Doctoral advisor: François Golse

Laure Saint-Raymond (born 1975) is a French mathematician, and a professor of mathematics at Institut des Hautes Études Scientifiques (IHES). She was previously a professor at École Normale Supérieure de Lyon. She is known for her work in partial differential equations, and in particular for her contributions to the mathematically rigorous study of the connections between interacting particle systems, the Boltzmann equation, and fluid mechanics. In 2008 she was awarded the European Mathematical Society Prize, with her citation reading:

Saint-Raymond is well known for her outstanding results on nonlinear partial differential equations in the dynamics of gases and plasmas and also in fluid dynamics. [...] Saint-Raymond is at the origin of several outstanding and difficult results in the field of nonlinear partial differential equations of mathematical physics. She is one of the most brilliant young mathematicians in her generation.

== Biography ==
Laure Saint-Raymond studied in Paris, entering École Normale Supérieure in 1994. In 1996, she received a Master's degrees in plasma physics from Versailles Saint-Quentin-en-Yvelines University and in applied mathematics from Pierre and Marie Curie University. In 2000 she finished her Ph.D. in applied mathematics at Paris Diderot University, under the supervision of François Golse.

She worked for two years for the French National Centre for Scientific Research, and was named in 2002 full professor of mathematics at the Pierre and Marie Curie University at the age of 27. In 2007, she moved to the École Normale Supérieure, and is now professor at the École Normale Supérieure de Lyon. In 2021, she joined the Institut des Hautes Études Scientifiques in Bures-sur-Yvette, France as permanent professor, the first woman to hold that position in the history of the Institute.

She is the mother of six children.

== Awards and honors ==
Her work has been recognized by many international awards, notably the Fermat Prize and the Bôcher Memorial Prize. In 2013, she was elected to the French Academy of Sciences, and in 2014 was an invited speaker at the International Congress of Mathematicians. A partial list of her awards and honors include:

- 2003 : Louis Armand Prize of the French Academy of Sciences
- 2004 : Claude-Antoine Peccot Award of Collège de France
- 2004 : Pius XI Medal of the Pontifical Academy of Sciences
- 2006 : The Best Paper prize of the SIAM Activity Group on Analysis of PDE for:

(with François Golse) "The Navier-Stokes limit of the Boltzmann equation for bounded collision kernels." Invent. Math. 155 (2004), no. 1, 81–161.

- 2006 : Prize of the City of Paris for Young Scientists (joint with Isabelle Gallagher)
- 2008 : Prize of the European Mathematical Society
- 2009 : Ruth Lyttle Satter Prize in Mathematics of the American Mathematical Society for:

(with François Golse) "The Navier-Stokes limit of the Boltzmann equation for bounded collision kernels." Invent. Math. 155 (2004), no. 1, 81–161.
"Convergence of solutions to the Boltzmann equation in the incompressible Euler limit." Arch. Ration. Mech. Anal. 166 (2003), no. 1, 47–80.

- 2011 : Irène Joliot-Curie Prize of the "Young Scientist Woman"
- 2013 : Elected to the French Academy of Sciences (on 10 December 2013)
- 2015 : Fermat Prize for:

the development of asymptotic theories of partial differential equations, including the fluid limits of rarefied flows, multiscale analysis in plasma physics equations and ocean modeling, and the derivation of the Boltzmann equation from interacting particle systems.

- 2015: Elected to the Academia Europaea
- 2020: Bôcher Memorial Prize for:

her transformative contributions to kinetic theory, fluid dynamics, and Hilbert's sixth problem

- 2022: elected as an international member to the National Academy of Sciences (NAS).

== Research ==
In 2009, her work was summarized by the Satter Prize committee as:

Her research has focused on the study of problems in mathematical physics, including the Boltzmann equation and its fluid dynamic limits, the Vlasov-Poisson system and its gyrokinetic limit, and problems of rotating fluids coming from geophysics. Her most striking work concerns the study of the hydrodynamic limits of the Boltzmann equation in the kinetic theory of gases, where she answered part of a question posed by Hilbert within the framework of his sixth problem.

== Major publications ==
- Golse, François; Saint-Raymond, Laure (9 September 2003). "The Navier–Stokes limit of the Boltzmann equation for bounded collision kernels". Inventiones Mathematicae. 155 (1). Springer Science and Business Media LLC: 81–161. doi:10.1007/s00222-003-0316-5. ISSN 0020-9910. S2CID 55061640.
- Saint-Raymond, Laure (2009). Hydrodynamic limits of the Boltzmann equation. Berlin. ISBN 978-3-540-92847-8. OCLC 405547139.
