= Marion Morrey Richter =

American musician

Dr. Marion Morrey Richter (2 October 1900 - 6 January 1996) was an American composer, music educator and pianist who toured internationally. She held several leadership positions in the National Federation of Music Clubs.

Richter was born in Columbus, Ohio, to Dr. Charles Bradfield Morrey, a bacteriologist, and Grace Hamilton Morrey, a concert pianist and music educator. Her brother Charles Bradfield Morrey Jr. became a well-known mathematician. She married Otto Clarence Richter in 1928 and they had one son.

Richter’s mother was her first music teacher. She went on to earn a B.A. at Ohio State University, as well as a master’s degree and a doctorate in music education from Columbia University. She also studied at the Juilliard School, receiving fellowships there from 1925-29.

Richter’s teaching career included work at:

- 1917-22 the Morrey School (her mother’s music school)
- 1923-28 Heckscher Foundation
- 1929-52 Columbia University summer school
- 1934-52 Juilliard summer school.

Richter presented lectures and piano recitals throughout the United States and in China, India, Indonesia, Japan, South Korea, and the Soviet Union. An active member of the National Federation of Music Clubs (NFMC), she was a NFMC Rose Fay Thomas Fellow and chaired the NFMC American Music Department. As the NFMC Radio Chair, she selected music for monthly broadcasts on WNYC for 20 years. Today, the NFMC sponsors the annual Marion Richter American Music Composition Award for promising student/collegiate composers.

Richter wrote the liner notes for commercial recordings of works by Alan Hovhaness (CRI SD 326) and Vally Weigl (MHS 3880). Her compositions were published by C.C. Birchard and include:

== Band ==
- Timberjack Overture

== Chamber ==
- Sonata for Piano Trio

== Opera ==
- Distant Drums
- This is Our Camp (for children; text by Margaret Raymond)

== Orchestra ==
- The Waste Land (after T. S. Eliot)

== Piano ==
- Capriccio
- Carol Suite
- Prelude on a Twelve Tone Row
- Scherzo Fantastique
- Scherzo-Intermezzo

== Vocal ==
- A Ship Comes In (men’s chorus)
- “Cycle of Seasons”
- “Daffodils” (text by William Wordsworth)
- “Hymn of Glory”
- “In Winter”
- “Longing”
- Sea Chant (women’s chorus)
- “Silence Sings”
- Tale of a Timberjack (men’s chorus)
