= Sergio Campanato =

Italian mathematician (1930–2005)

- Born: 17 February 1930; Venice, Italy
- Died: 1 March 2005 (aged 75); Pisa, Italy
- Education: University of Modena
- Scientific career
- Fields: Mathematics
- Workplaces: University of Pisa, Scuola Normale Superiore di Pisa

Sergio Campanato (17 February 1930 – 1 March 2005) was an Italian mathematician who studied the theory of regularity for elliptic and parabolic partial differential equations.

== Career ==
He graduated in mathematics and physics at the University of Modena in the academic year 1952/54 with a thesis relating to the heat equation. In 1956, he became an assistant to Enrico Magenes, with whom he worked on a problem of Picone relating to the equilibrium state of an elastic body, and on other differential equations related to electrostatics.

In 1964, he moved to the University of Pisa at the invitation of Alessandro Faedo, joining a group of mathematicians which included Aldo Andreotti, Jacopo Barsotti, Enrico Bombieri, Gianfranco Capriz, Ennio De Giorgi, Giovanni Prodi, Edoardo Vesentini, and Guido Stampacchia, with whom Campanato collaborated fruitfully.

From 1975 until 2000 he taught Nonlinear Analysis at the Scuola Normale Superiore di Pisa. He died in Pisa on 1 March 2005.

== Honors ==
- In 1985, the Accademia dei Lincei awarded him the "Premio Linceo" prize for his work on the regularity of nonlinear problems as relating to his eponymous Morrey–Campanato spaces.
- In 2000, a conference was held in honor of his 70th birthday at SNS Pisa.
- In 2006, there was a conference held to commemorate his work at Erice, Sicily.

== Selected works ==
- Sui problemi al contorno relativi al sistema di equazioni differenziali dell'elastostatica piana. Rend. Sem. Mat. Univ. Di Padova 1956 XXV pp. 307–342
- Osservazioni sul problema di trasmissione per equazioni differenziali lineari del secondo ordine, Edizioni dell'Università di Genova, 1960.
- Sergio Campanato, Guido Stampacchia, Sulle maggiorazioni in Lp nella teoria delle equazioni ellittiche, Bollettino dell'Unione Matematica Italiana, Serie 3, Vol. 20 (1965), n.3, p. 393–399. Bologna, Zanichelli, 1965.
- Lezioni di analisi matematica, Pisa, Libreria scientifica Giordano Pellegrini, 1966.
- Sistemi ellittici in forma divergenza: regolarità all'interno, Pisa, edizioni della Scuola Normale Superiore, 1980.
- Regolarità Hölderiana parziale delle soluzioni di una classe di sistemi ellittici non lineari del secondo ordine, Bari, Laterza, 1982:
- Recent regularity results for H1,q-solutions on non linear elliptic systems, Volume 186 di Conferenze del Seminario di matematica dell'Università di Bari, Bari, Laterza, 1983.
- Teoria ... [L] e sistemi parabolici non lineari, Volume 196 di Conferenze del Seminario di Matematica dell'Università di Bari, Bari Laterza, 1984.
- Non variational basic parabolic systems of second order-(Sistemi parabolici base non variazionali del 2º ordine), in: Atti dell'Accademia Nazionale dei Lincei. Classe di Scienze Fisiche, Matematiche e Naturali. Rendiconti Lincei. Matematica e Applicazioni Serie 9 2, fasc. n.2, p. 129–136, 1991.
- Attuale formulazione della teoria degli operatori vicini e attuale definizione di operatore ellittico, Le Matematiche, Vol. LI (1996) Fasc. II, pp. 291–298, 1996.
