= Charles F. Roos =

American economist (1901–1958)

- Born: May 18, 1901; New Orleans, Louisiana
- Died: January 6, 1958 (aged 56); New York City

Academic background
- Education: Rice University
- Doctoral advisor: Griffith C. Evans

Academic work
- Discipline: Mathematical economics
- Doctoral students: Helen Calkins

Charles Frederick Roos (May 18, 1901 – January 6, 1958) was an American economist who made contributions to mathematical economics. He was one of the founders of the Econometric Society together with American economist Irving Fisher and Norwegian economist Ragnar Frisch in 1930. He served as secretary-treasurer during the first year of the society and was elected as president in 1948. He was director of research of the Cowles Commission from September 1934 to January 1937.

Roos earned a PhD in mathematics from Rice University in 1926, under supervision of Griffith C. Evans. He was amongst the first, together with Evans and mathematician Frank P. Ramsey, to use the calculus of variations in mathematical economics. His direct involvement with two key institutions in economic history, both the Econometric Society and the Cowles Commission, place him in a pivotal position in the mathematization of economics in the first half of the 20th century. His own work, however, would not be so influential. Mathematical economics and econometrics eventually favored technical and epistemological approaches that were different from his own.

== Biography ==
Charles Frederick Roos was born in New Orleans, Louisiana on 18 May 1901. He studied mathematics at the Rice Institute, receiving his Bachelor of Arts degree in 1921, his Master of Arts degree in 1924, and, being awarded his PhD in 1926. His main interests were in the calculus of variations, integral equations, and the applications of these to economic theory. His early research was deeply inspired by the work of his thesis advisor Griffith C. Evans who used these same mathematical tools to analyze business cycles, economic equilibrium, and economic competition. During the following years, from 1926 to 1928, Roos continued his academic studies as National Research Fellow at the University of Chicago and Princeton University.

At Princeton, Roos met the Norwegian economist Ragnar Frisch who was travelling there under a grant from the Rockefeller Foundation. They shared a common sentiment that economics should be brought closer to mathematics and to statistics (this would later become known as econometrics) and decided to request support from American economist Irving Fisher, at Yale University, to help organize an association to research such topics. Later that year, both Frisch and Roos met with Fisher to discuss the formation of what would become the Econometric Society. In 1930 the Econometric Society was founded; Frisch was elected to be its first president, and Roos its secretary-treasurer. During this period, Roos had also been serving as secretary for the American Association for the Advancement of Science (AAAS) where he oversaw Section K of economics, sociology and statistics. This position also allowed him to bring together subjects of his interest such as the applications of statistics to the social sciences, and also to invite fellow members of the Econometric Society to lecture and present research on such topics.

Following his National Research Fellowship Roos was hired as assistant professor of mathematics at Cornell University. He resigned this position in 1931 to assume a position as permanent secretary at the AAAS where he arranged programs in economics. In the wake of the Great Depression Roos organized a symposium on unemployment; the papers presented at this meeting were later published by the AAAS in a book entitled Stabilization of Employment. In 1933 Roos resigns from the AAAS to study mathematical economics in England under a Güggenheim fellowship. He quickly declines this fellowship, however, as he was called to be principal economist and director of research of the newly created National Recovery Administration (NRA). Roos' work during the short period he served as director of the NRA was later published by the Principia Press in 1937. Only a couple years later, in May 1935, the Supreme Court ruled that the NRA was unconstitutional and the organization was dissolved.

Already in 1934 Alfred Cowles approached Roos about a position to be professor of econometrics at Colorado College and director of research in the newly founded Cowles Commission for Economic Research based in Colorado Springs. Cowles was no stranger to Roos as the latter had previously reached out to him and Fisher with interests in researching forecasting methods. Following the stock market crash in 1929, Cowles realized his own forecasting techniques were mostly guesswork and endeavored to seriously research the subject. Through a common acquaintance, he met American mathematician Harold T. Davis, a professor at Indiana University who recommended that he look into the Econometric Society. Cowles contacted Frisch and Roos and decided to fully fund both the Econometric Society and its journal Econometrica.

Roos accepted Cowles' offer to come to Colorado. Besides being the commission's director he also wrote the first Cowles Monograph entitled Dynamic Economics: Theoretical and Statistical Studies of Demand, Production and Prices. This work was a summary of much his previous research and academic work in dynamic economics and explored many business applications such as in the demand for gasoline, agricultural products, and residential building. The Cowles Commission would later become an important institution in mathematical economics specially associated with Walrasian general-equilibrium theory and general-equilibrium models. Many nobel laureates in economics were associated with the Commission and/or wrote a Cowles Monograph. Some examples include Kenneth Arrow (social choice), Gerard Debreu (general equilibrium), Tjalling Koopmans (activity analysis, linear programming), Lawrence Klein (economic fluctuations), and Harry Markowitz (portfolio selection). The second Cowles Monograph was also written by Roos based on his work at the NRA.

Roos' business interests lead him to New York in 1937, where, a couple years later, he founded the Institute for Applied Econometrics (later renamed to Econometric Institute). The firm worked with big businesses such as General Motors and offered broad forecasting services. Roos' work with automobile industry resulted in the book The Dynamics of Automobile Demand, published in 1939. In the same year, Roos was named a Fellow of the American Statistical Association. He would work as director of the Econometric Institute until his death on January 7, 1956. While the latter part of Roos' career saw a decline in his academic publications he still found ways to keep himself active and even published in a survey article in Econometrica in 1955.

== Mathematical economics ==
Charles Roos was one of the first to employ the calculus of variations to economic theory. His work follows closely that of his PhD advisor Griffith Evans and is partly inspired by the works of Vilfredo Pareto, Léon Walras, and Cournot. His main interest was to develop a dynamic theory of economics and he most commonly framed his analysis as a profit maximization problem solved by a firm. Solving this by means of differential calculus determines the optimal amount of production in a given instant of time. Roos' approach, on the other hand, allowed one to determine the optimal amounts of production during an interval of time, allowing for prices to change during this period. His 1925 article A Mathematical Theory of Competition explores this situation under the hypothesis of monopoly and that of a large number of individual producers. In his later work he extends this to a general-equilibrium framework by considering how producers and consumers would converge to market equilibrium over a given interval of time. Most of these contributions were summarized in the first Cowles Monograph Dynamic Economics: Theoretical and Statistical Studies of Demand, Production and Prices published in 1934.

== List of publications ==
- Roos, Charles (1925). "A Mathematical Theory of Competition". American Journal of Mathematics. 47 (3): 163–175. doi:10.2307/2370550. JSTOR 2370550.
- Roos, Charles (1927). "A Dynamical Theory of Economics". Journal of Political Economy. 35 (5): 632–656. doi:10.1086/253888. JSTOR 1822166. S2CID 154430942.
- Roos, Charles (1928). "Generalized Lagrange Problems in the Calculus of Variations". Transactions of the American Mathematical Society. 30 (2): 360–384. doi:10.1090/S0002-9947-1928-1501432-1. JSTOR 1989126.
- Roos, Charles (1928). "The Problem of Depreciation in the Calculus of Variations" (PDF). Bull. Amer. Math. Soc. 34 (2): 218–228. doi:10.1090/S0002-9904-1928-04517-2.
- Roos, Charles (1929). "Some Problems of Business Forecasting". Proceedings of the National Academy of Sciences of the United States of America. 15 (3): 186–191. Bibcode:1929PNAS...15..186R. doi:10.1073/pnas.15.3.186. PMC 522430. PMID 16577163.
- Roos, Charles (1930). "A Mathematical Theory of Price and Production Fluctuations and Economic Crises". Journal of Political Economy. 38 (5): 501–522. doi:10.1086/254137. JSTOR 1822983. S2CID 154049543.
- Roos, Charles; American Association for the Advancement of Science (1933). Stabilization of employment: papers presented at the Atlantic City meeting of the American association for the advancement of science, including a summary of results. Principia Press. p. 300.
- Charles Frederick Roos (1934). Dynamic Economics: Theoretical and Statistical Studies of Demand, Production and Prices. Principia Press, Incorporated.
- Roos, Charles (1937). NRA Economic Planning (PDF). Principia Press.
- Waddill Catchings; Charles Frederick Roos (1953). Money, Men, and Machines. Duell, Sloan and Pearce.
- Roos, Charles (1955). "Survey of Economic Forecasting Techniques: A Survey Article". Econometrica. 23 (4): 363–395. doi:10.2307/1905345. JSTOR 1905345.
- Charles Frederick Roos (1957). The dynamics of economic growth: the American economy, 1957-1975. Econometric Institute.
