= Ronald Shephard =

American economist and professor

Ronald W. Shephard
- Born: November 22, 1912
- Died: July 22, 1982 (aged 69)
- Education: University of California, Berkeley
- Known for: Shephard's lemma
- Scientific career
- Fields: Mathematical economics
- Doctoral advisor: Griffith C. Evans

Ronald William Shephard (November 22, 1912 – July 22, 1982) was professor of engineering science at the University of California, Berkeley.

He is best known for two results in economics, now known as Shephard's lemma and the Shephard duality theorem. Shephard proved these results in his book Theory of Cost and Production Functions (Princeton University Press, 1953), which Dale W. Jorgenson, in the preface of a reprint, called "the most original contribution to economic theory of all time."
