= David Kinderlehrer =

American mathematician (born 1941)

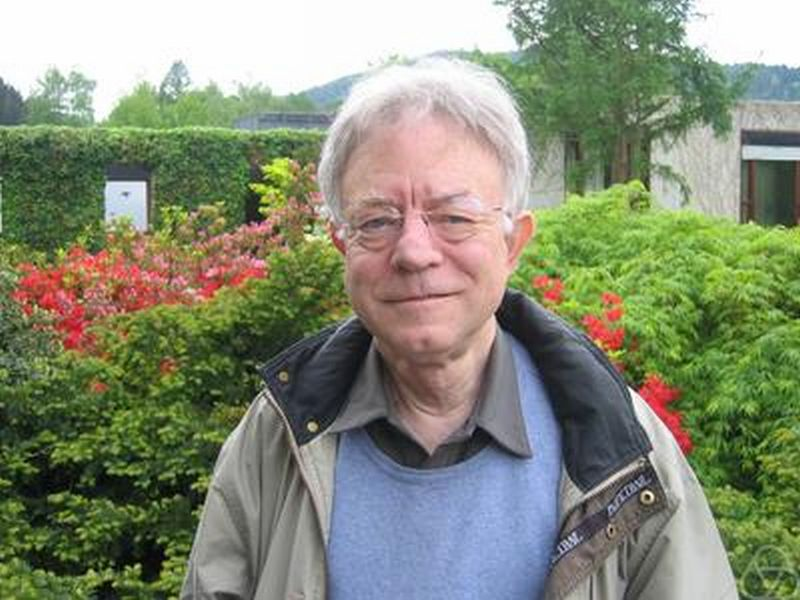
- Kinderlehrer at Oberwolfach (2006)
- Born: October 23, 1941 (age 85); Allentown, Pennsylvania, U.S.

Academic background
- Education: MIT; University of California, Berkeley
- Thesis: Minimal surfaces whose boundaries contain spikes (1968)
- Doctoral advisor: Hans Lewy

Academic work
- Institutions: University of Minnesota; Carnegie Mellon University
- Doctoral students: Irene Fonseca

David Samuel Kinderlehrer (born October 23, 1941) is an American mathematician who works on partial differential equations and related mathematics applied to materials in biology and physics.

== Education and career ==
Kinderlehrer received in 1963 his bachelor's degree from Massachusetts Institute of Technology and in 1968 his Ph.D. from the University of California, Berkeley under Hans Lewy with thesis Minimal surfaces whose boundaries contain spikes. He became in 1968 an instructor and in 1975 a full professor at the University of Minnesota in Minneapolis. For the academic year 1971–1972 he was a visiting professor at the Scuola Normale Superiore di Pisa. In 2003 he became a professor at Carnegie Mellon University.

Kinderlehrer works on partial differential equations, minimal surfaces, and variational inequalities, with mathematical applications to the microstructure of biological materials, to solid state physics, and to materials science, including crystalline microstructure, liquid crystals, molecular mechanisms of intracellular transport, and models of ion transport.

In 2002, Kinderlehrer was the editor of the Hans Lewy Selecta published by Birkhäuser. His doctoral students include Irene Fonseca.

In 2012, Kinderlehrer was elected a Fellow of the American Mathematical Society. In 1974 in Vancouver he was an invited speaker (Elliptic Variational Inequalities) at the International Mathematical Congress.

== Selected publications ==
- Kinderlehrer, David (1972). "How a minimal surface leaves an obstacle". Bull. Amer. Math. Soc. 78 (6): 969–970. doi:10.1090/s0002-9904-1972-13071-4. MR 0306741.
- Kinderlehrer, David (1978). "Variational inequalities and free boundary problems". Bull. Amer. Math. Soc. 84: 7–26. doi:10.1090/s0002-9904-1978-14397-3. MR 0466885.
- with Guido Stampacchia: An introduction to variational inequalities and their applications, Academic Press 1980, SIAM Press 2000
- as editor with Jerald L. Ericksen and Constantine Dafermos: Amorphous Polymers and Non-Newtonian Fluids, Springer Verlag 1987
- as editor with J. L. Ericksen: Theory and application of liquid crystals, Springer Verlag 1987
- as editor with Richard James, Mitchell Luskin, and J. L. Ericksen: Microstructure and phase transition, Springer Verlag 1993
- as editor with Mark J. Bowick, Govind Menon, and Charles Radin: Mathematics and Materials, American Mathematical Society 2017
