= Morrey–Campanato space =

In mathematics, the Morrey–Campanato spaces (named after Charles B. Morrey, Jr. and Sergio Campanato) $L^{\lambda, p}(\Omega)$ are Banach spaces which extend the notion of functions of bounded mean oscillation, describing situations where the oscillation of the function in a ball is proportional to some power of the radius other than the dimension. They are used in the theory of elliptic partial differential equations, since for certain values of $\lambda$, elements of the space $L^{\lambda,p}(\Omega)$ are Hölder continuous functions over the domain $\Omega$.

The seminorm of the Morrey spaces is given by

$$\bigl([u]_{\lambda,p}\bigr)^p = \sup_{0 < r< \operatorname{diam} (\Omega), x_0 \in \Omega} \frac{1}{r^\lambda} \int_{B_r(x_0) \cap \Omega} | u(y) |^p dy.$$

When $\lambda = 0$, the Morrey space is the same as the usual $L^p$ space. When $\lambda = n$, the spatial dimension, the Morrey space is equivalent to $L^\infty$, due to the Lebesgue differentiation theorem. When $\lambda > n$, the space contains only the 0 function.

Note that this is a norm for $p \geq 1$.

The seminorm of the Campanato space is given by

$$\bigl([u]_{\lambda,p}\bigr)^p = \sup_{0 < r< \operatorname{diam} (\Omega), x_0 \in \Omega} \frac{1}{r^\lambda} \int_{B_r(x_0) \cap \Omega} | u(y) - u_{r,x_0} |^p dy$$

where

$$u_{r,x_0} = \frac{1}{|B_r(x_0)\cap \Omega|} \int_{B_r(x_0)\cap \Omega} u(y) dy.$$

It is known that the Morrey spaces with $0 \leq \lambda < n$ are equivalent to the Campanato spaces with the same value of $\lambda$ when $\Omega$ is a sufficiently regular domain, that is to say, when there is a constant A such that $|\Omega \cap B_r(x_0)| > A r^n$ for every $x_0 \in \Omega$ and $r < \operatorname{diam}(\Omega)$.

When $n=\lambda$, the Campanato space is the space of functions of bounded mean oscillation. When $n < \lambda \leq n+p$, the Campanato space is the space of Hölder continuous functions $C^\alpha(\Omega)$ with $\alpha = \frac{\lambda - n}{p}$. For $\lambda > n+p$, the space contains only constant functions.
