= Robert W. Rosenthal =

American economist (1945–2002)

Robert Wernick Rosenthal (1945 – February 27, 2002) was an American economist, most known for his contributions to game theory.

He obtained a B.A. in political economy from Johns Hopkins University (1966), M.S. (1968) and Ph.D. (1971) in operations research from Stanford University, advised by Robert B. Wilson. He worked as assistant professor in the department of Industrial Engineering and management science at Northwestern University (1970–1976), was member of the technical staff at Bell Labs (1976–1983), was professor of economics at Virginia Polytechnic Institute and State University (1983–84), State University of New York at Stony Brook (1984–1987) and Boston University where he worked (1987–2002) until his death from a heart attack. He also had appointments with Massachusetts Institute of Technology (2000), Harvard University (1993), and the Catholic University of Louvain (1973). He held a Fulbright chair in economics at the University of Siena (2001).

He authored many journal articles, and defined the revelation principle and random matching, as applied in works with Henry Landau. Also, he was associate editor of Games and Economic Behavior (1988–2002), Journal of Economic Theory (1999–2002), Mathematics of Operations Research (1981–1988) and Operations Research: A Journal of the Institute for Operations Research and the Management Sciences (1978–1982).

== See also ==
- Mean-field game theory
