= Vincent Calvez =

French mathematician

- Born: 20 August 1981 (age 45); Saint-Malo, Ille-et-Vilaine, France
- Education: École normale supérieure Pierre and Marie Curie University
- Known for: Mathematical biology Chemotaxis
- Awards: Bellman Prize ``Best paper in Mathematical Biosciences" (2008–2009); CNRS Bronze Medal (2014); EMS Prize (2016)
- Scientific career
- Fields: Mathematics
- Workplaces: École Normale Supérieure de Lyon; Claude Bernard University Lyon 1
- Thesis: Mathematical models and analysis for the collective motion of cells (2007)
- Doctoral advisor: Benoit Perthame

Vincent Calvez (born 24 August 1981) is a French mathematician. He is currently a directeur de recherche (senior researcher) at the Institute Camille Jordan at the Claude Bernard University Lyon 1. He is known for his work in mathematical modeling in biology, especially in the movement of bacteria.

== Biography ==
Born in Saint-Malo, he attended lycee in Brest, he eventually gained admission to and attended École normale supérieure (Paris).

He obtained his agrégation in 2005 and did his thesis in mathematics under Bernoit Perthame at the University of Paris 6, finishing in 2007. In 2008, he took a position as a chargé de recherche at the École normale supérieure de Lyon in the Unité de mathématiques pures et appliquées (UMPA) in 2008. He defended his habilitation in 2015 and obtained the position of Directeur de Recherche at Claude Bernard University Lyon 1 in 2016.

Since 2014, he has been an associate editor of the Journal of Mathematical Biology, and, since 2018, he has been an associate editor of the SIAM Journal of Mathematical Analysis.

Aside from research, Calvez is also involved in the popularization of mathematics by coordinating the travelling exhibition “Mathàlyon,” intended for junior high and high school students.

== Research ==
Calvez's early research involved the development of models for the collective movements of bacteria via chemotaxis using kinetic models. This model describes both the individual movements of bacteria and the transport of colonies as a whole, and satisfactorily explains the specific characters of this movement. Later, he worked in collaboration with biophysicists to find a new explanation for cell polarization and in collaboration with ecologists on models for invasion fronts.

== Bibliography ==
- Calvez, V.; Lenuzza, N.; Oelz, D.; Deslys, J.-P.; Laurent, P.; Mouthon, F.; Perthame, B. "Size distribution dependence of prion aggregates infectivity". Math. Biosci. 217 (2009), no. 1, 88–99. doi:10.1016/j.mbs.2008.10.007
- Calvez, V.; Corrias, L. "The parabolic-parabolic Keller-Segel model in $\mathbb{R}^2$". Commun. Math. Sci. 6 (2008), no. 2, 417–447.
- Blanchet, A.; Calvez, V.; Carrillo, J.A.. "Convergence of the mass-transport steepest descent scheme for the subcritical Patlak–Keller–Segel model." SIAM J. Numer. Anal. 46 (2008), no. 2, 691–721. doi:10.1137/070683337
- Calvez, V.; Carrillo, J.A. "Volume effects in the Keller–Segel model: energy estimates preventing blow-up." J. Math. Pures Appl. (9) 86 (2006), no. 2, 155–175. doi:10.1016/j.matpur.2006.04.002
