= Boyan Jovanovic =

Serbian economist (born 1951)

- Born: Belgrade, Serbia

Academic background
- Education: University of Chicago; London School of Economics
- Doctoral advisor: Robert Lucas Jr.

Academic work
- Discipline: Industrial Organization
- Institutions: New York University
- Website: Information at IDEAS / RePEc

Boyan Jovanovic is a professor of economics at New York University and a long-term consultant at the Federal Reserve Bank of Richmond.

== Biography ==
Jovanovic, of Serbian descent, received his Bachelor's and master's degrees from the London School of Economics and his Ph.D. in economics from the University of Chicago.

Boyan Jovanovic is a Fellow of the American Academy of Arts and Sciences since 2003 the Econometric Society since 1989, and an Economic Theory fellow since 2012 He has won the 2019 Global Award for Entrepreneurship Research.

== See also ==
- Mean-field game theory
