= Cauchy–Kovalevskaya theorem =

Existence and uniqueness theorem for certain partial differential equations

In mathematics, the Cauchy–Kovalevskaya theorem (also written as the Cauchy–Kowalevski theorem) is the main local existence and uniqueness theorem for analytic partial differential equations associated with Cauchy initial value problems. A special case was proven by Augustin Cauchy (1842), and the full result by Sofya Kovalevskaya (1874).

== First order Cauchy–Kovalevskaya theorem ==
This theorem is about the existence of solutions to a system of m differential equations in n dimensions when the coefficients are analytic functions. The theorem and its proof are valid for analytic functions of either real or complex variables.

Let K denote the field of real or of complex numbers, and let V = K^{m} and W = K^{n}. Let A_{1}, ..., A_{n−1} be analytic functions defined on some neighbourhood of (0, 0) in W × V and taking values in the m × m matrices, and let b be an analytic function with values in V defined on the same neighbourhood. Then there is a neighbourhood of 0 in W on which the quasilinear Cauchy problem

$$\partial_{x_n}f = A_1(x,f) \partial_{x_1} f + \cdots + A_{n-1}(x,f)\partial_{x_{n-1}}f + b(x,f)$$

with initial condition

$$f(x) = 0$$

on the hypersurface

$$x_n = 0$$

has a unique analytic solution ƒ : W → V near 0.

Lewy's example shows that the theorem is not more generally valid for all smooth functions.

The theorem can also be stated in abstract (real or complex) vector spaces. Let V and W be finite-dimensional real or complex vector spaces, with n = dim W. Let A_{1}, ..., A_{n−1} be analytic functions with values in End (V) and b an analytic function with values in V, defined on some neighbourhood of (0, 0) in W × V. In this case, the same result holds.

== Proof by analytic majorization ==
Both sides of the partial differential equation can be expanded as formal power series and give recurrence relations for the coefficients of the formal power series for f that uniquely determine the coefficients. The Taylor series coefficients of the A_{i}'s and b are majorized in matrix and vector norm by a simple scalar rational analytic function. The corresponding scalar Cauchy problem involving this function instead of the A_{i}'s and b has an explicit local analytic solution. The absolute values of its coefficients majorize the norms of those of the original problem; so the formal power series solution must converge where the scalar solution converges.

== Higher-order Cauchy–Kovalevskaya theorem ==
If F and f_{j} are analytic functions near 0, then the non-linear Cauchy problem

$$\partial_t^k h = F\left(x,t,\partial_t^j\,\partial_x^\alpha h \right),\text{ where }j<k\text{ and }|\alpha|+j\le k,$$

with initial conditions

$$\partial_t^j h(x,0) = f_j(x),\qquad 0\le j<k,$$

has a unique analytic solution near 0.

This follows from the first order problem by considering the derivatives of h appearing on the right hand side as components of a vector-valued function.

=== Example ===
The heat equation

$$\partial_t h = \partial_x^2 h$$

with the condition

$$h(0,x) = {1\over 1+x^2}\text{ for }t = 0$$

has a unique formal power series solution (expanded around (0, 0)). However this formal power series does not converge for any non-zero values of t, so there are no analytic solutions in a neighborhood of the origin. This shows that the condition |α| + j ≤ k above cannot be dropped. (This example is due to Kovalevskaya.)

== Cauchy–Kovalevskaya–Kashiwara theorem ==
There is a wide generalization of the Cauchy–Kovalevskaya theorem for systems of linear partial differential equations with analytic coefficients, the Cauchy–Kovalevskaya–Kashiwara theorem, due to Masaki Kashiwara (1983). This theorem involves a cohomological formulation, presented in the language of D-modules. The existence condition involves a compatibility condition among the non homogeneous parts of each equation and the vanishing of a derived functor $Ext^1$.

=== Example ===
Let $n\le m$. Set $Y=\{ x_1=\cdots=x_n \}$. The system $\partial_{x_i} f=g_i, i=1,\ldots,n,$ has a solution $f\in \mathbb C \{ x_1,\ldots,x_m\}$ if and only if the compatibility conditions $\partial_{x_i}g_j=\partial_{x_j}g_i$ are verified. In order to have a unique solution we must include an initial condition $f|_Y=h$, where $h\in \mathbb C \{ x_{n+1},\ldots,x_m\}$.
