= Lewy's example =

Linear partial differential equation with no solutions

In the mathematical study of partial differential equations, Lewy's example is a celebrated example, due to Hans Lewy, of a linear partial differential equation with no solutions. It shows that the analog of the Cauchy–Kovalevskaya theorem does not hold in the smooth category.

The original example is not explicit, since it employs the Hahn–Banach theorem, but there since have been various explicit examples of the same nature found by Howard Jacobowitz.

The Malgrange–Ehrenpreis theorem states (roughly) that linear partial differential equations with constant coefficients always have at least one solution; Lewy's example shows that this result cannot be extended to linear partial differential equations with polynomial coefficients.

== The example ==
The statement is as follows

On $\mathbb{R} \times \mathbb{C}$, there exists a smooth (i.e., $C^\infty$) complex-valued function $F(t, z)$ such that the differential equation

$$\frac{\partial u}{\partial\bar{z}} - iz\frac{\partial u}{\partial t} = F(t, z)$$

admits no solution on any open set. Note that if $F$ is analytic, then the Cauchy–Kovalevskaya theorem implies that there exists a solution.

Lewy constructs this $F$ using the following result:

On $\mathbb{R} \times \mathbb{C}$, suppose that $u(t, z)$ is a function satisfying, in a neighborhood of the origin,

$$\frac{\partial u}{\partial\bar{z}} - iz\frac{\partial u}{\partial t} = \varphi'(t)$$

for some C^{1} function φ. Then φ must be real-analytic in a (possibly smaller) neighborhood of the origin.

This may be construed as a non-existence theorem by taking φ to be merely a smooth function. Lewy's example takes this latter equation and in a sense translates its non-solvability to every point of $\mathbb{R} \times \mathbb{C}$. The method of proof uses a Baire category argument, so in a certain precise sense almost all equations of this form are unsolvable.

Mizohata (1962) later found that the even simpler equation

$$\frac{\partial u}{\partial x} + ix\frac{\partial u}{\partial y} = F(x, y)$$

depending on 2 real variables x and y sometimes has no solutions. This is almost the simplest possible partial differential operator with non-constant coefficients.

== Significance for CR manifolds ==
A CR manifold comes equipped with a chain complex of differential operators, formally similar to the Dolbeault complex on a complex manifold, called the $\scriptstyle\bar{\partial}_b$-complex. The Dolbeault complex admits a version of the Poincaré lemma. In the language of sheaves, this means that the Dolbeault complex is exact. The Lewy example, however, shows that the $\scriptstyle\bar{\partial}_b$-complex is almost never exact.
