= Irene Fonseca =

Portuguese-American mathematician

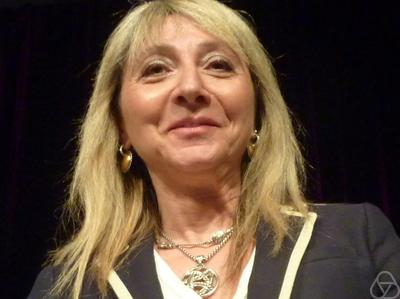
Irene Fonseca

Irene Maria Quintanilha Coelho da Fonseca is a Portuguese-American applied mathematician, the Kavčić-Moura University Professor of Mathematics at Carnegie Mellon University, where she directs the Center for Nonlinear Analysis, which is part of the Mellon College of Science's Department of Mathematical Sciences.

== Professional career ==
Fonseca was born in Portugal, and did her undergraduate studies at the University of Lisbon. She earned a Ph.D. from the University of Minnesota in 1985, under the supervision of David Kinderlehrer, who later followed his student to CMU. She joined the CMU faculty after postdoctoral studies in Paris, France.

In 2011, Fonseca was elected president of the Society for Industrial and Applied Mathematics, serving in office from 2013 to 2014. She also served on the Mathematical Sciences jury for the Infosys Prize in 2014 and 2015. Furthermore, she is currently serving as the Chair of SIAM's Activity Group on Mathematical Aspects of Materials Science, with the term lasting until December 31, 2024.

In addition, Fonseca was elected to serve as a Vice President of the American Mathematical Society for a three-year term, beginning in February 2024.

== Books ==
Fonseca is the co-author of:

- Degree Theory in Analysis and Applications (with Wilfrid Gangbo, Oxford University Press, 1995)
- Modern Methods in the Calculus of Variations: L^{P} Spaces (with Giovanni Leoni, Springer Verlag, 2007)

== Awards and honors ==
Fonseca is a knight of the Order of Saint James of the Sword. She was awarded the Kovalevsky Award and Lecture in 2006, and in 2009, Fonseca was elected as a fellow of SIAM "for contributions to nonlinear partial differential equations and the calculus of variations". In 2012 she became a fellow of the American Mathematical Society. She is also a former AMS Council member at large. In 2021, she was elected to the European Academy of Sciences (EURASC) and, in 2022, she received the Senior Prize from the International Society for the Interaction of Mechanics and Mathematics for "her outstanding contributions to the calculus of variations and the mathematics of materials science, along with her exemplary service to the mathematical community and for being an inspirational mentor and role model for female mathematicians."
