= Benoit Perthame =

French mathematician (born 1959)

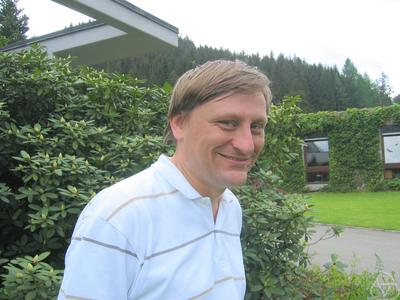
- Perthame at Oberwolfach, 2006
- Born: 23 June 1959 (age 67)
- Education: Paris Dauphine University
- Scientific career
- Fields: Mathematics
- Workplaces: Pierre-et-Marie Curie University
- Thesis: Sur quelques problèmes de contrôle optimal et de théories cinétiques et leur approximation numérique (1987)
- Doctoral advisor: Pierre-Louis Lions
- Doctoral students: Chiara Simeoni

Benoit Perthame (born 23 June 1959 in France) is a French mathematician, who deals with non-linear partial differential equations and their applications in biology. He is a professor at Pierre-et-Marie Curie University and at the Laboratoire Jacques-Louis Lions, which he directs.

== Career ==
Perthame studied at the École normale supérieure (ENS) and in 1983, he became an assistant. In 1987, under the supervision of Pierre-Louis Lions, he obtained his habilitation thesis. His thesis focuses on non-linear partial differential equations in optimal control theory, hydrodynamics and kinetic theory.

In 1988, he was professor at the University of Orléans, and since 1993, he has been professor at the University of Paris VI and the Institut universitaire de France. From 1997 to 2007, he was in the Department of Mathematics and Applications of the ENS (DMA/ENS) and simultaneously heads the Multi-model and Numerical Methods Project (M3N) of the Institut national de recherche en informatique et en automatique (INRIA). Since 1989, he has been the scientific advisor to this organization and since 1998 has headed the BANG Group (Numerical Analysis of Non-linear Models for Biology and Geophysics).

His research interests include mathematical modeling of chemotaxis and movement and self-organization of cells and bacteria, neural networks, tumor growth and chemotherapy, population growth and evolution.

== Publications ==
- Perthame, B. (2007). Transport equations in biology. Basel: Birkhäuser. ISBN 978-3-7643-7842-4. OCLC 184984556.
- Charpentier, Éric; Nikolski, Nikolaï Kapitonovitch; École doctorale de Mathématiques et Informatique (2007). Leçons de mathématiques d'aujourd'hui. Volume 3 (in French). Paris: Cassini. ISBN 978-2-84225-082-9. OCLC 494036904.

== Awards and honours ==
He was a guest speaker at the International Congress of Mathematicians in 1994 in Zurich with a conference lecture entitled Kinetic Equations and Hyperbolic Systems of Conservation Laws and was selected to give a plenary lecture at the ICM 2014 in Seoul (Some aspects of mathematical tumor growth and therapy).

In 1989/90, he received the Peccot Prize at the Collège de France, in 1992 the CISI Prize, in 1994 the CNRS Silver Medal and in 1992 the Blaise-Pascal Prize from the French Academy of Sciences. From 1994 to 1999, he was a junior member and then in 2006, a senior member at the Institut universitaire de France. In 2013, he received the Blaise-Pascal medal (de) and in 2015 the Inria Prize from the Academy of Sciences. In 2016, he was elected a member of Academia Europaea. At the end of 2017, he was elected a member of the French Academy of Sciences.

Among his doctoral students is Vincent Calvez.
