= Carathéodory function =

In mathematical analysis, a Carathéodory function (or Carathéodory integrand) is a multivariable function that allows us to solve the following problem effectively: A composition of two Lebesgue-measurable functions does not have to be Lebesgue-measurable as well. Nevertheless, a composition of a measurable function with a continuous function is indeed Lebesgue-measurable, but in many situations, continuity is a too restrictive assumption. Carathéodory functions are more general than continuous functions, but still allow a composition with Lebesgue-measurable function to be measurable. Carathéodory functions play a significant role in calculus of variation, and it is named after the Greek mathematician Constantin Carathéodory.

== Definition ==
$W:\Omega\times\mathbb{R}^{N}\rightarrow\mathbb{R}\cup\left\{ +\infty\right\}$, for $\Omega\subseteq\mathbb{R}^{d}$ endowed with the Lebesgue measure, is a Carathéodory function if:

1. The mapping $x\mapsto W\left(x,\xi\right)$ is Lebesgue-measurable for every $\xi\in\mathbb{R}^{N}$.

2. the mapping $\xi\mapsto W\left(x,\xi\right)$ is continuous for almost every $x\in\Omega$.

The main merit of Carathéodory function is the following: If $W:\Omega\times\mathbb{R}^{N}\rightarrow\mathbb{R}$ is a Carathéodory function and $u:\Omega\rightarrow\mathbb{R}^{N}$ is Lebesgue-measurable, then the composition $x\mapsto W\left(x,u\left(x\right)\right)$ is Lebesgue-measurable.

== Example ==
Many problems in the calculus of variation are formulated in the following way: find the minimizer of the functional $\mathcal{F}:W^{1,p}\left(\Omega;\mathbb{R}^{m}\right)\rightarrow\mathbb{R}\cup\left\{ +\infty\right\}$ where $W^{1,p}\left(\Omega;\mathbb{R}^{m}\right)$ is the Sobolev space, the space consisting of all function $u:\Omega\rightarrow\mathbb{R}^{m}$ that are weakly differentiable and that the function itself and all its first order derivative are in $L^{p}\left(\Omega;\mathbb{R}^{m}\right)$; and where $\mathcal{F}\left[u\right]=\int_{\Omega}W\left(x,u\left(x\right),\nabla u\left(x\right)\right)dx$ for some $W:\Omega\times\mathbb{R}^{m}\times\mathbb{R}^{d\times m}\rightarrow\mathbb{R}$, a Carathéodory function. The fact that $W$ is a Carathéodory function ensures us that $\mathcal{F}\left[u\right]=\int_{\Omega}W\left(x,u\left(x\right),\nabla u\left(x\right)\right)dx$ is well-defined.

== p-growth ==
If $W:\Omega\times\mathbb{R}^{m}\times\mathbb{R}^{d\times m}\rightarrow\mathbb{R}$ is Carathéodory and satisfies $\left|W\left(x,v,A\right)\right|\leq C\left(1+\left|v\right|^{p}+\left|A\right|^{p}\right)$ for some $C>0$ (this condition is called "p-growth"), then $\mathcal{F}:W^{1,p}\left(\Omega;\mathbb{R}^{m}\right)\rightarrow\mathbb{R}$ where $\mathcal{F}\left[u\right]=\int_{\Omega}W\left(x,u\left(x\right),\nabla u\left(x\right)\right)dx$ is finite, and continuous in the strong topology (i.e. in the norm) of $W^{1,p}\left(\Omega;\mathbb{R}^{m}\right)$.
