= Miklós Rédei =

Hungarian philosopher, logician and physicist

Miklós Rédei (born October 4, 1952, in Budapest, Hungary) is a Hungarian philosopher who specializes in the philosophy of physics. He is professor of philosophy at the Department of Philosophy, Logic and Scientific Method at the London School of Economics.

Rédei holds an MA in physics and MA in philosophy from Eötvös Loránd University, and a PhD in philosophy from the same university from 1982. He was awarded his doctorate (Candidate of Sciences) in physics in 1989, his habilitation in philosophy in 1997, and became Doctor of Sciences in philosophy in 2001. He has been an assistant professor at Eötvös Loránd University, Fulbright Scholar at the University of Pittsburgh, University of California, Irvine, senior fellow at the Dibner Institute for the History of Science and Technology at the Massachusetts Institute of Technology, and visiting fellow at the Munich Centre for Mathematical Philosophy at LMU Munich.

Rédei has published extensively on the logical foundations of quantum mechanics, probabilistic causation, mathematical physics, the history of mathematics, as well as the life and works of John von Neumann.

== Books ==
Rédei is the author or coauthor of:

- Quantum Logic in Algebraic Approach (Kluwer, 1998).
- The Principle of the Common Cause (with Gábor Hofer-Szabó and László E. Szabó, Cambridge University Press, 2013).

His edited volumes include:

- John von Neumann and the Foundations of Physics (edited with Michael Stölzner, Kluwer, 2001)
- John von Neumann: Selected Letters (American Mathematical Society, 2005).
- The Vienna Circle in Hungary (edited with András Máté and Friedrich Stadler, Springer, 2011)
