= Marina von Neumann Whitman =

American economist (1935–2025)

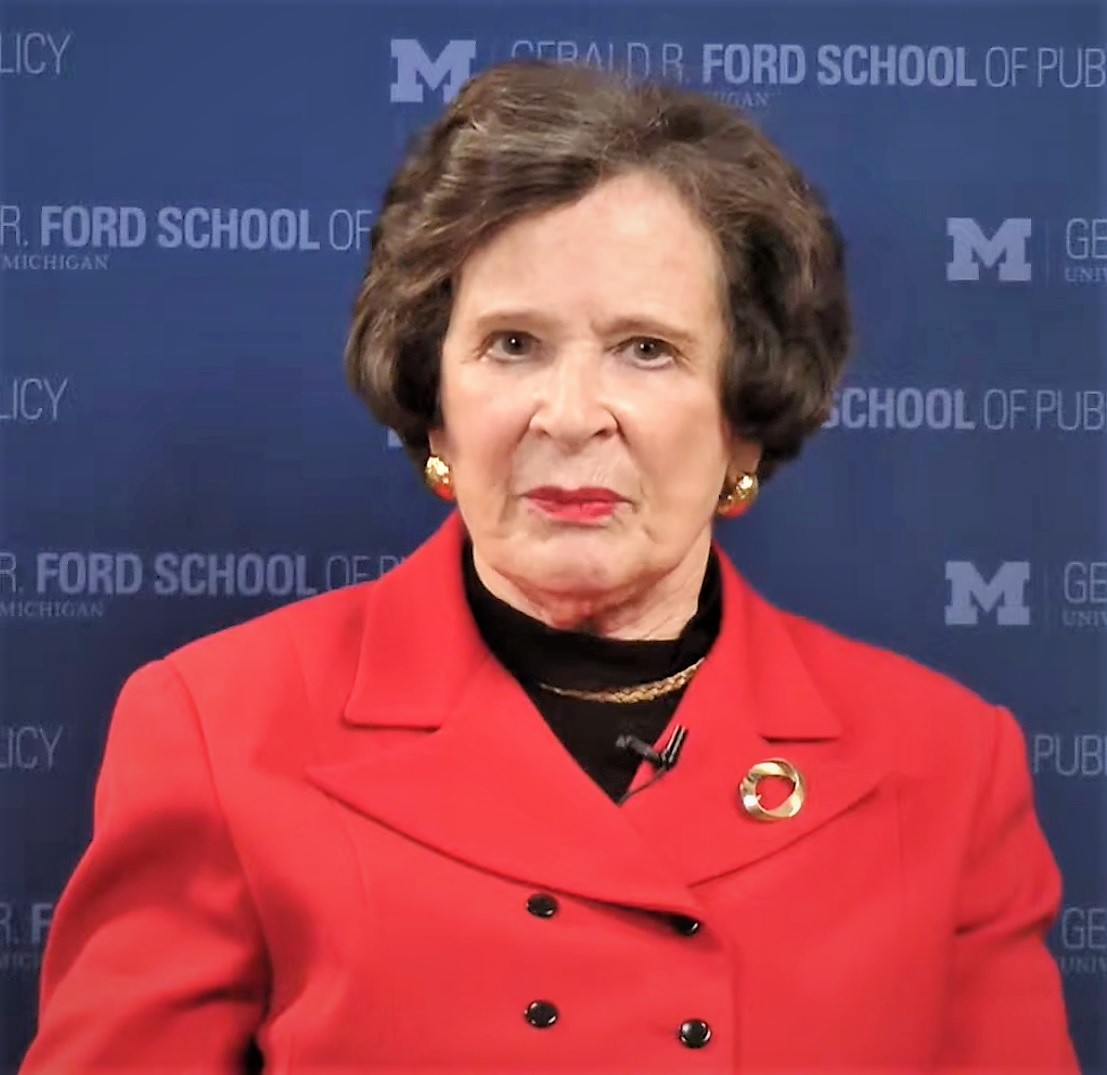
- Whitman in 2015
- Born: Marina von Neumann; March 6, 1935; New York City, U.S.
- Died: May 20, 2025 (aged 90); Concord, Massachusetts, U.S.
- Education: Radcliffe College (BA); Columbia University (MA); Columbia University (PhD)
- Occupations: Economist; automobile executive; writer
- Employer: University of Michigan
- Board member of: National Bureau of Economic Research; Institute for International Economics; Institute for Advanced Study; Alcoa; Chase Manhattan Corporation and Bank; Procter and Gamble; Unocal
- Spouse: Robert Freeman Whitman (m. 1956; died 2024)
- Children: 2
- Parents: John von Neumann; Marietta von Neumann

Marina von Neumann Whitman (March 6, 1935 – May 20, 2025) was an American economist, writer and automobile executive. She was a professor of business administration and public policy at the Ross School of Business and the Ford School of Public Policy at the University of Michigan.

== Early life ==
Marina von Neumann was born in New York City on March 6, 1935. Her father was polymath John von Neumann.

Marina von Neumann earned a bachelor's degree in government from Radcliffe College (now Harvard University) in 1956, graduating at the top of her class, and her master's degree and doctorate degree in economics from Columbia University in 1959 and 1962 respectively.

== Career ==
Whitman was a member of the faculty in the Department of Economics at the University of Pittsburgh, beginning as an instructor in 1962 and becoming Distinguished Public Service Professor of Economics in 1973. She served as a member of the President's Council of Economic Advisers in 1972–73, while on leave from the university. She was a director at the Council on Foreign Relations between 1977 and 1987. She was also a onetime member of the Steering Committee of the Bilderberg Group.

From 1979 until 1992, she was an officer of the General Motors Corporation, first as vice president and chief economist, and later as vice president and group executive for public affairs, which included the Economics, Environmental Activities, Industry-Government Relations and Public Relations staffs. She also served as a director of several leading multinational corporations and research and policy institutions, including the Institute for Advanced Study and Peterson Institute for International Economics.

The author of many books, monographs and articles, she was the recipient of numerous fellowships, honors and awards, and holds honorary degrees from over twenty colleges and universities.

== Personal life and death ==
She was married to Robert Freeman Whitman, professor of English at the University of Pittsburgh, from June 23, 1956, until his death in 2024. Whitman had two children and two grandchildren.

Whitman died from pneumonia at a hospital in Concord, Massachusetts, on May 20, 2025, at the age of 90.

== Published books ==
- The Martian's Daughter. A Memoir. Ann Arbor, MI: The University of Michigan Press. 2012 – via Internet Archive.
- New World, New Rules: The Changing Role of the American Corporation, Harvard Business School Press, 1999
- Reflections of Interdependence: Issues for Economic Theory and U.S. Policy, University of Pittsburgh Press, 1979.
- Government Risk-Sharing in Foreign Investment, Princeton University Press, 1965
