= Peter Duren =

American mathematician (1935–2020)

- Born: Peter Larkin Duren; April 30, 1935; New Orleans, Louisiana, U.S.
- Died: July 10, 2020 (aged 85)
- Education: Harvard University (BA); Massachusetts Institute of Technology (PhD)
- Awards: American Mathematical Society (2012)
- Scientific career
- Fields: Mathematical analysis
- Workplaces: Institute for Advanced Study; Technion – Israel Institute of Technology; Stanford University; University of Michigan
- Thesis: Spectral theory of a class of non-self-adjoint infinite matrix operators (1960)
- Doctoral advisor: Gian-Carlo Rota
- Notable students: Ted Kaczynski

Peter Larkin Duren (April 30, 1935 – July 10, 2020) was an American mathematician. He specialized in mathematical analysis and was known for the monographs and textbooks he has written.

== Academic career ==
Duren received in 1956 his bachelor's degree from Harvard University and in 1960 his Ph.D. from the Massachusetts Institute of Technology (MIT) under Gian-Carlo Rota with thesis Spectral theory of a class of non-self-adjoint infinite matrix operators. As a postdoc he was an instructor at Stanford University. At the University of Michigan, he became in 1962 an assistant professor, in 1966 an associate professor, in 1969 a professor, and in 2010 a professor emeritus. As a professor, Duren served on the thesis committee of Ted Kaczynski.

Duren was in 1968/69 at the Institute for Advanced Study, in 1975 a visiting professor at the Technion in Haifa, in 1964/65 a visiting scientist at Imperial College and the University of Paris-Sud in Orsay, in 1982 a visiting professor at the University of Maryland and in 1982/83 at the Mittag-Leffler Institute, the University of Paris-Sud and at the ETH Zürich. In 1989 he was a visiting scientist at Stanford University, in 1993 at the University of Hawaii and in 1996 at the Norwegian Institute of Technology in Trondheim. He has also been a visiting scientist in Halle, at the Max-Planck Institute in Leipzig, at the University of Witwatersrand, in Santiago de Chile, at the Autonomous University of Madrid, at Bar-Ilan University and the Academia Sinica in Beijing.

In 1976/77 he was chief editor of the Michigan Mathematical Journal. He was a co-editor of the American Mathematical Monthly and a festschrift for Frederick Gehring.

Duren's research and expository writing deals with function theory and functional analysis, including Hardy spaces, schlicht functions, harmonic analysis, geometric function theory, potential theory, and special functions.

Duren died on July 10, 2020, at the age of 85.

== Awards ==
From 1964 to 1966, Duren was a Sloan Fellow. In 2012, he became a Fellow of the American Mathematical Society.

== Selected works ==
- 1970: Theory of $H^p$-Spaces, Academic Press, Dover 2000
- 1983: Univalent Functions, Grundlehren der mathematischen Wissenschaften, Springer Verlag
- 1988: (as editor with Richard A. Askey and Uta C. Merzbach) A Century of Mathematics in America, 3 vols., American Mathematical Society (Centenary of the AMS)
- 2004: Harmonic Maps in the Plane, Cambridge University Press
- 2004: (with Alexander Schuster) Bergman Spaces, American Mathematical Society
- 2012: Invitation to Classical Analysis, American Mathematical Society
