= Rota's basis conjecture =

Conjecture in linear algebra

In linear algebra and matroid theory, Rota's basis conjecture is an unproven conjecture concerning rearrangements of bases, named after Gian-Carlo Rota. It states that, if X is either a vector space of dimension n or more generally a matroid of rank n, with n disjoint bases B_{i}, then it is possible to arrange the elements of these bases into an n × n matrix in such a way that the rows of the matrix are exactly the given bases and the columns of the matrix are also bases. That is, it should be possible to find a second set of n disjoint bases C_{i}, each of which consists of one element from each of the bases B_{i}.

== Examples ==
The nine vertices of three colored triangles (red, blue, and yellow) regrouped into three rainbow triangles (black edges)

Rota's basis conjecture has a simple formulation for points in the Euclidean plane: it states that, given three triangles with distinct vertices, with each triangle colored with one of three colors, it must be possible to regroup the nine triangle vertices into three "rainbow" triangles having one vertex of each color. The triangles are all required to be non-degenerate, meaning that they do not have all three vertices on a line.

To see this as an instance of the basis conjecture, one may use either linear independence of the vectors ($x_{i},y_{i},1$) in a three-dimensional real vector space (where ($x_{i},y_{i}$) are the Cartesian coordinates of the triangle vertices) or equivalently one may use a matroid of rank three in which a set S of points is independent if either |S| ≤ 2 or S forms the three vertices of a non-degenerate triangle. For this linear algebra and this matroid, the bases are exactly the non-degenerate triangles. Given the three input triangles and the three rainbow triangles, it is possible to arrange the nine vertices into a 3 × 3 matrix in which each row contains the vertices of one of the single-color triangles and each column contains the vertices of one of the rainbow triangles.s

Analogously, for points in three-dimensional Euclidean space, the conjecture states that the sixteen vertices of four non-degenerate tetrahedra of four different colors may be regrouped into four rainbow tetrahedra.

== Partial results ==
The statement of Rota's basis conjecture was first published by Huang & Rota (1994), crediting it (without citation) to Rota in 1989. The basis conjecture has been proven for paving matroids (for all n) and for the case n ≤ 3 (for all types of matroid). For arbitrary matroids, it is possible to arrange the basis elements into a matrix the first Ω(√n) columns of which are bases. The basis conjecture for linear algebras over fields of characteristic zero and for even values of n would follow from another conjecture on Latin squares by Alon and Tarsi. Based on this implication, the conjecture is known to be true for linear algebras over the real numbers for infinitely many values of n.

== Related problems ==
In connection with Tverberg's theorem, Bárány & Larman (1992) conjectured that, for every set of r (d + 1) points in d-dimensional Euclidean space, colored with d + 1 colors in such a way that there are r points of each color, there is a way to partition the points into rainbow simplices (sets of d + 1 points with one point of each color) in such a way that the convex hulls of these sets have a nonempty intersection. For instance, the two-dimensional case (proven by Bárány and Larman) with r = 3 states that, for every set of nine points in the plane, colored with three colors and three points of each color, it is possible to partition the points into three intersecting rainbow triangles, a statement similar to Rota's basis conjecture which states that it is possible to partition the points into three non-degenerate rainbow triangles. The conjecture of Bárány and Larman allows a collinear triple of points to be considered as a rainbow triangle, whereas Rota's basis conjecture disallows this; on the other hand, Rota's basis conjecture does not require the triangles to have a common intersection. Substantial progress on the conjecture of Bárány and Larman was made by Blagojević, Matschke & Ziegler (2009).

== See also ==
- Rota's conjecture, a different conjecture by Rota about linear algebra and matroids
