= Annals of Combinatorics =

- Discipline: Mathematics
- Language: English
- Edited by: Frédérique Bassino, Kolja Knauer, Matjaž Konvalinka

Publication details
- History: 1997–present
- Publisher: Birkhäuser
- Frequency: Quarterly
- Impact factor: 0.5 (2022)

Standard abbreviations
- ISO 4: Ann. Comb.
- MathSciNet: Ann. Comb.

Indexing
- ISSN: 0218-0006 (print); 0219-3094 (web)
- LCCN: sn97023285
- OCLC no.: 1229621116

Links
- Journal homepage; Online archive

Annals of Combinatorics is a quarterly peer-reviewed scientific journal covering research in combinatorics. It was established in 1997 by William Chen and is published by Birkhäuser.

The journal publishes articles in combinatorics and related areas with a focus on algebraic combinatorics, analytic combinatorics, graph theory, and matroid theory.

Until December 2019, the journal was edited by George Andrews, William Chen, and Peter Paule. The current editors-in-chief are Frédérique Bassino, Kolja Knauer, and Matjaž Konvalinka.

== Abstracting and indexing ==
The journal is abstracted and indexed in

- MathSciNet,
- Science Citation Index Expanded,
- Scopus, and
- ZbMATH Open.

According to the Journal Citation Reports, the journal has a 2022 impact factor of 0.5.
