= William Y.C. Chen =

Chinese mathematician

William Yong-Chuan "Bill" Chen is a Chinese politician and applied mathematician.

Chen was born in March 1964 in Nanchong, Sichuan Province. He graduated from the College of Computer Science of Sichuan University in 1984 and from its College of Mathematics in 1987, then taught briefly at the Southwestern University of Finance and Economics before going to MIT on the recommendation of Shiing-Shen Chern to study combinatorics under Rota. In 1991 he received the J. Robert Oppenheimer Postdoctoral Fellowship at Los Alamos. His honors include the National Science Fund for Distinguished Young Scholars (1995), the UNESCO Javed Husain Young Scientist Award (1997), and the Chern Mathematics Award of the Chinese Mathematical Society (2011). He is a member of the Chinese Academy of Sciences.

He received his doctorate from the Massachusetts Institute of Technology in 1991, under the direction of Gian-Carlo Rota.

Between 1991 and 1996, Chen was a research fellow at Los Alamos National Laboratory, working with James D. Louck. In 1996 he returned to China, founding the Center for Combinatorics at Nankai University. He also founded Annals of Combinatorics, a scientific journal published by Birkhäuser. He is on the editorial board of Advances in Applied Mathematics.
