= Jenny McNulty =

American mathematician and academic administrator

Jennifer McNulty is an American mathematician and academic administrator, the dean of the College of Arts and Sciences at the University of Alaska Anchorage. Her research is in combinatorics, specializing in matroid theory and graph theory.

== Education and career ==
McNulty majored in both chemistry and mathematics at Providence College, a Catholic university in Rhode Island, graduating in 1985. After earning a master's degree in mathematics at Stony Brook University, she completed her Ph.D. in 1993 at the University of North Carolina at Chapel Hill. Her dissertation, Affine Hyperplane Arrangements and Oriented Matroids, was supervised by Thomas H. Brylawski.

She joined the University of Montana as an assistant professor in 1993, earned tenure there in 1997, and was promoted to full professor in 2004. She was chair of the Pacific Northwest Section of the Mathematical Association of America from 1998 to 2002. She became associate dean of the School of Humanities and Sciences at the University of Montana in 2010, and acting dean in 2018. Also in 2018, she traveled to the University of Gondar in Ethiopia as a Fulbright Scholar, working with mathematicians there on curriculum design, mentoring a new group of female faculty with little prior teaching experience that the university had recently hired, and building connections between the University of Gondar and University of Montana.

In 2020 she moved from the University of Montana to an affiliated university, the University of Montana Western, as interim provost and vice chancellor of academic and student affairs. She moved to the University of Alaska Anchorage as dean of the College of Arts and Sciences in 2021.

== Book ==
With Gary Gordon of Lafayette College, McNulty is the author of the book Matroids: a Geometric Introduction (Cambridge University Press, 2012).
