= Thomas H. Brylawski =

American mathematician

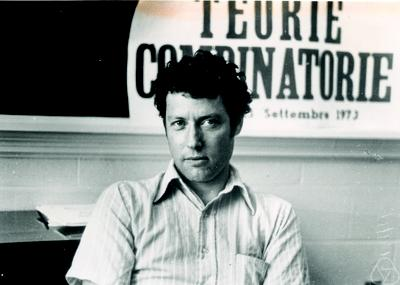
- Tom Brylawski (from the Oberwolfach Photo Collection)
- Born: Thomas Henry Brylawski; June 17, 1944; Washington, D.C., U.S.
- Died: July 18, 2007 (aged 63); Hillsborough, North Carolina, U.S.
- Other name: Tom Brylawski
- Education: Massachusetts Institute of Technology (BS); Dartmouth College (PhD)
- Known for: Matroid theory
- Scientific career
- Fields: Mathematics
- Workplaces: University of North Carolina, Chapel Hill
- Thesis: The Tutte–Grothendieck Ring (1970)
- Doctoral advisors: Gian-Carlo Rota; Robert Norman
- Doctoral students: Jenny McNulty

Thomas Henry Brylawski (June 17, 1944 – July 18, 2007) was an American mathematician and professor at the University of North Carolina, Chapel Hill. He worked primarily in matroid theory.

== Education and career ==
Brylawski was born in 1944, and grew up in Washington, D.C. He attended the Massachusetts Institute of Technology for his undergraduate degree, finishing with a Bachelor of Science in 1966. He then went on to Dartmouth College for his graduate work. He completed his PhD under the direction of Gian-Carlo Rota and Robert Norman in 1970. After his PhD, he moved to the University of North Carolina, Chapel Hill, where he spent the rest of his career.

Brylawski was an editor for the Proceedings of the American Mathematical Society from 1977 until 1989. Brylawski wrote 40 mathematical publications, and advised 6 PhD students.

He died in 2007 of esophageal cancer at the Duke Hospice inpatient facility in Hillsborough, North Carolina.

== Work ==
Brylawski's early work used ideas and tools from category theory to understand the Tutte polynomial of a matroid. Indeed, this idea already appeared in his thesis, which made constructions in matroid theory similar to the Grothendieck group. He developed similar ideas in two papers in the Transactions of the American Mathematical Society. Another influential early paper of Brylawski's, published in the same journal, described the influence of a modular element in the lattice of flats on the characteristic polynomial of a matroid.

Brylawski also contributed expository chapters to several matroid theory books that appeared in the Encyclopedia of Mathematics and its Applications series published by Cambridge University Press. The Tutte polynomial chapter (written jointly with James Oxley) has around 500 citations.

In addition to his work in matroid theory, Brylawski also had an interest in mathematics in art, particularly in the role of symmetry in art. He gave lectures on mathematics in art on two occasions at the National Gallery of Art in Washington, D.C.

== Awards and honors ==
A memorial conference was held in honor of Brylawski in October 2008 at the University of North Carolina, Chapel Hill, and a special issue of the European Journal of Combinatorics in 2011 was dedicated as a tribute to the work of Brylawski.
