= Henry Crapo (mathematician) =

American-Canadian mathematician (1932–2019)

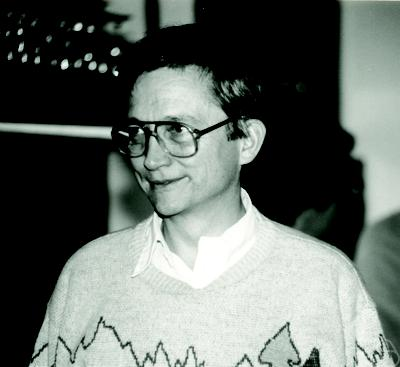
- Henry Crapo at Oberwolfach in 1987
- Pronunciation: KRAY-poh
- Born: Henry Howland Crapo; August 12, 1932; Detroit, Michigan, United States
- Died: September 3, 2019 (aged 87); La Vacquerie-et-Saint-Martin-de-Castries, France
- Citizenship: American, Canadian
- Education: Massachusetts Institute of Technology (Ph.D.)
- Known for: Matroid theory
- Scientific career
- Fields: Mathematics
- Thesis: On the Theory of Combinatorial Independence (1964)
- Doctoral advisors: Gian-Carlo Rota, Kenneth Hoffman

Henry Howland Crapo (KRAY-poh; August 12, 1932 – September 3, 2019) was an American-Canadian mathematician who worked in algebraic combinatorics. Over the course of his career, he held positions at several universities and research institutes in Canada and France. He is noted for his work in matroid theory and lattice theory.

== Education and career ==
Crapo was born in Detroit, Michigan, in 1932. He received his Ph.D. in 1964 under the supervision of Gian-Carlo Rota and Kenneth Hoffman, with thesis On the theory of combinatorial independence. While working on his thesis, he was an assistant professor at Northeastern University in Boston. He subsequently held academic positions at the University of Waterloo, Université de Montréal, INRIA Rocquencourt, and École des Hautes Études en Sciences Sociales. During his time in Waterloo, Crapo became a Canadian citizen.

Crapo is known for his early work in matroid theory, and for related work in lattice theory. He introduced the beta invariant of a matroid, and published the first paper on the Tutte polynomial (though Tutte had already defined an equivalent polynomial in his thesis). Together with Gian-Carlo Rota, Crapo wrote the first book on matroid theory. He is also known for Crapo's Complementation Theorem in poset Möbius Inversion. Crapo wrote 65 mathematical publications during his career.

Upon his retirement, Crapo moved to the south of France. He continued some mathematical activity, and hosted several small conferences at his house there. He died on September 3, 2019.

== Awards and honors ==
- A special 1999 issue of the journal Advances in Applied Mathematics was dedicated to Crapo on the occasion of his 67th birthday.

== Personal life ==
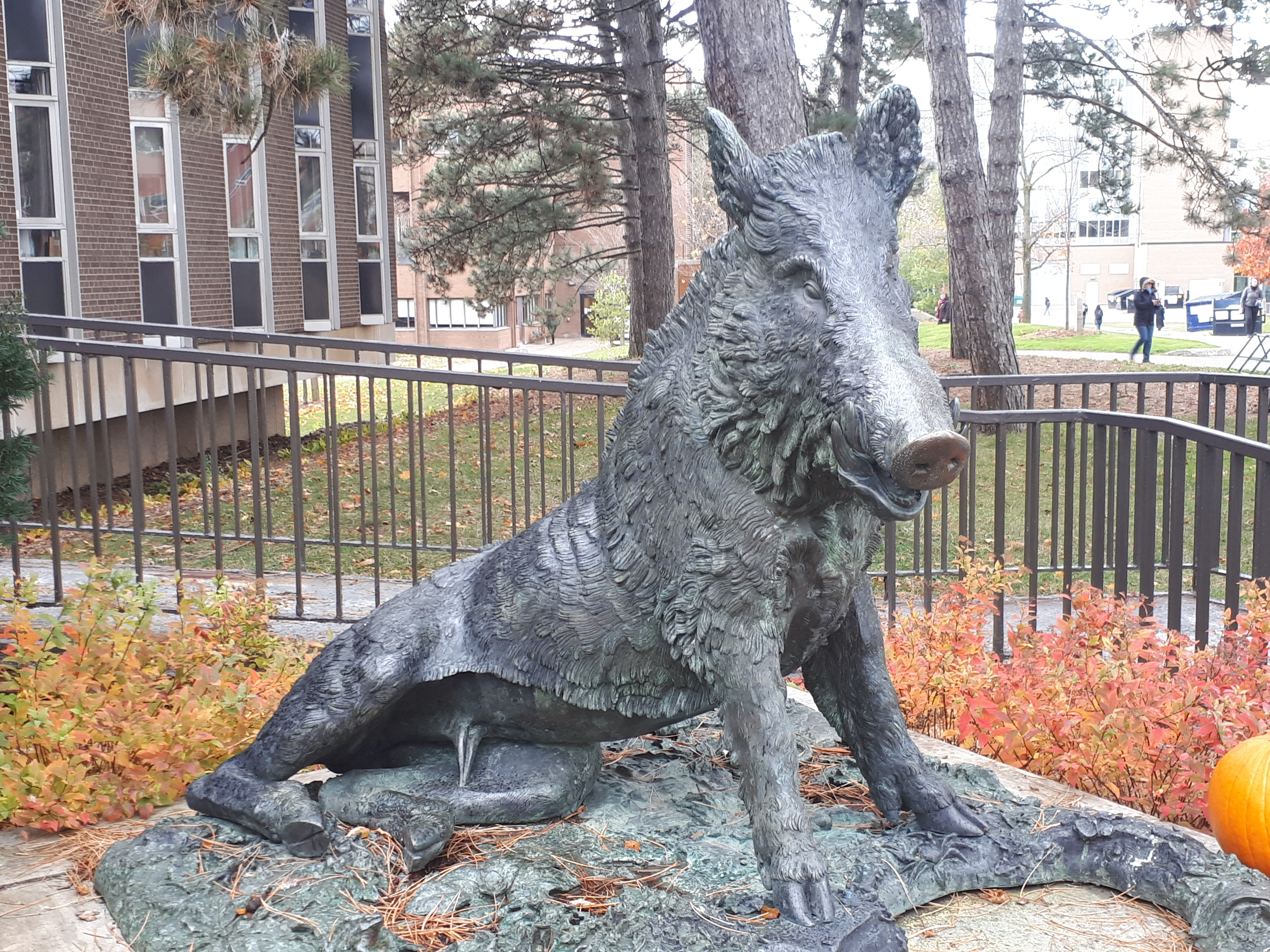
The University of Waterloo Porcellino, donated by Crapo

Crapo was a patron of the arts. At the University of Waterloo he donated a collection of rare books on the history of dance and ballet, as well as a copy of the Porcellino sculpture of Florence; the latter shoulder-high bronze sculpture of a wild boar later became a mascot for the University of Waterloo Faculty of Arts. He also donated The Temptation of St. Anthony by James Ensor to the Royal Museum of Fine Arts in Antwerp and Corpse of Man by Hyman Bloom to the Rose Art Museum at Brandeis University.
