= Gian-Carlo Rota =

Italian-American mathematician (1932–1999)

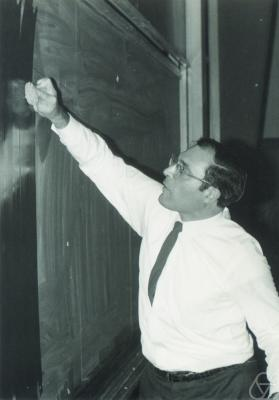
- Rota in 1970
- Born: April 27, 1932; Vigevano, Italy
- Died: April 18, 1999 (aged 66); Cambridge, Massachusetts, U.S.
- Education: Princeton University (AB); Yale University (PhD)
- Awards: Leroy P. Steele Prize (1988)
- Scientific career
- Fields: Combinatorics; Functional analysis; Probability theory; Phenomenology
- Workplaces: Massachusetts Institute of Technology; Los Alamos National Laboratory; The Rockefeller University
- Doctoral advisor: Jacob T. Schwartz
- Notable students: Thomas H. Brylawski; William Y.C. Chen; Daniel I. A. Cohen; Henry Crapo; Peter Duren; Richard Ehrenborg; Stephen Grossberg; Mark Haiman; Patrick O'Neil; Richard P. Stanley; Walter Whiteley; Catherine Yan

Gian-Carlo Rota (April 27, 1932 – April 18, 1999) was an Italian-American mathematician and philosopher. He spent most of his career at the Massachusetts Institute of Technology, where he worked in combinatorics, functional analysis, probability theory, and phenomenology.

== Early life and education ==
Rota was born in Vigevano, Italy. His father, Giovanni, an architect and prominent antifascist, was the brother of the mathematician Rosetta, who was the wife of the writer Ennio Flaiano. Gian-Carlo's family left Italy when he was 13 years old, initially going to Switzerland.

Rota attended the Colegio Americano de Quito in Ecuador, and graduated with an A.B. in mathematics from Princeton University in 1953 after completing a senior thesis, titled "On the solubility of linear equations in topological vector spaces", under the supervision of William Feller. He then pursued graduate studies at Yale University, where he received a Ph.D. in mathematics in 1956 after completing a doctoral dissertation, titled "Extension Theory Of Ordinary Linear Differential Operators", under the supervision of Jacob T. Schwartz.

== Career ==
Much of Rota's career was spent as a professor at the Massachusetts Institute of Technology (MIT), where he was and remains the only person ever to be appointed Professor of Applied Mathematics and Philosophy. Rota was also the Norbert Wiener Professor of Applied Mathematics.

In addition to his professorships at MIT, Rota held four honorary degrees, from the University of Strasbourg, France (1984); the University of L'Aquila, Italy (1990); the University of Bologna, Italy (1996); and Brooklyn Polytechnic University (1997). Beginning in 1966 he was a consultant at Los Alamos National Laboratory, frequently visiting to lecture, discuss, and collaborate, notably with his friend Stanisław Ulam. He was also a consultant for the Rand Corporation (1966–71) and for the Brookhaven National Laboratory (1969–1973). Rota was elected to the National Academy of Sciences in 1982, was vice president of the American Mathematical Society (AMS) from 1995–97, and was a member of numerous other mathematical and philosophical organizations.

He taught a difficult but very popular course in probability. He also taught Applications of Calculus, differential equations, and Combinatorial Theory. His philosophy course in phenomenology was offered on Friday nights to keep the enrollment manageable. Among his many eccentricities, he would not teach without a can of Coca-Cola, and handed out prizes ranging from Hershey bars to pocket knives to students who asked questions in class or did well on tests.

Rota began his career as a functional analyst, but switched to become a distinguished combinatorialist. His series of ten papers on the "Foundations of Combinatorics" in the 1960s is credited with making it a respectable branch of modern mathematics. He said that the one combinatorial idea he would like to be remembered for is the correspondence between combinatorial problems and problems of the location of the zeroes of polynomials. He worked on the theory of incidence algebras (which generalize the 19th-century theory of Möbius inversion) and popularized their study among combinatorialists, set the umbral calculus on a rigorous foundation, unified the theory of Sheffer sequences and polynomial sequences of binomial type, and worked on fundamental problems in probability theory. His philosophical work was largely in the phenomenology of Edmund Husserl.

Rota founded the Advances in Mathematics journal in 1961.

== Death ==
Rota died of atherosclerotic cardiac disease on April 18, 1999, apparently in his sleep at his home in Cambridge, Massachusetts.

== See also ==
- Kallman–Rota inequality
- Rota's conjecture
- Rota's basis conjecture
- Rota–Baxter algebra
- Joint spectral radius, introduced by Rota in the early 1960s
- Cyclotomic identity
- Necklace ring
- Twelvefold way
- List of American philosophers
