= Eugenio Calabi =

Italian-born American mathematician (1923–2023)

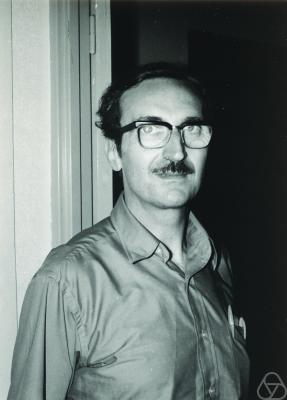
- Calabi c. 1960s
- Born: May 11, 1923; Milan, Kingdom of Italy
- Died: September 25, 2023 (aged 100); Bryn Mawr, Pennsylvania, US
- Education: Massachusetts Institute of Technology (BS); University of Illinois, Urbana-Champaign (MA); Princeton University (PhD)
- Known for: Calabi conjecture; Calabi–Yau manifold; Calabi flow; Calabi triangle; Calabi–Eckmann manifold
- Awards: Leroy P. Steele Prize (1991); Putnam Fellow (1946)
- Scientific career
- Fields: Differential geometry
- Workplaces: University of Pennsylvania; University of Minnesota; Louisiana State University
- Thesis: Isometric complex analytic imbedding of Kähler manifolds (1950)
- Doctoral advisor: Salomon Bochner
- Doctoral students: Xiu-Xiong Chen

Eugenio Calabi (May 11, 1923 – September 25, 2023) was an Italian-born American mathematician and the Thomas A. Scott Professor of Mathematics at the University of Pennsylvania, specializing in differential geometry, partial differential equations and their applications.

== Early life and education ==
Calabi was born in Milan, Italy on May 11, 1923, into a Jewish family. His sister was the journalist Tullia Zevi Calabi. In 1938, the family left Italy because of the racial laws, and in 1939 arrived in the United States.

In the fall of 1939, aged only 16, Calabi enrolled at the Massachusetts Institute of Technology, studying chemical engineering. His studies were interrupted when he was drafted in the US military in 1943 and served during World War II. Upon his discharge in 1946, Calabi was able to finish his bachelor's degree under the G.I. Bill, and was a Putnam Fellow. He received a master's degree in mathematics from the University of Illinois Urbana-Champaign in 1947 and his PhD in mathematics from Princeton University in 1950. His doctoral dissertation, titled "Isometric complex analytic imbedding of Kähler manifolds", was done under the supervision of Salomon Bochner.

== Academic career ==
From 1951 to 1955 he was an assistant professor at Louisiana State University, and he moved to the University of Minnesota in 1955, where he became a full professor in 1960. In 1964, Calabi joined the mathematics faculty at the University of Pennsylvania. Following the retirement of Hans Rademacher, he was appointed to the Thomas A. Scott Professorship of Mathematics at the University of Pennsylvania in 1968. In 1994, Calabi assumed emeritus status, and in 2014 the university awarded him an honorary doctorate of science.

In 1982, Calabi was elected to the National Academy of Sciences. He won the Leroy P. Steele Prize from the American Mathematical Society in 1991, where his "fundamental work on global differential geometry, especially complex differential geometry" was cited as having "profoundly changed the landscape of the field". In 2012, he became a fellow of the American Mathematical Society. In 2021, he was awarded Commander of the Order of Merit of the Italian Republic.

Calabi married Giuliana Segre in 1952, with whom he had a son and a daughter. He died on September 25, 2023, aged 100.

== Research ==
Calabi made a number of contributions to the field of differential geometry. Other contributions, not discussed here, include the construction of a holomorphic version of the long line with Maxwell Rosenlicht, a study of the moduli space of space forms, a characterization of when a metric can be found so that a given differential form is harmonic, and various works on affine geometry. In the comments on his collected works in 2021, Calabi cited his article "Improper affine hyperspheres of convex type and a generalization of a theorem by K. Jörgens" as that which he was "most proud of".

=== Kähler geometry ===
At the 1954 International Congress of Mathematicians, Calabi announced a theorem on how the Ricci curvature of a Kähler metric could be prescribed.^{[C54]} He later found that his proof, via the method of continuity, was flawed, and the result became known as the Calabi conjecture. In 1957, Calabi published a paper in which the conjecture was stated as a proposition, but with an openly incomplete proof.^{[C57]} He gave a complete proof that any solution of the problem must be uniquely defined, but was only able to reduce the problem of existence to the problem of establishing a priori estimates for certain partial differential equations. In the 1970s, Shing-Tung Yau began working on the Calabi conjecture, initially attempting to disprove it. After several years of work, he found a proof of the conjecture, and was able to establish several striking algebro-geometric consequences of its validity. As a particular case of the conjecture, Kähler metrics with zero Ricci curvature are established on a number of complex manifolds; these are now known as Calabi–Yau metrics. They have become significant in string theory research since the 1980s.

In 1982, Calabi introduced a geometric flow, now known as the Calabi flow, as a proposal for finding Kähler metrics of constant scalar curvature.^{[C82a]} More broadly, Calabi introduced the notion of an extremal Kähler metric, and established (among other results) that they provide strict global minima of the Calabi functional and that any constant scalar curvature metric is also a global minimum.^{[C85]} Later, Calabi and Xiuxiong Chen made an extensive study of the metric introduced by Toshiki Mabuchi, and showed that the Calabi flow contracts the Mabuchi distance between any two Kähler metrics.^{[CC02]} Furthermore, they showed that the Mabuchi metric endows the space of Kähler metrics with the structure of a Alexandrov space of nonpositive curvature. The technical difficulty of their work is that geodesics in their infinite-dimensional context may have low differentiability.

A well-known construction of Calabi's puts complete Kähler metrics on the total spaces of hermitian vector bundles whose curvature is bounded below.^{[C79]} In the case that the base is a complete Kähler–Einstein manifold and the vector bundle has rank one and constant curvature, one obtains a complete Kähler–Einstein metric on the total space. In the case of the cotangent bundle of a complex space form, one obtains a hyperkähler metric. The Eguchi–Hanson space is a special case of Calabi's construction.

=== Geometric analysis ===
Calabi found the Laplacian comparison theorem in Riemannian geometry, which relates the Laplace–Beltrami operator, as applied to the Riemannian distance function, to the Ricci curvature.^{[C58a]} The Riemannian distance function is generally not differentiable everywhere, which poses a difficulty in formulating a global version of the theorem. Calabi made use of a generalized notion of differential inequalities, predating the later viscosity solutions introduced by Michael Crandall and Pierre-Louis Lions. By extending the strong maximum principle of Eberhard Hopf to his notion of viscosity solutions, Calabi was able to use his Laplacian comparison theorem to extend recent results of Joseph Keller and Robert Osserman to Riemannian contexts. Further extensions, based on different uses of the maximum principle, were later found by Shiu-Yuen Cheng and Yau, among others.

In parallel to the classical Bernstein problem for minimal surfaces, Calabi considered the analogous problem for maximal surfaces, settling the question in low dimensions.^{[C70]} An unconditional answer for the Bernstein problem for maximal surfaces was found later by Shiu-Yuen Cheng and Shing-Tung Yau, making use of the Calabi trick that Calabi had pioneered to circumvent the non-differentiability of the Riemannian distance function. In analogous work, Calabi had earlier considered the convex solutions of the Monge–Ampère equation which are defined on all of Euclidean space and with 'right-hand side' equal to one. Konrad Jörgens had earlier studied this problem for functions of two variables, proving that any solution is a quadratic polynomial. By interpreting the problem as one of affine geometry, Calabi was able to apply his earlier work on the Laplacian comparison theorem to extend Jörgens' work to some higher dimensions.^{[C58b]} The problem was completely resolved later by Aleksei Pogorelov, and the result is commonly known as the Jörgens–Calabi–Pogorelov theorem.

Later, Calabi considered the problem of affine hyperspheres, first characterizing such surfaces as those for which the Legendre transform solves a certain Monge–Ampère equation. By adapting his earlier methods in extending Jörgens' theorem, Calabi was able to classify the complete affine elliptic hyperspheres.^{[C72]} Further results were later obtained by Cheng and Yau.

=== Differential geometry ===
Calabi and Beno Eckmann discovered the Calabi–Eckmann manifold in 1953.^{[CE53]} It is notable as a simply-connected complex manifold which does not admit any Kähler metrics.

Inspired by recent work of Kunihiko Kodaira, Calabi and Edoardo Vesentini considered the infinitesimal rigidity of compact holomorphic quotients of Cartan domains.^{[CV60]} Making use of the Bochner technique and Kodaira's developments of sheaf cohomology, they proved the rigidity of higher-dimensional cases. Their work was an influence on the later work of George Mostow and Grigori Margulis, who established their global rigidity results out of attempts to understand infinitesimal rigidity results such as Calabi and Vesentini's, along with related works by Atle Selberg and André Weil.

Calabi and Lawrence Markus considered the problem of space forms of positive curvature in Lorentzian geometry.^{[CM62]} Their results, which Joseph A. Wolf considered "very surprising", assert that the fundamental group must be finite, and that the corresponding group of isometries of de Sitter spacetime (under an orientability condition) will act faithfully by isometries on an equatorial sphere. As such, their space form problem reduces to the problem of Riemannian space forms of positive curvature.

Work of John Nash in the 1950s considered the problem of isometric embeddings. His work showed that such embeddings are very flexible and deformable. In his PhD thesis, Calabi had previously considered the special case of holomorphic isometric embeddings into complex-geometric space forms.^{[C53]} A striking result of his shows that such embeddings are completely determined by the intrinsic geometry and the curvature of the space form in question. Moreover, he was able to study the problem of existence via his introduction of the diastatic function, which is a locally defined function built from Kähler potentials and which mimics the Riemannian distance function. Calabi proved that a holomorphic isometric embedding must preserve the diastatic function. As a consequence, he was able to obtain a criterion for local existence of holomorphic isometric embeddings.

Later, Calabi studied the two-dimensional minimal surfaces (of high codimension) in round spheres.^{[C67]} He proved that the area of topologically spherical minimal surfaces can only take on a discrete set of values, and that the surfaces themselves are classified by rational curves in a certain hermitian symmetric space.

== Major publications ==
Calabi was the author of fewer than fifty research articles.

C53.	Calabi, Eugenio (1953). "Isometric imbedding of complex manifolds". Annals of Mathematics. Second Series. 58 (1): 1–23. doi:10.2307/1969817. JSTOR 1969817. MR 0057000. Zbl 0051.13103.

CE53.	Calabi, Eugenio; Eckmann, Beno (1953). "A class of compact, complex manifolds which are not algebraic". Annals of Mathematics. Second Series. 58 (3): 494–500. doi:10.2307/1969750. JSTOR 1969750. MR 0057539. Zbl 0051.40304.

C54.	Calabi, E. (1954). "The space of Kähler metrics" (PDF). In Gerretsen, Johan C. H.; De Groot, Johannes (eds.). Proceedings of the International Congress of Mathematicians, 1954. Volume II. Amsterdam: North-Holland Publishing Co. pp. 206–207.

C57.	Calabi, Eugenio (1957). "On Kähler manifolds with vanishing canonical class". In Fox, R. H. (ed.). Algebraic Geometry and Topology. A symposium in honor of S. Lefschetz. Princeton, NJ: Princeton University Press. pp. 78–89. doi:10.1515/9781400879915-006. ISBN 9781400879915. MR 0085583. Zbl 0080.15002.

C58a.	Calabi, E. (1958). "An extension of E. Hopf's maximum principle with an application to Riemannian geometry". Duke Mathematical Journal. 25: 45–56. doi:10.1215/S0012-7094-58-02505-5. MR 0092069. Zbl 0079.11801. (Erratum: doi:10.1215/S0012-7094-59-02672-9)

C58b.	Calabi, Eugenio (1958). "Improper affine hyperspheres of convex type and a generalization of a theorem by K. Jörgens". Michigan Mathematical Journal. 5 (2): 105–126. doi:10.1307/mmj/1028998055. MR 0106487. Zbl 0113.30104.

CV60.	Calabi, Eugenio; Vesentini, Edoardo (1960). "On compact, locally symmetric Kähler manifolds". Annals of Mathematics. Second Series. 71 (3): 472–507. doi:10.2307/1969939. JSTOR 1969939. MR 0111058. Zbl 0100.36002.

CM62.	Calabi, E.; Markus, L. (1962). "Relativistic space forms". Annals of Mathematics. Second Series. 75 (1): 63–76. doi:10.2307/1970419. JSTOR 1970419. MR 0133789. Zbl 0101.21804.

C67.	Calabi, Eugenio (1967). "Minimal immersions of surfaces in Euclidean spheres". Journal of Differential Geometry. 1 (1–2): 111–125. doi:10.4310/jdg/1214427884. MR 0233294. Zbl 0171.20504.

C70.	Calabi, Eugenio (1970). "Examples of Bernstein problems for some nonlinear equations". In Chern, Shiing-Shen; Smale, Stephen (eds.). Global Analysis. American Mathematical Society summer institute held at the University of California (Berkeley, CA) July 1–26, 1968. Proceedings of Symposia in Pure Mathematics. Vol. 15. Providence, RI: American Mathematical Society. pp. 223–230. doi:10.1090/pspum/015. ISBN 9780821814154. MR 0264210. Zbl 0211.12801.

C72.	Calabi, Eugenio (1972). Complete affine hyperspheres. I. Convegno di Geometria Differenziale (24–28 Maggio 1971); Convegno di Analisi Numerica (10–13 Gennaio 1972). Istituto Nazionale di Alta Matematica, Rome. Symposia Mathematica. Vol. X. London: Academic Press. pp. 19–38. MR 0365607. Zbl 0252.53008.

C79.	Calabi, E. (1979). "Métriques kählériennes et fibrés holomorphes". Annales Scientifiques de l'École Normale Supérieure. Quatrième Série. 12 (2): 269–294. doi:10.24033/asens.1367. MR 0543218. Zbl 0431.53056.

C82.	Calabi, Eugenio (1982). "Extremal Kähler metrics". In Yau, Shing-Tung (ed.). Seminar on Differential Geometry. Annals of Mathematics Studies. Vol. 102. Princeton, NJ: Princeton University Press. pp. 259–290. doi:10.1515/9781400881918-016. ISBN 9781400881918. MR 0645743. Zbl 0487.53057.

C85.	Calabi, Eugenio (1985). "Extremal Kähler Metrics II". In Chavel, I.; Farkas, H. M. (eds.). Differential Geometry and Complex Analysis. Berlin: Springer. pp. 95–114. doi:10.1007/978-3-642-69828-6_8. ISBN 978-3-642-69830-9. MR 0780039. Zbl 0574.58006.

CC02.	Calabi, E.; Chen, X. X. (2002). "The space of Kähler metrics. II". Journal of Differential Geometry. 61 (2): 173–193. arXiv:math/0108162. doi:10.4310/jdg/1090351383. MR 1969662. Zbl 1067.58010.

Calabi's collected works were published in 2021:

- Calabi, Eugenio (2021). Bourguignon, Jean-Pierre; Chen, Xiuxiong; Donaldson, Simon (eds.). Collected Works. Berlin: Springer. ISBN 978-3-662-62133-2. Zbl 1457.32001.
