= Maximal surface =

In the mathematical field of differential geometry, a maximal surface is a certain kind of submanifold of a Lorentzian manifold. Precisely, given a Lorentzian manifold (M, g), a maximal surface is a spacelike submanifold of M whose mean curvature is zero. As such, maximal surfaces in Lorentzian geometry are directly analogous to minimal surfaces in Riemannian geometry. The difference in terminology between the two settings has to do with the fact that small regions in maximal surfaces are local maximizers of the area functional, while small regions in minimal surfaces are local minimizers of the area functional.

In 1976, Shiu-Yuen Cheng and Shing-Tung Yau resolved the Bernstein problem for maximal surfaces of Minkowski space which are properly embedded, showing that any such hypersurface is a plane. This was part of the body of work for which Yau was awarded the Fields Medal in 1982. The Bernstein problem was originally posed by Eugenio Calabi in 1970, who proved some special cases of the result. Simple examples show that there are a number of hypersurfaces of Minkowski space of zero mean curvature which fail to be spacelike.

By an extension of Cheng and Yau's methods, Kazuo Akutagawa considered the case of spacelike hypersurfaces of constant mean curvature in Lorentzian manifolds of positive constant curvature, such as de Sitter space. Luis Alías, Alfonso Romero, and Miguel Sánchez proved a version of Cheng and Yau's result, replacing Minkowski space by the warped product of a closed Riemannian manifold with an interval.

As a problem of partial differential equations, Robert Bartnik and Leon Simon studied the boundary-value problem for maximal surfaces in Minkowski space. The general existence of maximal hypersurfaces in asymptotically flat Lorentzian manifolds, due to Bartnik, is significant in Demetrios Christodoulou and Sergiu Klainerman's renowned proof of the nonlinear stability of Minkowski space under the Einstein field equations. They use a maximal slicing of a general spacetime; the same approach is common in numerical relativity.
