= Konrad Voss =

German mathematician

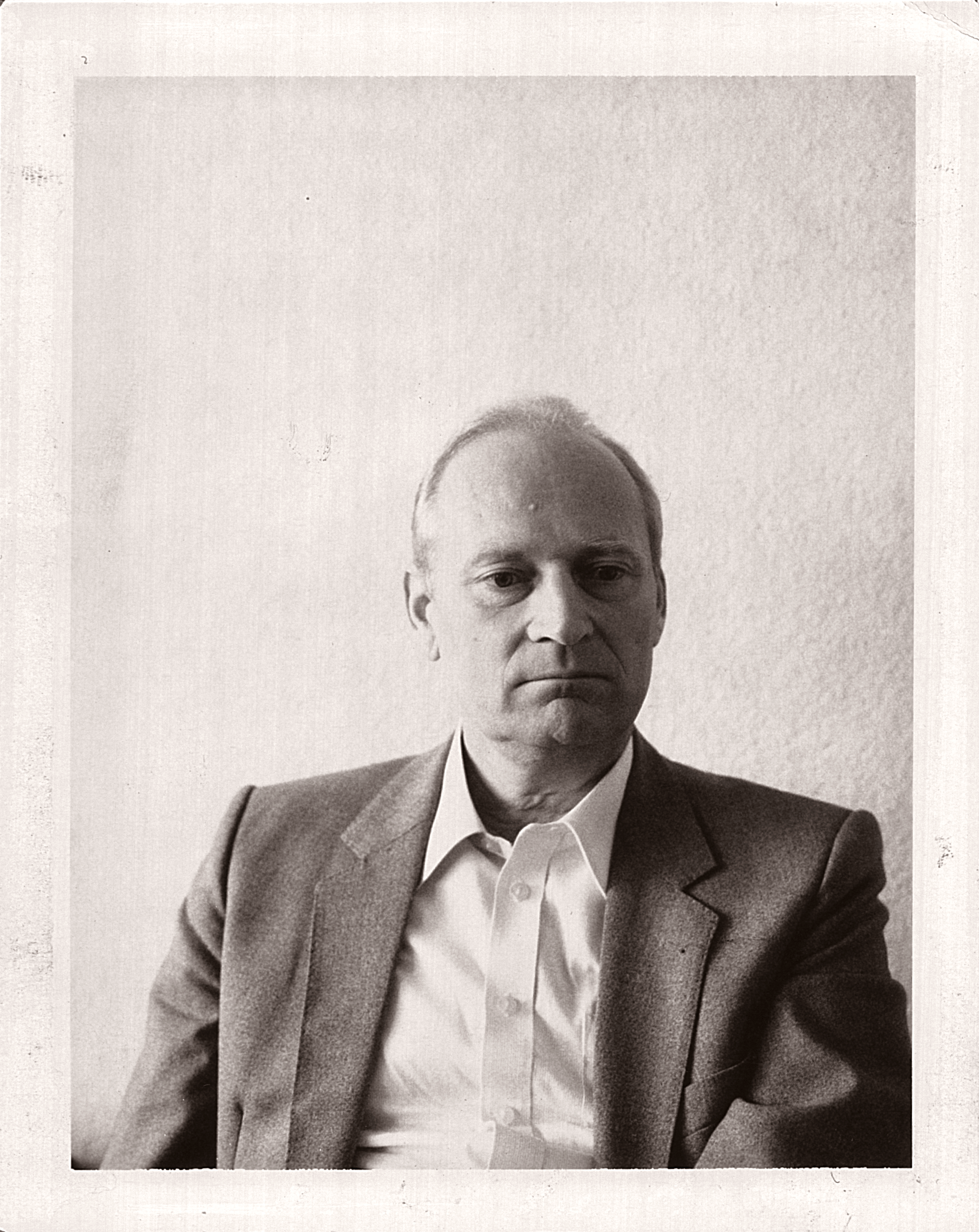
Voss in c. 1980

Konrad Voss (August 9, 1928 – March 30, 2017) was a German mathematician and a professor in Switzerland, at ETH Zurich.

== Life ==
Konrad Voss was born on August 9, 1928 in Berlin. His studies were interrupted by World War II, after which he studied for two terms at the University of Berlin before continuing his studies at ETH Zurich beginning in 1948. He received a degree there in 1951, after which he worked as an assistant to Beno Eckmann. He defended his doctoral dissertation on differential geometry, Einige differentialgeometrische Kongruenzsätze für geschlossene Flächen und Hyperflächen, in 1955, with Heinz Hopf and Albert Pfluger as his examiners.

As early as 1960, the Federal Council appointed him assistant professor of mathematics, in particular geometry in German, at ETH Zurich. After only three years, Konrad Voss was promoted to full professor, and his professorship was later renamed the Professorship of Mathematics. For several years he also held the post of head of the department of mathematics and physics.

He retired in 1995, and died on March 30, 2017.

== Research ==
One of Voss's research contributions concerns the Osserman–Xavier–Fujimoto theorem, according to which the Gauss map of a geodesically complete and non-flat minimal surface covers the sphere, except for at most four points. Voss proved that this result is optimal, by finding minimal surfaces whose Gauss maps cover every subset of the sphere obtained by removing at most four points.
