= Mese =

Mese may refer to:

- Chikako Mese, American mathematician
- Mese, Myanmar, a town in Kayah State of eastern Myanmar
- Mese, Lombardy, a comune (municipality) in the province of Sondrio, Italy
- Mese, the Hungarian name for Meşendorf village, Buneşti Commune, Braşov County, Romania
- Mese (mythology), one of the three Muses of the lyre that were worshipped at Delphi
- Mese (Constantinople), the main road of Constantinople
- Mese, Ancient Greek comedy of the middle period, 385-323 BCE
- Matsya Kingdom, an Indian/Central Asian kingdom, classically called the Mese or Mesë
