= David Allen Hoffman =

American mathematician

- Education: Stanford University (PhD)
- Occupation: Mathematician
- Awards: Chauvenet Prize (1990)

David Allen Hoffman is an American mathematician whose research concerns differential geometry. He is an adjunct professor at Stanford University. In 1985, together with William Meeks, he proved that Costa's surface was embedded. He is a fellow of the American Mathematical Society since 2018, for "contributions to differential geometry, particularly minimal surface theory, and for pioneering the use of computer graphics as an aid to research." He was awarded the Chauvenet Prize in 1990 for his expository article "The Computer-Aided Discovery of New Embedded Minimal Surfaces". He obtained his Ph.D. from Stanford University in 1971 under the supervision of Robert Osserman.

== Technical contributions ==
In 1973, James Michael and Leon Simon established a Sobolev inequality for functions on submanifolds of Euclidean space, in a form which is adapted to the mean curvature of the submanifold and takes on a special form for minimal submanifolds. One year later, Hoffman and Joel Spruck extended Michael and Simon's work to the setting of functions on immersed submanifolds of Riemannian manifolds.^{[HS74]} Such inequalities are useful for many problems in geometric analysis which deal with some form of prescribed mean curvature. As usual for Sobolev inequalities, Hoffman and Spruck were also able to derive new isoperimetric inequalities for submanifolds of Riemannian manifolds.^{[HS74]}

It is well known that there is a wide variety of minimal surfaces in the three-dimensional Euclidean space. Hoffman and William Meeks proved that any minimal surface which is contained in a half-space must fail to be properly immersed.^{[HM90]} That is, there must exist a compact set in Euclidean space which contains a noncompact region of the minimal surface. The proof is a simple application of the maximum principle and unique continuation for minimal surfaces, based on comparison with a family of catenoids. This enhances a result of Meeks, Leon Simon, and Shing-Tung Yau, which states that any two complete and properly immersed minimal surfaces in three-dimensional Euclidean space, if both are nonplanar, either have a point of intersection or are separated from each other by a plane. Hoffman and Meeks' result rules out the latter possibility.

== Major publications ==
- HS74.	Hoffman, David; Spruck, Joel (1974). "Sobolev and isoperimetric inequalities for Riemannian submanifolds". Communications on Pure and Applied Mathematics. 27 (6): 715–727. doi:10.1002/cpa.3160270601. MR 0365424. Zbl 0295.53025. (Erratum: doi:10.1002/cpa.3160280607)
- HM90.	Hoffman, D.; Meeks, W. H. III (1990). "The strong halfspace theorem for minimal surfaces". Inventiones Mathematicae. 101 (2): 373–377. Bibcode:1990InMat.101..373H. doi:10.1007/bf01231506. MR 1062966. S2CID 10695064. Zbl 0722.53054.
