= Mathematics of Computation =

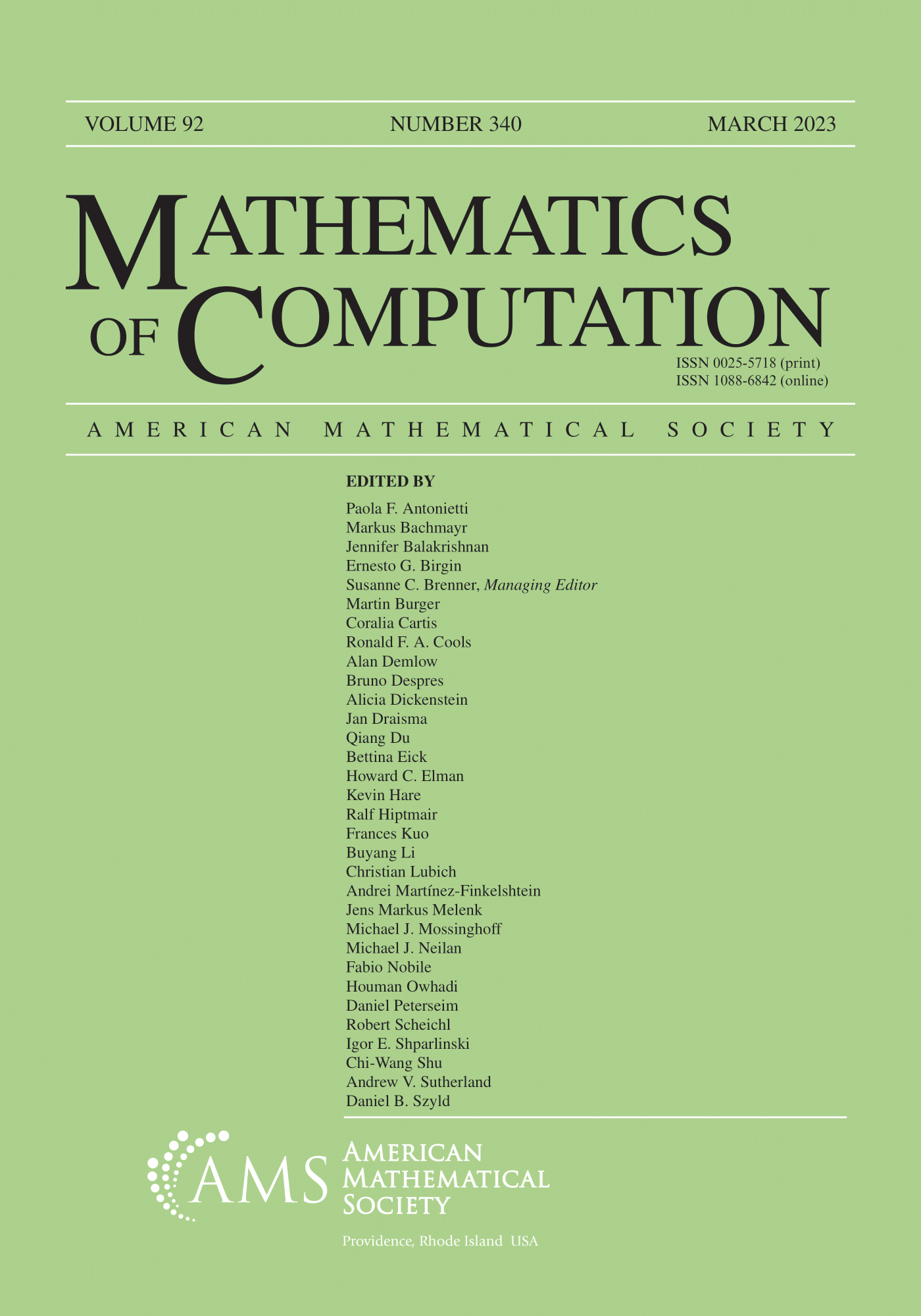
- Discipline: Mathematics
- Language: English
- Edited by: Susanne C. Brenner

Publication details
- Former names: Mathematical Tables and Other Aids to Computation
- History: 1943–present
- Publisher: American Mathematical Society
- Frequency: Bimonthly
- Open access: Delayed, after 5 years
- Impact factor: 2.417 (2020)

Standard abbreviations
- ISO 4: Math. Comput.
- MathSciNet: Math. Comp.

Indexing
- CODEN: MCMPAF
- ISSN: 0025-5718 (print); 1088-6842 (web)
- LCCN: gs45000054
- JSTOR: 00255718
- OCLC no.: 24991469

Links
- Journal homepage; Online archive

Mathematics of Computation is a bimonthly mathematics journal focused on computational mathematics. It was established in 1943 as Mathematical Tables and Other Aids to Computation, obtaining its current name in 1960. Articles older than five years are available electronically free of charge.

Past editors have included Raymond C. Archibald, D. H. Lehmer, Eugene Isaacson, and Walter Gautschi, with Leslie Comrie providing 'cooperation' in editing during 1944-1949.

== Abstracting and indexing ==
The journal is abstracted and indexed in Mathematical Reviews, Zentralblatt MATH, Science Citation Index, CompuMath Citation Index, and Current Contents/Physical, Chemical & Earth Sciences. According to the Journal Citation Reports, the journal has a 2024 impact factor of 2.1.
