= William Hamilton Meeks, III =

American mathematician

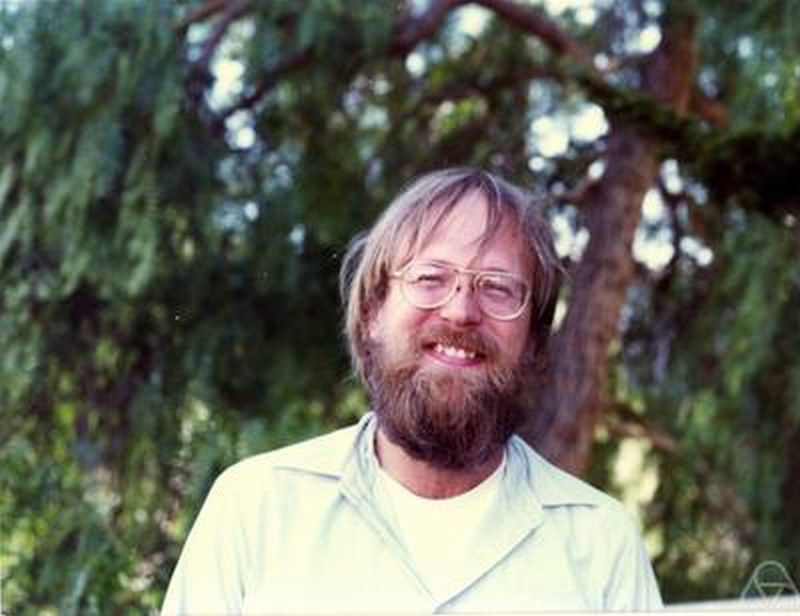
- William Meeks, Berkeley 1981
- Born: William Hamilton Meeks, III; 8 August 1947 (age 79); Washington, D.C.
- Died: 24 May 2026
- Education: University of California, Berkeley (BS, MS, PhD)
- Scientific career
- Fields: Differential geometry; Minimal surfaces
- Thesis: The Conformal Structure and Geometry of Triply Periodic Minimal Surfaces in $\mathbb R ^ 3$

William Hamilton Meeks, III (August 8, 1947 - May 24, 2026) was an American mathematician, specializing in differential geometry and minimal surfaces.

== Biography ==
Meeks studied at the University of California, Berkeley, with a bachelor's degree in 1971, a master's degree in 1974, and a PhD in 1975 with supervisor H. Blaine Lawson and thesis The Conformal Structure and Geometry of Triply Periodic Minimal Surfaces in $\mathbb R ^ 3$. He was an assistant professor in 1975–1977 at the University of California, Los Angeles (UCLA), in 1977–1978 at the Instituto de Matemática Pura e Aplicada (IMPA), and in 1978–1979 at Stanford University. From 1979 to 1983 he was a professor at IMPA. He was from 1983 to 1984 a visiting member of the Institute for Advanced Study and from 1984 to 1986 a professor at Rice University with the academic year 1985–1986 spent as a visiting professor at the University of California, Santa Barbara. From 1986 to 2018 he was the George David Birkhoff Professor of Mathematics at the University of Massachusetts, Amherst. Later, he was at the Institute for Advanced Study after assuming professor emeritus status at UMass Amherst.

He was known as an expert on minimal surfaces and their computer graphics visualization; on the latter subject he collaborated with David Allen Hoffman. For the academic year 2006/07 Meeks was a Guggenheim Fellow.

In 1986 at the International Congress of Mathematicians in Berkeley, he was Invited Speaker with talk Recent progress on the geometry of surfaces in $R ^ 3$ and on the use of computer graphics as a research tool.

== Selected publications ==
- with Shing-Tung Yau: Meeks, William H; Yau, Shing-Tung (1980). "Topology of three dimensional manifolds and the embedding problems in minimal surface theory". Annals of Mathematics. 112 (3): 441–484. doi:10.2307/1971088. JSTOR 1971088.
- Meeks, William H (1981). "A survey of the geometric results in the classical theory of minimal surfaces". Bol. Soc. Bras. Mat. 12 (1): 29–86. doi:10.1007/BF02588319. S2CID 126810651.
- with Leon Simon and S.-T. Yau: Iii, William Meeks; Simon, Leon; Yau, Shing-Tung (1982). "Embedded minimal surfaces, exotic spheres, and manifolds with positive Ricci curvature". Ann. of Math. 116 (3): 621–659. doi:10.2307/2007026. JSTOR 2007026.
- with S.-T. Yau: Meeks, William W; Yau, Shing-Tung (1982). "The existence of embedded minimal surfaces and the problem of uniqueness". Mathematische Zeitschrift. 179 (2): 151–168. doi:10.1007/BF01214308. S2CID 120139274.
- with L. P. Jorge: Jorge, Luquesio P; Meeks, William H (1983). "The topology of complete minimal surfaces of finite total Gaussian curvature". Topology. 22 (2): 203–221. doi:10.1016/0040-9383(83)90032-0.
- with G. Peter Scott: Meeks, William H; Scott, Peter (1986). "Finite group actions on 3-manifolds". Inventiones Mathematicae. 86 (2): 287–346. Bibcode:1986InMat..86..287M. doi:10.1007/BF01389073. S2CID 121224357.
- with David Allen Hoffman: Hoffman, David; Meeks, William H (1990). "Embedded minimal surfaces of finite topology". Ann. of Math. 131 (1): 1–34. arXiv:1506.07793. doi:10.2307/1971506. JSTOR 1971506. S2CID 55090193.
- with D. Hoffman: Hoffman, D; Meeks, W. H (1990). "The strong half space theorem for minimal surfaces". Inventiones Mathematicae. 101 (1): 373–377. Bibcode:1990InMat.101..373H. doi:10.1007/BF01231506. S2CID 10695064.
- "The geometry, topology, and existence of periodic minimal surfaces". in: Differential geometry: partial differential equations on manifolds (Proceedings of the Summer Research Institute on Differential Geometry held at UCLA. Los Angeles, CA, July 8–28, 1990). Proceedings of Symposia in Pure Mathematics. Vol. 54, Part 1. Amer. Math. Soc. 1993. pp. 333–374. doi:10.1090/pspum/054.1. ISBN 9780821814949.
- Meeks, W. H (2003). "Geometric results in classical minimal surface theory". Surveys in Differential Geometry. 8 (1): 269–306. doi:10.4310/SDG.2003.v8.n1.a10.
- with Harold Rosenberg: Meeks, William H; Rosenberg, Harold (2005). "The uniqueness of the helicoid". Ann. of Math. 161 (2): 727–758. doi:10.4007/annals.2005.161.727. JSTOR 3597317.
- with Joaquín Pérez: Meeks Iii, William H; Pérez, Joaquín (2011). "The classical theory of minimal surfaces". Bull. Amer. Math. Soc. (N.S.). 48 (3): 325–407. doi:10.1090/S0273-0979-2011-01334-9.
- with J. Pérez and Giuseppe Tinaglia: Meeks III, William H; Perez, Joaquin; Tinaglia, Giuseppe (2016). "Constant mean curvature surfaces". arXiv:1605.02512 [math.DG].
