= Shapiro's lemma =

Mathematical relation in abstract algrebra

In mathematics, especially in the areas of abstract algebra dealing with group cohomology or relative homological algebra, Shapiro's lemma, also known as the Eckmann–Shapiro lemma, relates extensions of modules over one ring to extensions over another, especially the group ring of a group and of a subgroup. It thus relates the group cohomology with respect to a group to the cohomology with respect to a subgroup. Shapiro's lemma is named after Arnold S. Shapiro, who proved it in 1961; however, Beno Eckmann had discovered it earlier, in 1953.

== Statement for rings ==
Let R → S be a ring homomorphism, so that S becomes a left and right R-module. Let M be a left S-module and N a left R-module. By restriction of scalars, M is also a left R-module.

- If S is projective as a right R-module, then:

$$\operatorname{Ext}^n_R(N, {}_R M) \cong \operatorname{Ext}^n_S(S \otimes_R N, M)$$

- If S is projective as a left R-module, then:

$$\operatorname{Ext}^n_R({}_R M,N) \cong \operatorname{Ext}^n_S(M,\operatorname{Hom}_R(S,N))$$

See (Benson 1991, p. 47). The projectivity conditions can be weakened into conditions on the vanishing of certain Tor- or Ext-groups: see (Cartan & Eilenberg 1956, p. 118, VI.§5).

== Statement for group rings ==
When H is a subgroup of finite index in G, then the group ring R[G] is finitely generated projective as a left and right R[H] module, so the previous theorem applies in a simple way. Let M be a finite-dimensional representation of G and N a finite-dimensional representation of H. In this case, the module S ⊗_{R} N is called the induced representation of N from H to G, and _{R}M is called the restricted representation of M from G to H. One has that:

$$\operatorname{Ext}^n_G( M, N\uparrow_H^G) \cong \operatorname{Ext}^n_H( M\downarrow_H^G, N)$$

When n = 0, this is called Frobenius reciprocity for completely reducible modules, and Nakayama reciprocity in general. See (Benson 1991, p. 42), which also contains these higher versions of the Mackey decomposition.

== Statement for group cohomology ==
Specializing M to be the trivial module produces the familiar Shapiro's lemma. Let H be a subgroup of G and N a representation of H. For N^{G} the induced representation of N from H to G using the tensor product, and for H_{$\ast$} the group homology:

H_{$\ast$}(G, N^{G}) = H_{$\ast$}(H, N)

Similarly, for N^{G} the co-induced representation of N from H to G using the Hom functor, and for H^{$\ast$} the group cohomology:

H^{$\ast$}(G, N^{G}) = H^{$\ast$}(H, N)

When H has finite index in G, then the induced and coinduced representations coincide and the lemma is valid for both homology and cohomology.

See (Weibel 1994, p. 172).

== See also ==
- Change of rings
