= Herbert Keller =

American mathematician (1925–2008)

Herbert Bishop Keller
- Born: June 19, 1925; Paterson, New Jersey, USA
- Died: January 26, 2008 (aged 82); Pasadena, California, USA
- Education: Georgia Institute of Technology; New York University
- Relatives: Joseph Keller (brother)
- Scientific career
- Institutions: Sarah Lawrence College; Washington Square College; New York University; United States Atomic Energy Commission; California Institute of Technology
- Thesis: On Systems of Linear Ordinary Differential Equations with Applications to Ionospheric Propagation (1954)
- Doctoral advisor: Wilhelm Magnus; Joseph Keller
- Doctoral students: James Keener

Herbert Bishop Keller (19 June 1925 in Paterson, New Jersey – 26 January 2008 in Pasadena, California) was an American applied mathematician and numerical analyst. He was professor of applied mathematics, emeritus, at the California Institute of Technology.

== Early life and education ==
Keller graduated from the Georgia Institute of Technology with a bachelor's in electrical engineering in 1945; and from New York University, later known as the Courant Institute, with a Ph.D. in 1954.

== Career ==
A Fellow of the American Academy of Arts and Sciences, Keller was known for his contributions to the field of applied mathematics and numerical analysis including bifurcation theory, computational fluid dynamics (CFD), and scientific computing. He is the co-author, with Eugene Isaacson, of the classic textbook Analysis of Numerical Methods, which is still in use in leading graduate programs in applied mathematics. It is interesting to observe that the first letters of each sentence in the Preface spell "Down With Computers And Their Lackeys." He served as president of the Society for Industrial and Applied Mathematics (1974–1976).

Keller was a recipient of the Theodore von Kármán Prize of the Society for Industrial and Applied Mathematics in 1994. Herbert was the younger brother of applied mathematician Joseph B. Keller. Joseph Keller was also a co-advisor for Herbert's PhD thesis.

Keller was an avid bicyclist even at 82 years old. He died after his regular Saturday morning bike ride when he took a dip in a hot tub to relax his muscles, lost consciousness due to hyperthermia, and drowned.
