= James Keener =

American mathematician

- Education: California Institute of Technology
- Known for: monodomain model mathematical cardiology models
- Awards: SIAM Fellow (2012)
- Scientific career
- Fields: mathematical biology physiology
- Workplaces: University of Arizona; University of Utah
- Thesis: Some Modified Bifurcation Problems with Application to Imperfection Sensitivity in Buckling (1972)
- Doctoral advisor: Herbert Bishop Keller

James "Jim" Paul Keener is an American mathematician, currently Distinguished Professor at University of Utah. He is recognized as a pioneer in the field of mathematical physiology and cardiology.

== Biography ==
Jim Keener received his PhD from the California Institute of Technology in 1972. Initially intending to work on bifurcation theory, he came across a paper by Otto Rossler that implied that heartbeat can be modeled using chaos theory. Looking to investigate this claim, he picked up the Textbook of Medical Physiology by Arthur Guyton to build some foundational knowledge in cardiology and discovered examples of dynamical systems that had previously been untouched by the applied mathematics community. He was invited to join the faculty at the University of Utah in 1978 by Frank Hoppensteadt to start a new group in mathematical biology. He served as editor-in-chief of the SIAM Journal on Applied Mathematics and was named a SIAM Fellow in 2012.

== Publications ==
- Keener, J.P. (1999). Principles of Applied Mathematics: Transformation and Approximation (2nd ed.). Perseus Books. ISBN 0-7382-0129-4.
- Keener, J.P.; Sneyd, J. (2008). Mathematical Physiology (2nd ed.). Springer.
