= Tatiana Toro =

Colombian–American mathematician (born 1964)

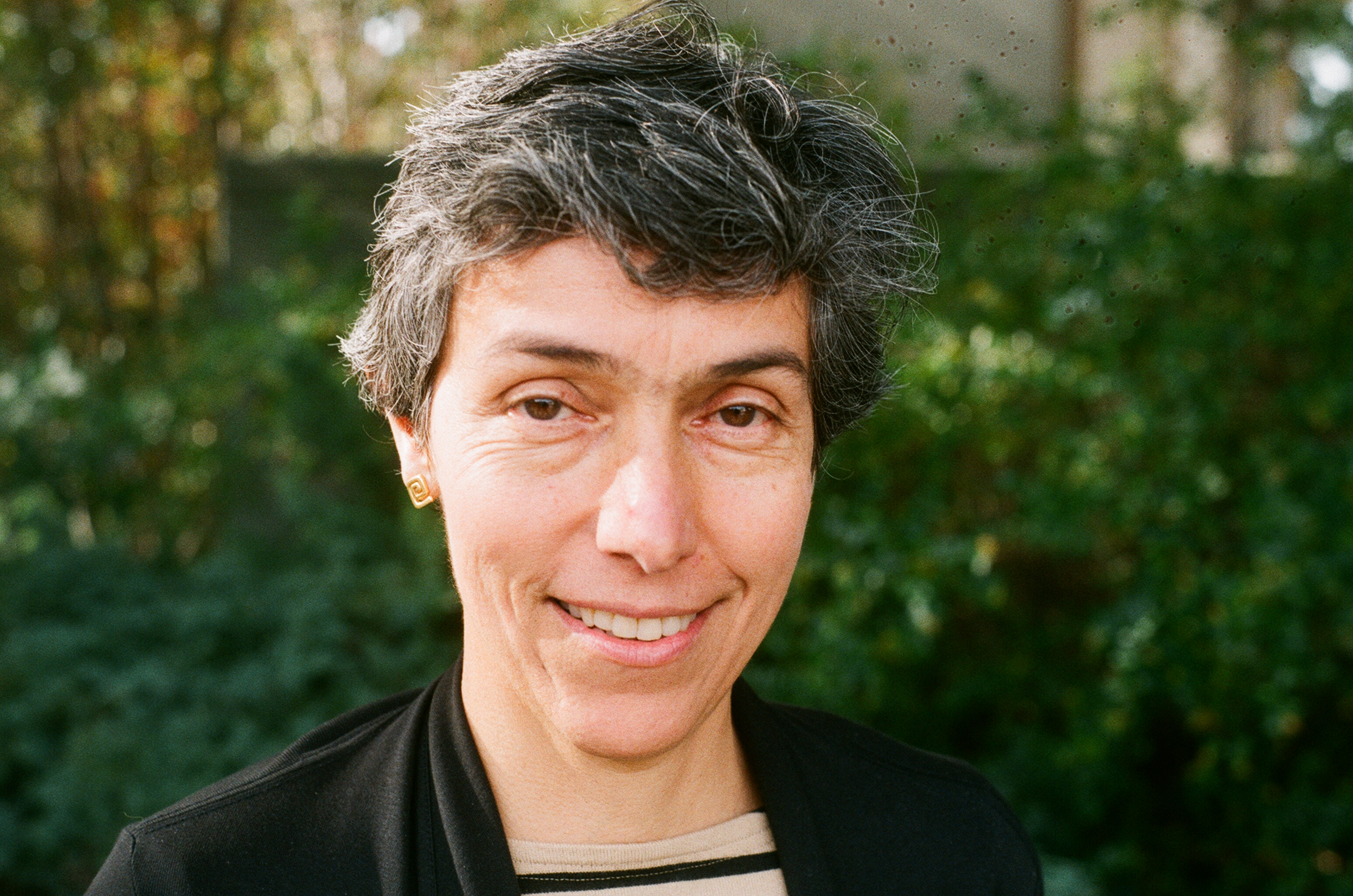
- Toro in 2016
- Born: 1964 (age 61–62); Colombia
- Education: National University of Colombia (BS); Stanford University (Ph.D.)
- Awards: Guggenheim Fellowship (2015); Blackwell–Tapia prize (2020)
- Scientific career
- Fields: Mathematics
- Workplaces: University of Washington; Simons Laufer Mathematical Sciences Institute
- Thesis: Functions in W^{2,2}(R^{2}) have Lipschitz graphs (1992)
- Doctoral advisor: Leon Simon

Tatiana Toro (born 1964) is a Colombian-American mathematician at the University of Washington. Her research is "at the interface of geometric measure theory, harmonic analysis and partial differential equations". Toro was appointed director of the Simons Laufer Mathematical Sciences Institute for 2022–2027.

== Education and employment ==
Toro was born in 1964 in Colombia, and attended the Lycée Français Louis Pasteur in Bogotá. She competed for Colombia in the 1981 International Mathematical Olympiad, and earned a bachelor's degree from the National University of Colombia. In 1992, she was awarded her PhD at Stanford University, under the supervision of Leon Simon. After short-term positions at the Institute for Advanced Study, University of California, Berkeley, and University of Chicago, she joined the University of Washington faculty in 1996. Since August 2022, Toro serves as the director of Simons Laufer Mathematical Sciences Institute (formerly MSRI). She will maintain her tenure at the University of Washington throughout her term.

== Honors and awards ==
Toro was an invited speaker at the International Congress of Mathematicians in 2010. She became a Guggenheim Fellow in 2015. She was elected as a member of the 2017 class of Fellows of the American Mathematical Society "for contributions to geometric measure theory, potential theory, and free boundary theory". At the University of Washington, she was the Robert R. & Elaine F. Phelps Professor in Mathematics from 2012 to 2016 and is currently the Craig McKibben and Sarah Merner Professor. Toro was named MSRI Chancellor's Professor for 2016–17. She was awarded the 2020 Blackwell-Tapia Prize. She was elected fellow of the American Academy of Arts and Sciences (AAAS) in 2020. Toro was awarded the ICMAM Prize 2022 of the research organization ICMAM Latin America. Toro was honored as the AWM/MAA Falconer Lecturer in 2023.
