= Simons Laufer Mathematical Sciences Institute =

Research institute

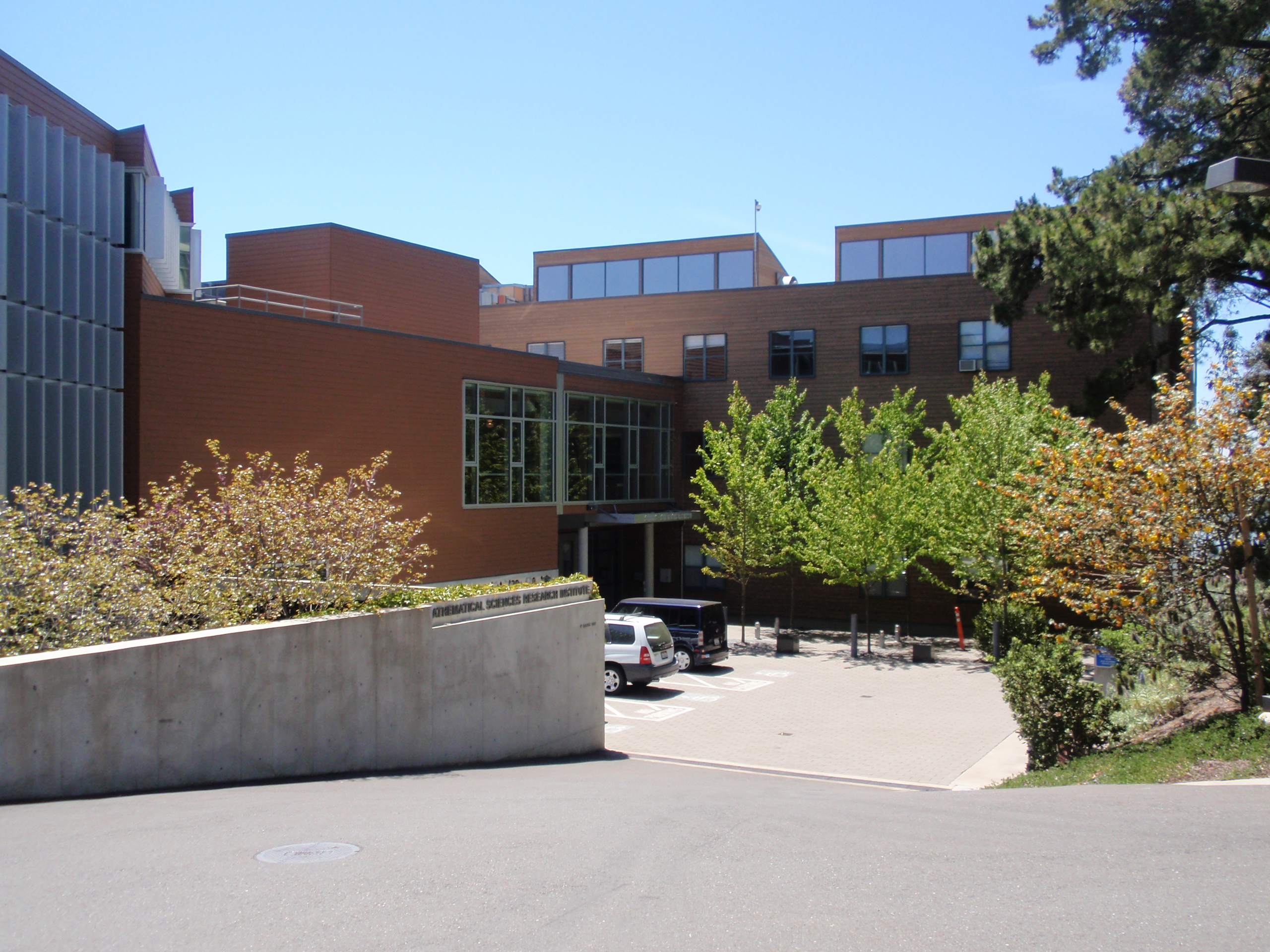
- The MSRI entrance, May 2011
- Former name: Mathematical Sciences Research Institute
- Type: 501(c)(3) nonprofit mathematical research institute
- Established: 1982; 44 years ago
- Founders: Shiing-Shen Chern; Calvin Moore; Isadore M. Singer
- Endowment: $89 million (2022)
- Director: Tatiana Toro
- Location: 17 Gauss Way, Berkeley, California, United States; 37.879799°N 122.244294°W
- Website: slmath.org

The Simons Laufer Mathematical Sciences Institute (SLMath), formerly the Mathematical Sciences Research Institute (MSRI), is an independent nonprofit mathematical research institution located on the University of California campus in Berkeley, California. It is a center for research in mathematics. Each year, over 1,700 mathematicians spend time at SLMath. The institute is located at 17 Gauss Way on the Berkeley campus, close to Grizzly Peak in the Berkeley Hills.

The institute was founded in 1982, and its funding sources include the National Science Foundation, private foundations, corporations, individual donors, and 110 academic sponsor universities and institutions in the U.S. and internationally.

In May 2022, the institute received a $70 million gift from James and Marilyn Simons and Henry and Marsha Laufer. It was then renamed the Simons Laufer Mathematical Sciences Institute (SLMath).

== History ==
The institute was founded in September 1982 by Berkeley professors Shiing-Shen Chern, Calvin Moore, and Isadore M. Singer. Shiing-Shen Chern acted as the founding director of the institute, Calvin Moore acted as the founding deputy director, and Isadore Singer was the inaugural chair of the institute's Scientific Advisory Committee.

Originally located in Berkeley's extension building at 2223 Fulton Street, the institute moved into its current facility at 17 Gauss Way in the Berkeley hills on April 1, 1985. The institute initially paid rent to the university for its "Hill Campus" building, Shiing-Shen Chern Hall, but since August 2000, it has occupied the building free of rent, one of several contributions by the Berkeley campus. Chern Hall underwent substantial renovations in 2006 to add an auditorium, board room, library, and additional office facilities. The building features public art including a mathematical mosaic by artists Linda Vanderkolk and Scott Frankenberger and sculptures by Helaman Ferguson and Wei Li "Willy" Wang.

Jim Simons, a Berkeley alumnus and founder of Renaissance Technologies and, with his wife Marilyn Simons, the Simons Foundation, was a long-time supporter of the institute and both served on the MSRI / SLMath board of trustees.

== Governance ==
SLMath is governed by a board of trustees consisting of 16-40 elected members and ex-officio members, including the director of the institute, the deputy director, and the co-chairs of the institute's advisory committees.

Unlike many mathematical institutes, SLMath has no permanent faculty or members, and its research activities are overseen by its Scientific Advisory Committee (SAC), a panel of mathematicians drawn from a variety of different areas of mathematical research. There are ten regular members in the SAC, and each member serves a four-year term and is elected by the board of trustees.

== Research activities ==
SLMath hosts mathematicians and postdoctoral research fellows each semester and holds programs and workshops throughout the year. SLMath features 1-2 focused semester-long research programs each fall and a series of several month-long research programs in spring, attended by mathematical scientists and researchers from the United States and abroad. In summer, SLMath hosts summer research programs for small teams of researchers, including Promoting Research Opportunities and Open Forums (PROOF) and Lasting Alliance Through Team Immersion and Collaborative Exploration (LATTICE).

The institute has collaborated with organizations across the nation, including the nearby Berkeley campus and Lawrence Berkeley National Laboratory, Chicago Mercantile Exchange, Citadel LLC, IBM, and Microsoft Research.

== Education programs and publications ==
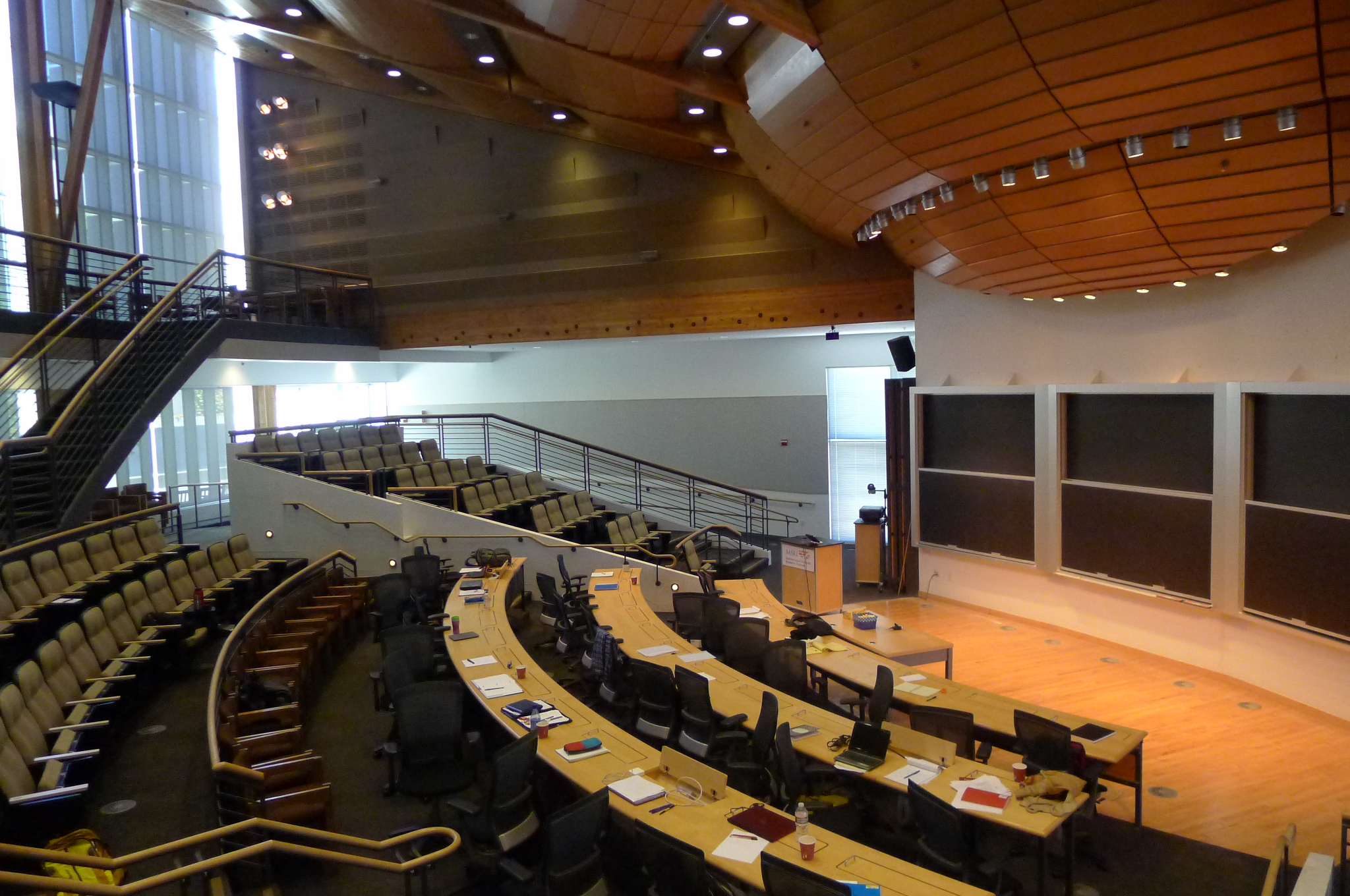
Simons Auditorium

SLMath also serves a wider community through the development of mathematical talent, providing postdoctoral training to young scientists and increasing the diversity of the research workforce. During the summer, the institute holds summer schools in the U.S. and abroad for graduate students. The institute's MSRI-UP Research Experiences for Undergraduates is aimed at undergraduate students who have completed two years of university-level mathematics coursework and has been recognized by the White House with the Presidential Award for Excellence in Science, Mathematics, and Engineering Mentoring and by the American Mathematical Society (AMS).

The mathematics lectures given at the institute's workshops are recorded and made available for free on the internet. SLMath publishes the AMS-MSRI Mathematical Circles Library series with the American Mathematical Society, the MSRI Publication Series with Cambridge University Press (earlier volumes were published with Springer-Verlag), and has sponsored volumes of the Celebratio Mathematica open-access journal.

The institute hosts an annual Critical Issues in Mathematics Education workshop on K-12 and undergraduate mathematics education research and publishes a booklet series about the workshops.

As MSRI, it previously organized the National Math Festival in Washington, D.C. from 2015-2022, as well as programs for middle and high school students and their teachers as part of the Math Circles movement, as well as Celebration of Mind festivals honoring the legacy of writer Martin Gardner. It has also sponsored the Bay Area Mathematical Olympiad (BAMO), the Julia Robinson Mathematics Festival, and the U.S. team that competed at the China Girls Math Olympiad. From 2013-2024, it sponsored YouTube's Numberphile channel.

From 2006-2021, the institute award the CME Group-MSRI Prize in Innovative Quantitative Applications for "originality and innovation in the use of mathematical, statistical or computational methods for the study of the behavior of markets". Many recipients were later awarded the Nobel Memorial Prize in Economic Sciences, including Paul Milgrom, Robert B. Wilson, Douglas Diamond, José Scheinkman, Bengt Holmström, Robert J. Shiller, Thomas J. Sargent, Jean Tirole, and Lars Peter Hansen.

SLMath sponsors public events including art exhibits, public lectures, and theater and musical performances. Mathematician Robert Osserman held a series of public "conversations" with artists who have been influenced by mathematics in their work, such as composer Philip Glass, actor and writer Steve Martin with guest Robin Williams, playwright Tom Stoppard, and actor and author Alan Alda. The institute collaborated with local playwrights for an annual program of new short mathematics-inspired plays at the Berkeley Repertory Theater, and co-sponsored a series of mathematics-inspired films with UC Berkeley's Pacific Film Archive.

== Mathical Book Prize ==
Since 2015, SLMath has organized the Mathical Book Prize, awarded to outstanding trade fiction and literary nonfiction "that inspire children of all ages to see math in the world around them." The Mathical Prize is selected by a committee of PreK-12 math and language arts teachers, librarians, mathematicians, and early childhood educators. Award partners include the National Council of Teachers of English, National Council of Teachers of Mathematics, and the Children's Book Council (United States).

Recipients of the Mathical Book Prize include John Rocco, Robie Harris, Jeffrey Kluger, Lauren Child, Michael J. Rosen, Leopoldo Gout, Elisha Cooper, Kate Banks, Gene Luen Yang, Steve Light, and Richard Evan Schwartz. Over 200 titles have been awarded the prize as of 2026.

== Documentary films with Zala Films ==
The institute partners with director George Csicsery of Zala Films to produce documentary films for U.S. public television featuring profiles of prominent mathematicians, including Maryam Mirzakhani, Yitang Zhang, Shiing-Shen Chern, and Vaughan Jones and Hendrik Lenstra. Several of the films have aired on PBS and American Public Television affiliate stations.

- Journeys of Black Mathematicians: Creating Pathways (2025)
- Journeys of Black Mathematicians: Forging Resilience (2024)
- Secrets of the Surface: The Mathematical Vision of Maryam Mirzakhani (2020)
- Navajo Math Circles (2016)
- Counting from Infinity: Yitang Zhang and the Twin Prime Conjecture (2015)
- Taking the Long View: The Life of Shiing-Shen Chern (2011)
- porridge, pulleys, and pi: Two Mathematical Journeys (2004)

== List of directors ==
| Image | Name | Timespan |
|---|---|---|
| | Shiing-Shen Chern | 1982–1984 |
| | Irving Kaplansky | 1984–1992 |
| | William Thurston | 1992–1997 |
| | David Eisenbud | 1997–2007 |
| | Robert Bryant | 2007–2013 |
| | David Eisenbud | 2013–2022 |
| | Tatiana Toro | 2022–present |

== See also ==
- Institute for Pure and Applied Mathematics
- National Science Foundation Math Institutes
