= Osserman–Xavier–Fujimoto theorem =

Topological theorem

In the mathematical field of differential geometry, the Osserman–Xavier–Fujimoto theorem concerns the Gauss maps of minimal surfaces in the three-dimensional Euclidean space. It says that if a minimal surface is immersed and geodesically complete, then the image of the Gauss map either consists of a single point (so that the surface is a plane) or contains all of the sphere except for at most four points.

Bernstein's theorem says that a minimal graph in R^{3} which is geodesically complete must be a plane. This can be rephrased to say that the Gauss map of a complete immersed minimal surface in R^{3} is either constant or not contained within an open hemisphere. As conjectured by Louis Nirenberg and proved by Robert Osserman in 1959, in this form Bernstein's theorem can be generalized to say that the image of the Gauss map of a complete immersed minimal surface in R^{3} either consists of a single point or is dense within the sphere.

Osserman's theorem was improved by Frederico Xavier and Hirotaka Fujimoto in the 1980s. They proved that if the image of the Gauss map of a complete immersed minimal surface in R^{3} omits more than four points of the sphere, then the surface is a plane. This is optimal, since it was shown by Konrad Voss in the 1960s that for any subset A of the sphere whose complement consists of zero, one, two, three, or four points, there exists a complete immersed minimal surface in R^{3} whose Gauss map has image A. Particular examples include Riemann's minimal surface, whose Gauss map is surjective, the Enneper surface, whose Gauss map omits one point, the catenoid and helicoid, whose Gauss maps omit two points, and Scherk's first surface, whose Gauss map omits four points.

It is also possible to study the Gauss map of minimal surfaces of higher codimension in higher-dimensional Euclidean spaces. There are a number of variants of the results of Osserman, Xavier, and Fujimoto which can be studied in this setting.

== Sources ==
- Chen, Bang-yen (2000). "Riemannian submanifolds". In Dillen, F. J. E.; Verstraelen, L. C. A. (eds.). Handbook of Differential Geometry, Volume I. Handbook of Differential Geometry. Vol. 1. Amsterdam: North-Holland. pp. 187–418. arXiv:1307.1875. doi:10.1016/S1874-5741(00)80006-0. ISBN 978-0-444-82240-6. MR 1736854. Zbl 0968.53002.
- Dierkes, U.; Hildebrandt, S.; Küster, A.; Wohlrab, O. (1992). "Minimal Surfaces". Minimal surfaces I. Grundlehren der mathematischen Wissenschaften. Vol. 295. Berlin, Heidelberg: Springer-Verlag. pp. 53–88. doi:10.1007/978-3-662-02791-2_3. ISBN 978-3-662-02793-6. MR 1215267. Zbl 0777.53012.
- Lawson, H. Blaine Jr. (1980). Lectures on minimal submanifolds. Vol. I. Mathematics Lecture Series. Vol. 9 (Second edition of 1977 original ed.). Wilmington, DE: Publish or Perish, Inc. ISBN 0-914098-18-7. MR 0576752. Zbl 0434.53006.
- Nitsche, Johannes C. C. (1965). "On new results in the theory of minimal surfaces" (PDF). Bulletin of the American Mathematical Society. 71 (2): 195–270. doi:10.1090/S0002-9904-1965-11276-9. MR 0173993. Zbl 0135.21701.
- Osserman, Robert (1986). A survey of minimal surfaces (Second edition of 1969 original ed.). New York: Dover Publications, Inc. ISBN 0-486-64998-9. MR 0852409. Zbl 0209.52901.
- Yau, Shing-Tung (1993). "Open problems in geometry". In Greene, Robert; Yau, S. T. (eds.). Differential Geometry: Partial Differential Equations on Manifolds. American Mathematical Society Summer Institute on Differential Geometry (University of California, Los Angeles, July 9–27, 1990). Proceedings of Symposia in Pure Mathematics. Vol. 54. Providence, RI: American Mathematical Society. pp. 1–28. doi:10.1090/pspum/054.1. ISBN 978-0-8218-1494-9. MR 1216573. Zbl 0801.53001.
