= Osserman manifold =

Type of Riemannian manifold with constant Jacobi operator spectrum

In mathematics, particularly in differential geometry, an Osserman manifold is a Riemannian manifold in which the characteristic polynomial of the Jacobi operator of unit tangent vectors is a constant on the unit tangent bundle. It is named after American mathematician Robert Osserman.

== Definition ==
Let $M^n$ be a Riemannian manifold. For a point $p \in M^n$ and a unit vector $X \in T_pM^n$, the Jacobi operator $R_X$ is defined by $R_X = R(X,\cdot)X$, where $R$ is the Riemann curvature tensor. A manifold $M^n$ is called pointwise Osserman if, for every $p \in M^n$, the spectrum of the Jacobi operator does not depend on the choice of the unit vector $X$. The manifold is called globally Osserman if the spectrum depends neither on $X$ nor on $p$. All two-point homogeneous spaces are globally Osserman, including Euclidean spaces $\mathbb{R}^n$, real projective spaces $\mathbb{RP}^n$, spheres $\mathbb{S}^n$, hyperbolic spaces $\mathbb{H}^n$, complex projective spaces $\mathbb{CP}^n$, complex hyperbolic spaces $\mathbb{CH}^n$, quaternionic projective spaces $\mathbb{HP}^n$, quaternionic hyperbolic spaces $\mathbb{HH}^n$, the Cayley projective plane $\mathbb{C}ayP^2$, and the Cayley hyperbolic plane $\mathbb{C}ayH^2$.

== Properties ==
Clifford structures are fundamental in studying Osserman manifolds. An algebraic curvature tensor $R$ in $\mathbb{R}^n$ has a $\text{Cliff}(\nu)$-structure if it can be expressed as

$$R(X,Y)Z = \lambda_0(\langle X,Z \rangle Y - \langle Y,Z \rangle X) + \sum_{i=1}^{\nu} \frac{1}{3}(\lambda_i - \lambda_0)(2\langle J_iX,Y \rangle J_iZ + \langle J_iZ,Y \rangle J_iX - \langle J_iZ,X \rangle J_iY)$$

where $J_i$ are skew-symmetric orthogonal operators satisfying the Hurwitz relations $J_iJ_j + J_jJ_i = -2\delta_{ij}I$. A Riemannian manifold is said to have $\text{Cliff}(\nu)$-structure if its curvature tensor also does. These structures naturally arise from unitary representations of Clifford algebras and provide a way to construct examples of Osserman manifolds. The study of Osserman manifolds has connections to isospectral geometry, Einstein manifolds, curvature operators in differential geometry, and the classification of symmetric spaces.

== Osserman conjecture ==
Unsolved problem in mathematics
Are all Osserman manifolds either flat or locally rank-one symmetric spaces?
More unsolved problems in mathematics

The Osserman conjecture asks whether every Osserman manifold is either a flat manifold or locally a rank-one symmetric space.

Considerable progress has been made on this conjecture, with proofs established for manifolds of dimension $n$ where $n$ is not divisible by 4 or $n = 4$. For pointwise Osserman manifolds, the conjecture holds in dimensions $n \neq 2$ not divisible by 4. The case of manifolds with exactly two eigenvalues of the Jacobi operator has been extensively studied, with the conjecture proven except for specific cases in dimension 16.

== See also ==
- Clifford algebra
- List of unsolved problems in mathematics
