= Richard Schoen =

American mathematician (born 1950)

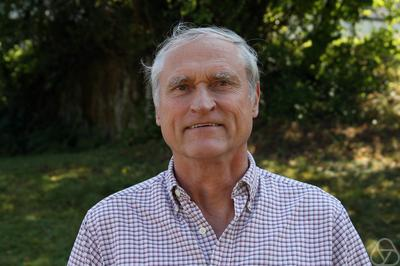
- Schoen in 2015
- Born: October 23, 1950 (age 76); Fort Recovery, Ohio, U.S.
- Education: University of Dayton (BSc.); Stanford University (Ph.D.)
- Known for: Differentiable sphere theorem; Geometry of positive scalar curvature; Positive mass theorem; Geometry and regularity theory of harmonic maps and stable minimal hypersurfaces; Yamabe problem
- Spouse: Doris Fischer-Colbrie
- Awards: NSF Graduate Research Fellowship Program (1972); Sloan Research Fellowship (1979); MacArthur Fellowship (1983); American Academy of Arts and Sciences (1988); Bôcher Memorial Prize (1989); National Academy of Sciences (1991); Fellow of the AAAS (1995); Guggenheim Fellowship (1996); Fellow of the AMS (2012); Dean's Teaching Award, Stanford University (2014–15); Honorary Doctor of Science, University of Warwick (2015); Wolf Prize (2017); Heinz Hopf Prize (2017); Lobachevsky Medal and Prize (2017); Rolf Schock Prize (2017)
- Scientific career
- Fields: Mathematics
- Workplaces: Courant Institute, NYU; Stanford University; University of California, Berkeley; University of California, Irvine; University of California, San Diego
- Thesis: Existence and Regularity Theorems for some Geometric Variational Problems
- Doctoral advisor: Leon Simon; Shing-Tung Yau
- Doctoral students: Hubert Bray; José F. Escobar; Ailana Fraser; Lan-Hsuan Huang; Chikako Mese; William Minicozzi; André Neves

Richard Melvin Schoen (born October 23, 1950) is an American mathematician known for his work in differential geometry and geometric analysis. He is best known for the resolution of the Yamabe problem in 1984 and his works on harmonic maps.

== Early life and education ==
Schoen was born in Celina, Ohio, on October 23, 1950. In 1968, he graduated from Fort Recovery High School. He received his B.S. from the University of Dayton in mathematics. He then received his PhD in 1977 from Stanford University with Leon Simon and Shing-Tung Yau as advisors.

== Career ==
After faculty positions at the Courant Institute, NYU, University of California, Berkeley, and University of California, San Diego, he was Professor at Stanford University from 1987 to 2014, as Bass Professor of Humanities and Sciences since 1992. He is currently Distinguished Professor and Excellence in Teaching Chair at the University of California, Irvine. His surname is pronounced "Shane."

Schoen received an NSF Graduate Research Fellowship in 1972 and a Sloan Research Fellowship in 1979. Schoen is a 1983 MacArthur Fellow. He has been invited to speak at the International Congress of Mathematicians (ICM) three times, including twice as a Plenary Speaker. In 1983 he was an Invited Speaker at the ICM in Warsaw, in 1986 he was a Plenary Speaker at the ICM in Berkeley, and in 2010 he was a Plenary Speaker at the ICM in Hyderabad. For his work on the Yamabe problem, Schoen was awarded the Bôcher Memorial Prize in 1989.

In 1988, he was elected to the American Academy of Arts and Sciences and to the National Academy of Sciences in 1991, became Fellow of the American Association for the Advancement of Science in 1995, and won a Guggenheim Fellowship in 1996. In 2012 he became a Fellow of the American Mathematical Society. He received the 2014–15 Dean's Award for Lifetime Achievements in Teaching from Stanford University. In 2015, he was elected vice president of the American Mathematical Society. He was awarded an Honorary Doctor of Science from the University of Warwick in 2015. He received the Wolf Prize in Mathematics for 2017, shared with Charles Fefferman. In the same year, he was awarded the Heinz Hopf Prize, the Lobachevsky Medal and Prize by Kazan Federal University, and the Rolf Schock Prize.

He has had over 44 doctoral students, including Hubert Bray, José F. Escobar, Ailana Fraser, Chikako Mese, William Minicozzi, and André Neves.

Schoen has investigated the use of analytic techniques in global differential geometry, with a number of fundamental contributions to the regularity theory of minimal surfaces and harmonic maps.

=== Harmonic maps ===
In 1976, Schoen and Shing-Tung Yau used Yau's earlier Liouville theorems to extend the rigidity phenomena found earlier by James Eells and Joseph Sampson to noncompact settings. By identifying a certain interplay of the Bochner identity for harmonic maps together with the second variation of area formula for minimal hypersurfaces, they also identified some novel conditions on the domain leading to the same conclusion. These rigidity theorems are complemented by their existence theorem for harmonic maps on noncompact domains, as a simple corollary of Richard Hamilton's resolution of the Dirichlet boundary-value problem. As a consequence they found some striking geometric results, such as that certain noncompact manifolds do not admit any complete metrics of nonnegative Ricci curvature.

In two papers from the 1980s, Schoen and Karen Uhlenbeck made a foundational contribution to the regularity theory of energy-minimizing harmonic maps. The techniques they developed, making extensive use of monotonicity formulas, have been very influential in the field of geometric analysis and have been adapted to a number of other problems. Fundamental conclusions of theirs include compactness theorems for sets of harmonic maps and control over the size of corresponding singular sets. Leon Simon applied such results to obtain a clear picture of the small-scale geometry of energy-minimizing harmonic maps.

Later, Mikhael Gromov had the insight that an extension of the theory of harmonic maps, to allow values in metric spaces rather than Riemannian manifolds, would have a number of significant applications, with analogues of the classical Eells−Sampson rigidity theorem giving novel rigidity theorems for lattices. The intense analytical details of such a theory were worked out by Schoen. Further foundations of this new context for harmonic maps were laid out by Schoen and Nicholas Korevaar.

=== Minimal surfaces, positive scalar curvature, and the positive mass theorem ===
In 1979, Schoen and his former doctoral supervisor, Shing-Tung Yau, made a number of highly influential contributions to the study of positive scalar curvature. By an elementary but novel combination of the Gauss equation, the formula for second variation of area, and the Gauss-Bonnet theorem, Schoen and Yau were able to rule out the existence of several types of stable minimal surfaces in three-dimensional manifolds of positive scalar curvature. By contrasting this result with an analytically deep theorem of theirs establishing the existence of such surfaces, they were able to achieve constraints on which manifolds can admit a metric of positive scalar curvature. Schoen and Doris Fischer-Colbrie later undertook a broader study of stable minimal surfaces in 3-dimensional manifolds, using instead an analysis of the stability operator and its spectral properties.

An inductive argument based upon the existence of stable minimal hypersurfaces allowed them to extend their results to higher dimensions. Further analytic techniques facilitated the application of topological surgeries on manifolds which admit metrics of positive scalar curvature, showing that the class of such manifolds is topologically rich. Mikhael Gromov and H. Blaine Lawson obtained similar results by other methods, also undertaking a deeper analysis of topological consequences.

By an extension of their techniques to noncompact manifolds, Schoen and Yau were able to settle the important Riemannian case of the positive mass theorem in general relativity, which can be viewed as a statement about the geometric behavior near infinity of noncompact manifolds with positive scalar curvature. Like their original results, the argument is based upon contradiction. A more constructive argument, using the theory of harmonic spinors instead of minimal hypersurfaces, was later found by Edward Witten.

Schoen, Yau, and Leon Simon identified a simple combination of the Simons formula with the formula for second variation of area which yields important curvature estimates for stable minimal hypersurfaces of low dimensions. In 1983, Schoen obtained similar estimates in the special case of two-dimensional surfaces, making use of the existence of isothermal coordinates. Slightly weaker estimates were obtained by Schoen and Simon, although without any dimensional restriction. Fundamental consequences of the Schoen−Simon estimates include compactness theorems for stable minimal hypersurfaces as well as control over the size of "singular sets." In particular, the Schoen−Simon estimates are an important tool in the Almgren–Pitts min-max theory, which has found a number of applications.

The possible presence of singular sets restricts the dimensions in which Schoen and Yau's inductive arguments can be easily carried out. Meanwhile, Witten's essential use of spinors restricts his results to topologically special cases. Thus the general case of the positive mass theorem in higher dimensions was left as a major open problem in Schoen and Yau's 1979 work. In 1988, they settled the problem in arbitrary dimension in the special case that the Weyl tensor is zero; this has been significant in conformal geometry. In 2017, they released a preprint claiming the general case, in which they deal directly with the singular sets of minimal hypersurfaces.

=== Yamabe problem and conformal geometry ===
In 1960, Hidehiko Yamabe introduced the "Yamabe functional" on a conformal class of Riemannian metrics and demonstrated that a critical point would have constant scalar curvature. He made partial progress towards proving that critical points must exist, which was taken further by Neil Trudinger and Thierry Aubin. Aubin's work, in particular, settled the cases of high dimension or when there exists a point where the Weyl tensor is nonzero. In 1984, Schoen settled the cases left open by Aubin's work, the decisive point of which rescaled the metric by the Green's function of the Laplace-Beltrami operator. This allowed an application of Schoen and Yau's positive mass theorem to the resulting metric, giving important asymptotic information about the original metric. The works of Yamabe, Trudinger, Aubin, and Schoen together comprise the solution of the Yamabe problem, which asserts that there is a metric of constant scalar curvature in every conformal class.

In 1989, Schoen was also able to adapt Karen Uhlenbeck's bubbling analysis, developed for other geometric-analytic problems, to the setting of constant scalar curvature. The uniqueness of critical points of the Yamabe functional, and more generally the compactness of the set of all critical points, is a subtle question first investigated by Schoen in 1991. Fuller results were later obtained by Simon Brendle, Marcus Khuri, Fernando Codá Marques, and Schoen.

=== Differentiable sphere theorem ===
In the 1980s, Richard Hamilton introduced the Ricci flow and proved a number of convergence results, most notably for two- and three-dimensional spaces. Although he and others found partial results in high dimensions, progress was stymied by the difficulty of understanding the complicated Riemann curvature tensor. Simon Brendle and Schoen were able to prove that the positivity of Mario Micallef and John Moore's "isotropic curvature" is preserved by the Ricci flow in any dimension, a fact independently proven by Huy Nguyen. Brendle and Schoen were further able to relate their positivity condition to the positivity of sectional curvature and of curvature operator, which allowed them to exploit then-recent algebraic ideas of Christoph Böhm and Burkhard Wilking, thereby obtaining a new convergence theorem for Ricci flow. A special case of their convergence theorem has the differentiable sphere theorem as a simple corollary, which had been a well-known conjecture in the study of positive sectional curvature for the past fifty years.

== Selected publications ==
- Schoen, R.; Simon, L.; Yau, S. T. (1975). "Curvature estimates for minimal hypersurfaces". Acta Mathematica. 134 (3–4): 275–288. doi:10.1007/BF02392104. MR 0423263. Zbl 0323.53039.
- Schoen, Richard; Yau, Shing Tung (1976). "Harmonic maps and the topology of stable hypersurfaces and manifolds with non-negative Ricci curvature". Commentarii Mathematici Helvetici. 51 (3): 333–341. doi:10.1007/BF02568161. MR 0438388. S2CID 120845708. Zbl 0361.53040.
- Schoen, R.; Yau, Shing Tung (1979). "Existence of incompressible minimal surfaces and the topology of three-dimensional manifolds with nonnegative scalar curvature". Annals of Mathematics. Second Series. 110 (1): 127–142. doi:10.2307/1971247. JSTOR 1971247. MR 0541332. S2CID 118216230. Zbl 0431.53051.
- Schoen, R.; Yau, S. T. (1979). "On the structure of manifolds with positive scalar curvature". Manuscripta Mathematica. 28 (1–3): 159–183. doi:10.1007/BF01647970. MR 0535700. S2CID 121008386. Zbl 0423.53032.
- Schoen, Richard; Yau, Shing Tung (1979). "On the proof of the positive mass conjecture in general relativity". Communications in Mathematical Physics. 65 (1): 45–76. Bibcode:1979CMaPh..65...45S. doi:10.1007/BF01940959. MR 0526976. S2CID 54217085. Zbl 0405.53045.
- Fischer-Colbrie, Doris; Schoen, Richard (1980). "The structure of complete stable minimal surfaces in 3-manifolds of nonnegative scalar curvature". Communications on Pure and Applied Mathematics. 33 (2): 199–211. doi:10.1002/cpa.3160330206. MR 0562550. Zbl 0439.53060.
- Schoen, Richard; Simon, Leon (1981). "Regularity of stable minimal hypersurfaces". Communications on Pure and Applied Mathematics. 34 (6): 741–797. doi:10.1002/cpa.3160340603. MR 0634285. S2CID 124924186. Zbl 0497.49034.
- Schoen, Richard; Yau, Shing Tung (1981). "Proof of the positive mass theorem. II". Communications in Mathematical Physics. 79 (2): 231–260. Bibcode:1981CMaPh..79..231S. doi:10.1007/BF01942062. MR 0612249. S2CID 59473203. Zbl 0494.53028.
- Schoen, Richard; Uhlenbeck, Karen (1982). "A regularity theory for harmonic maps". Journal of Differential Geometry. 17 (2): 307–335. doi:10.4310/jdg/1214436923. MR 0664498. Zbl 0521.58021. (Erratum: doi:10.4310/jdg/1214437667)
- Schoen, Richard (1983). "Estimates for stable minimal surfaces in three-dimensional manifolds". In Bombieri, Enrico (ed.). Seminar on minimal submanifolds. Annals of Mathematics Studies. Vol. 103. Princeton, NJ: Princeton University Press. pp. 111–126. doi:10.1515/9781400881437-006. ISBN 0-691-08324-X. MR 0795231. S2CID 118467538. Zbl 0532.53042.
- Schoen, Richard; Uhlenbeck, Karen (1983). "Boundary regularity and the Dirichlet problem for harmonic maps". Journal of Differential Geometry. 18 (2): 253–268. doi:10.4310/jdg/1214437663. MR 0710054. Zbl 0547.58020.
- Schoen, Richard (1984). "Conformal deformation of a Riemannian metric to constant scalar curvature". Journal of Differential Geometry. 20 (2): 479–495. doi:10.4310/jdg/1214439291. MR 0788292. Zbl 0576.53028.
- Schoen, Richard M. (1984). "Analytic aspects of the harmonic map problem". In Chern, S. S. (ed.). Seminar on nonlinear partial differential equations. Seminar held at the Mathematical Sciences Research Institute, Berkeley, CA, May 9, 1983. Mathematical Sciences Research Institute Publications. Vol. 2. New York: Springer-Verlag. pp. 321–358. doi:10.1007/978-1-4612-1110-5_17. ISBN 0-387-96079-1. MR 0765241. S2CID 118833790. Zbl 0551.58011.
- Schoen, R.; Yau, S.-T. (1988). "Conformally flat manifolds, Kleinian groups and scalar curvature". Inventiones Mathematicae. 92 (1): 47–71. Bibcode:1988InMat..92...47S. doi:10.1007/BF01393992. MR 0931204. S2CID 59029712. Zbl 0658.53038.
- Schoen, Richard M. (1989). "Variational theory for the total scalar curvature functional for Riemannian metrics and related topics". In Giaquinta, M. (ed.). Topics in calculus of variations. Second C.I.M.E. Session held in Montecatini Terme, July 20–28, 1987. Lecture Notes in Mathematics. Vol. 1365. Berlin: Springer. pp. 120–154. doi:10.1007/BFb0089180. ISBN 3-540-50727-2. MR 0994021. Zbl 0702.49038.
- Schoen, Richard M. (1991). "On the number of constant scalar curvature metrics in a conformal class". In Lawson, Blaine; Tenenblat, Keti (eds.). Differential geometry. A symposium in honor of Manfredo do Carmo. Pitman Monographs and Surveys in Pure and Applied Mathematics. Vol. 52. Harlow: Longman Scientific and Technical. pp. 311–320. ISBN 0-582-05590-3. MR 1173050. Zbl 0733.53021.
- Gromov, Mikhail; Schoen, Richard (1992). "Harmonic maps into singular spaces and p-adic superrigidity for lattices in groups of rank one". Publications Mathématiques de l'Institut des Hautes Études Scientifiques. 76: 165–246. doi:10.1007/bf02699433. MR 1215595. S2CID 118023776. Zbl 0896.58024.
- Korevaar, Nicholas J.; Schoen, Richard M. (1993). "Sobolev spaces and harmonic maps for metric space targets". Communications in Analysis and Geometry. 1 (3–4): 561–659. doi:10.4310/CAG.1993.v1.n4.a4. MR 1266480. Zbl 0862.58004.
- Brendle, Simon; Schoen, Richard (2009). "Manifolds with 1/4-pinched curvature are space forms". Journal of the American Mathematical Society. 22 (1): 287–307. arXiv:0705.0766. Bibcode:2009JAMS...22..287B. doi:10.1090/s0894-0347-08-00613-9. MR 2449060. Zbl 1251.53021.

Textbooks

- Schoen, R.; Yau, S.-T. (1994). Lectures on differential geometry. Conference Proceedings and Lecture Notes in Geometry and Topology. Vol. 1. Lecture notes prepared by Wei Yue Ding, Kung Ching Chang, Jia Qing Zhong and Yi Chao Xu. Translated from the Chinese by Ding and S. Y. Cheng. Preface translated from the Chinese by Kaising Tso. Cambridge, MA: International Press. ISBN 1-57146-012-8. MR 1333601. Zbl 0830.53001.
- Schoen, R.; Yau, S. T. (1997). Lectures on harmonic maps. Conference Proceedings and Lecture Notes in Geometry and Topology. Vol. 2. Cambridge, MA: International Press. ISBN 1-57146-002-0. MR 1474501. Zbl 0886.53004.

== See also ==
- Almgren–Pitts min-max theory
- Harmonic map
- Sphere theorem
