= Keller–Osserman conditions =

In differential geometry and partial differential equations, the Keller–Osserman conditions are conditions on a single-variable function f that preclude the existence of solutions to the elliptic partial differential equation (PDE)
$$\Delta u=f(u).$$
In particular, the fast growth and monotonicity of f is incompatible with the existence of global solutions. For example, the conditions imply that there is no twice-differentiable function $u: \R^n \to \R$ such that
$$\frac{\partial^2u}{\partial x_1^2}+\cdots+\frac{\partial^2u}{\partial x_n^2}\geq e^u.$$
They were found independently in 1957 by Joseph Keller and Robert Osserman.

== Motivation, applications and generalization ==
Keller's motivation for this problem was based in application to electrohydrodynamics. Osserman's motivation, by contrast, was from differential geometry, with the observation that the scalar curvature of the Riemannian metric e^{2u}(dx^{2} + dy^{2}) on the plane is given by

$$-e^{-2u}\Big(\frac{\partial^2u}{\partial x^2}+\frac{\partial^2u}{\partial y^2}\Big).$$

An application of Osserman's non-existence theorem then shows that any simply-connected two-dimensional smooth Riemannian manifold whose scalar curvature is negative and bounded away from zero is not conformally equivalent to the standard plane.

Osserman's method was to construct special solutions of the PDE which would facilitate application of the maximum principle. In particular, he showed that for any real number a there exists a rotationally symmetric solution on some ball which takes the value a at the center and diverges to infinity near the boundary. The maximum principle shows, by the monotonicity of f, that a hypothetical global solution u would satisfy u(x) < a for any x and any a, which is impossible.

By a different maximum principle-based method, Shiu-Yuen Cheng and Shing-Tung Yau generalized the Keller–Osserman non-existence result, in part by a generalization to the setting of a Riemannian manifold. This was, in turn, an important piece of one of their resolutions of the Calabi–Jörgens problem on rigidity of affine hyperspheres with nonnegative mean curvature.
