= Doris Fischer-Colbrie =

US ceramic artist and former mathematician

Doris Helga Fischer-Colbrie (born in 1949) is a ceramic artist and former mathematician. She received her Ph.D. in mathematics in 1978 from University of California at Berkeley, where her advisor was H. Blaine Lawson.

Many of her contributions to the theory of minimal surfaces are now considered foundational to the field. In particular, her collaboration with Richard Schoen is a landmark contribution to the interaction of stable minimal surfaces with nonnegative scalar curvature. A particular result, also obtained by Manfredo do Carmo and Chiakuei Peng, is that the only complete stable minimal surfaces in ℝ^{3} are planes. Her work on unstable minimal surfaces gave the basic tools by which to relate the assumption of finite index to conditions on stable subdomains and total curvature.

After positions at Columbia University and San Diego State University, Fischer-Colbrie left academia to become a ceramic artist. She is married to Schoen, with whom she has two children.

== Publication list ==
- Fischer-Colbrie, D. (1980). "Some rigidity theorems for minimal submanifolds of the sphere". Acta Mathematica. 145 (1–2): 29–46. doi:10.1007/BF02414184. MR 0558091. Zbl 0464.53047.
- Fischer-Colbrie, Doris; Schoen, Richard (1980). "The structure of complete stable minimal surfaces in 3-manifolds of nonnegative scalar curvature". Communications on Pure and Applied Mathematics. 33 (2): 199–211. doi:10.1002/cpa.3160330206. MR 0562550. Zbl 0439.53060.
- Fischer-Colbrie, D. (1985). "On complete minimal surfaces with finite Morse index in three-manifolds". Inventiones Mathematicae. 82 (1): 121–132. doi:10.1007/BF01394782. MR 0808112. Zbl 0573.53038.
