= Calabi–Eckmann manifold =

In complex geometry, a part of mathematics, a Calabi–Eckmann manifold (or, often, Calabi–Eckmann space), named after Eugenio Calabi and Beno Eckmann, is a complex, homogeneous, non-Kähler manifold, homeomorphic to a product of two odd-dimensional spheres of dimension ≥ 3.

The Calabi–Eckmann manifold is constructed as follows. Consider the space ${\mathbb C}^n\backslash \{0\} \times {\mathbb C}^m\backslash \{0\}$, where $m,n>1$, equipped with an action of the group ${\mathbb C}$:

$$t\in {\mathbb C}, \ (x,y)\in {\mathbb C}^n\backslash \{0\} \times {\mathbb C}^m\backslash \{0\} \mid  t(x,y)= (e^tx, e^{\alpha t}y)$$

where $\alpha\in {\mathbb C}\backslash {\mathbb R}$ is a fixed complex number. It is easy to check that this action is free and proper, and the corresponding orbit space M is homeomorphic to $S^{2n-1}\times S^{2m-1}$. Since M is a quotient space of a holomorphic action, it is also a complex manifold. It is obviously homogeneous, with a transitive holomorphic action of $\operatorname{GL}(n,{\mathbb C}) \times \operatorname{GL}(m, {\mathbb C})$

A Calabi–Eckmann manifold M is non-Kähler, because $H^2(M)=0$. It is the simplest example of a non-Kähler manifold which is simply connected (in dimension 2, all simply connected compact complex manifolds are Kähler).

The natural projection

$${\mathbb C}^n\backslash \{0\} \times {\mathbb C}^m\backslash \{0\}\mapsto {\mathbb C}P^{n-1}\times {\mathbb C}P^{m-1}$$

induces a holomorphic map from the corresponding Calabi–Eckmann manifold M to ${\mathbb C}P^{n-1}\times {\mathbb C}P^{m-1}$. The fiber of this map is an elliptic curve T, obtained as a quotient of $\mathbb C$ by the lattice ${\mathbb Z} + \alpha\cdot {\mathbb Z}$. This makes M into a principal T-bundle.

Calabi and Eckmann discovered these manifolds in 1953.
