= David W. McLaughlin =

Applied mathematician and academic administrator

- Born: October 11, 1944 (age 81)
- Education: Creighton University; Indiana University Bloomington
- Known for: Nonlinear waves Complex nonlinear systems Visual cortex modeling
- Awards: Member, National Academy of Sciences (2002); Fellow, American Academy of Arts and Sciences (2000); Fellow, American Association for the Advancement of Science; Fellow, Society for Industrial and Applied Mathematics
- Scientific career
- Fields: Applied mathematics Mathematical physics Neural science
- Workplaces: New York University; Iowa State University; University of Arizona; Princeton University

David Warren McLaughlin (born October 11, 1944) is an applied mathematician and academic administrator whose work concerns nonlinear systems, nonlinear waves, and mathematical models of visual neuroscience. McLaughlin served as the provost of New York University from 2002 to 2016.

== Early life and education ==
McLaughlin grew up in Woodbine, Iowa, where his father sold gas to farmers. He attended Creighton University in Omaha, Nebraska, majoring in physics and mathematics and graduating summa cum laude in 1966. McLaughlin went on to graduate study at Indiana University (Bloomington) where he studied theoretical physics with Larry Schulman, completing a Ph.D. in physics in 1971.

== Career ==
McLaughlin moved several times within a few years at the beginning of his career. He first joined New York University in 1971 as an assistant professor in mathematics, recruited by Joseph Keller, but had to leave in 1972 when NYU's University Heights campus in the Bronx was sold due to financial problems. He next moved to Iowa State University in 1972, again as an assistant professor of mathematics, and then joined the University of Arizona as associate professor in 1974. He served on the faculty at the University of Arizona for 15 years, during which time he was the chair of the applied mathematics program.

In 1989, McLaughlin joined Princeton University as professor of mathematics, where he directed the applied and computational mathematics program before returning to NYU in 1994 as director of the Courant Institute of Mathematical Sciences. At Courant, he led efforts in mathematics, applied mathematics, computational science, and computer science, recruiting faculty in these areas and developing programs in atmosphere-ocean studies, financial mathematics, multimedia technology, and computational biology. He was appointed the provost of NYU in 2002, serving in that role for 14 years.. He is currently the Silver Professor of Mathematics and Neural Science at the Courant Institute.

== Research ==
McLaughlin's work was applied mathematics focused on large-scale nonlinear systems best described by partial differential equations, with a long interest in mathematical models of complex systems. His research areas included nonlinear waves, laser beams, and in recent years, neuronal networks for visual neural science. His early research used asymptotic methods applied to path integrals and the nonlinear Schrödinger equation. His major work was on nonlinear dispersive waves, including systems where wave dissipation is weak, and his work addressed coherent behavior, chaotic behavior, and dispersive wave turbulence.

After returning to the Courant, he developed an interest in neuroscience; he collaborated with Robert Shapley at NYU’s Center for Neural Science, working at the intersection of mathematics and neuroscience. With a focus on visual neuroscience, McLaughlin developed large-scale computational models of the front end of the cortical visual system, particularly the primary visual cortex.

== Honors and awards ==
- Member, National Academy of Sciences (2002).
- Fellow, American Academy of Arts and Sciences (2000).
- Fellow, American Association for the Advancement of Science (2003).
- Fellow, Society for Industrial and Applied Mathematics
