= Ailana Fraser =

Canadian mathematician

Ailana Margaret Fraser
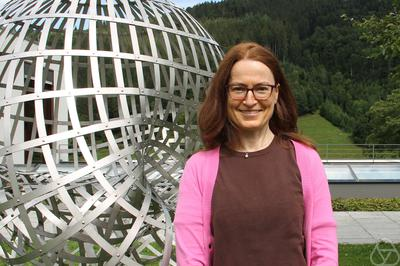
- Fraser at Oberwolfach in 2025
- Born: Toronto, Ontario, Canada
- Occupation: Professor of Mathematics
- Father: Donald A. S. Fraser

Academic background
- Education: Stanford University

Academic work
- Discipline: Mathematics, Geometric Analysis
- Institutions: University of British Columbia

Ailana Margaret Fraser is a Canadian mathematician and professor of mathematics at the University of British Columbia. She is known for her work in geometric analysis and the theory of minimal surfaces. Her research is particularly focused on extremal eigenvalue problems and sharp eigenvalue estimates for surfaces, min-max minimal surface theory, free boundary minimal surfaces, and positive isotropic curvature.

== Early life and education ==
Fraser was born in Toronto, Ontario. She received her Ph.D. from Stanford University in 1998 under the supervision of Richard Schoen. After postdoctoral studies at the Courant Institute of New York University, she taught at Brown University before moving to UBC.

== Major work ==
Fraser is well-known for her 2011 work with Schoen on the first "Steklov eigenvalue" of a compact Riemannian manifold-with-boundary. This is defined as the minimal nonzero eigenvalue of the "Dirichlet to Neumann" operator which sends a function on the boundary to the normal derivative of its harmonic extension into the interior. In the two-dimensional case, Fraser and Schoen were able to adapt Paul Yang and Shing-Tung Yau's use of the Hersch trick in order to approximate the product of the first Steklov eigenvalue with the length of the boundary from above, by topological data.

Under an ansatz of rotational symmetry, Fraser and Schoen carefully analyzed the case of an annulus, showing that the metric optimizing the above eigenvalue-length product is obtained as the intrinsic geometry of a geometrically meaningful part of the catenoid. By use of the uniformization theorem for surfaces with boundary, they were able to remove the condition of rotational symmetry, replacing it by certain weaker conditions; however, they conjectured that their result should be unconditional.

In general dimensions, Fraser and Schoen developed a "boundary" version of Peter Li and Yau's "conformal volume." By building upon some of Li and Yau's arguments, they gave lower bounds for the first Steklov eigenvalue in terms of conformal volumes, in addition to isoperimetric inequalities for certain minimal surfaces of the unit ball.

== Awards and honors ==
Fraser won the Krieger–Nelson Prize of the Canadian Mathematical Society in 2012 and became a fellow of the American Mathematical Society in 2013. In 2018 the Canadian Mathematical Society listed her in their inaugural class of fellows and in 2021 awarded her, along with Marco Gualtieri, the Cathleen Synge Morawetz Prize. In 2022 she was awarded a Simons Fellowship.

== Personal life ==
Fraser is the daughter of statistician Donald A. S. Fraser.

== Major publications ==
- Fraser, Ailana; Schoen, Richard (2011). "The first Steklov eigenvalue, conformal geometry, and minimal surfaces". Advances in Mathematics. 226 (5): 4011–4030. arXiv:0912.5392. doi:10.1016/j.aim.2010.11.007. MR 2770439. Zbl 1215.53052.
- Fraser, Ailana; Schoen, Richard (2016). "Sharp eigenvalue bounds and minimal surfaces in the ball". Inventiones Mathematicae. 203 (3): 823–890. arXiv:1209.3789. Bibcode:2016InMat.203..823F. doi:10.1007/s00222-015-0604-x. MR 3461367. S2CID 119615775. Zbl 1337.35099.
