= Eugene Isaacson =

American mathematician

Eugene Isaacson (1919–2008), was a US mathematician who pioneered modern numerical analysis. He was a mathematics and physics graduate of City College in New York, he then entered the graduate program in mathematics at New York University under the supervision of Kurt Otto Friedrichs, gaining a PhD on water waves on sloping beaches in 1949. His academic career was then spent at the Courant Institute until his retirement.

Despite an initial interest in topology, Isaacson worked for most of his career in applied and computational mathematics and is best known for his work on the numerical solution of differential equations. His book with Herbert Keller Analysis of Numerical Methods was a leading textbook at the time.

He served as editor for Mathematics of Computation and the SIAM Journal on Numerical Analysis.

A special issue of Mathematics of Computation was published in 1989 to celebrate his 70th birthday. The contributors included his sons David and Eli Isaacson, also mathematicians, who wrote a paper together for this volume. The paper is dedicated to their father and their mother Muriel "for making this collaboration possible".
