= Robert Miller Hardt =

American mathematician (born 1945)

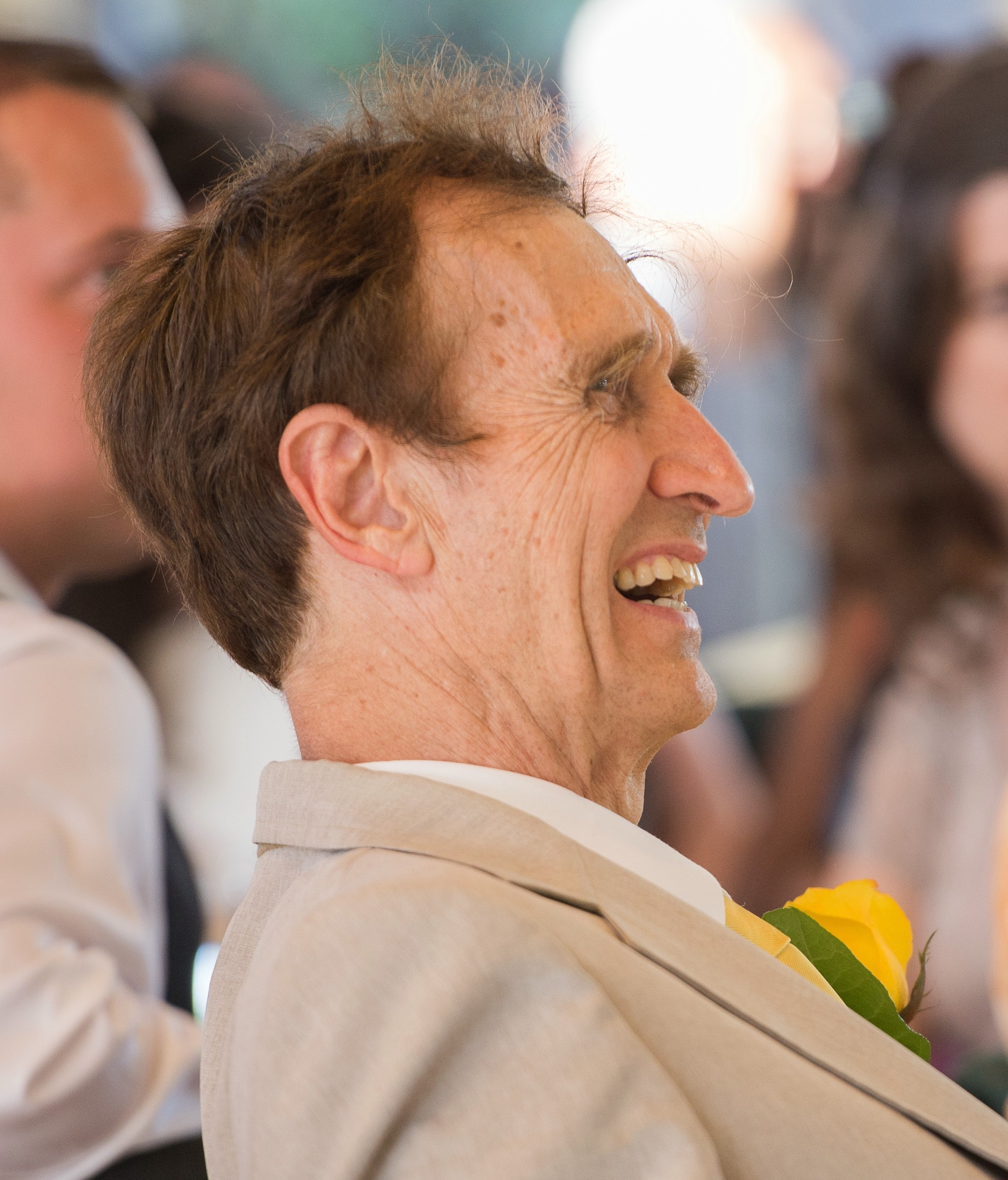
- Hardt in 2014
- Born: June 24, 1945 (age 80); Pittsburgh, Pennsylvania, U.S.
- Education: Massachusetts Institute of Technology; Brown University (PhD)
- Occupation: Mathematician

Robert Miller Hardt (born June 24, 1945, Pittsburgh) is an American mathematician. His research deals with geometric measure theory, partial differential equations, and continuum mechanics. He is particularly known for his work with Leon Simon proving the boundary regularity of volume minimizing hypersurfaces.

Hardt received in 1967 his bachelor's degree from Massachusetts Institute of Technology and in 1971 his Ph.D. from Brown University under Herbert Federer with thesis Slicing and Intersection Theory for Chains Associated with Real Analytic Varieties. In 1971 he became an instructor and later a professor at the University of Minnesota. In 1988 he became a professor at Rice University, where he is W. L. Moody Professor. His doctoral students include Fang-Hua Lin.

Hardt was a visiting scholar at the Institute for Advanced Study in 1976 and at IHES in 1978 and 1981. He was a visiting professor at the University of Melbourne in 1979, at Stanford University and at the University of Wuppertal.

In 1986 Hardt was an Invited Speaker at the ICM in Berkeley, California. In 2015 he was elected a Fellow of the American Mathematical Society.

== Selected publications ==
=== Articles ===
- Stratification of real analytic mappings and images, Inventiones Mathematicae, vol. 28, 1975, pp. 193–208
- with Leon Simon: Boundary regularity and embedded solutions of the oriented Plateau problem, Annals of Mathematics, vol. 110, 1979, pp. 439–486. doi:10.1090/S0273-0979-1979-14581-6
- with Fang‐Hua Lin: Mappings minimizing the L^{p} norm of the gradient, Communications on Pure and Applied Mathematics, vol. 40, no. 5, 1987, pp. 555–588. doi:10.1002/cpa.3160400503
- Singularities of Harmonic Maps, Bull. Amer. Math. Soc. vol. 34, 1997, pp. 15–34 doi:10.1090/S0273-0979-97-00692-7

=== Books ===
- with Leon Simon: Seminar on geometric measure theory. DMV Seminar, Vol. 7, Birkhauser, 1986.
- as editor with Michael Wolf: Nonlinear partial differential equations in differential geometry, AMS, Institute for Advanced Study 1996
- as editor: Six Themes on Variation, Student Mathematical Library, Vol. 26, AMS, 2004
- with Thierry De Pauw and W.F. Pfeffer: Homology of normal chains and cohomology of charges, Providence, Rhode Island : American Mathematical Society, 2017.
