= Robert Bartnik =

Australian mathematician

- Born: 1956
- Died: 12 November 2022 (aged 65 or 66)
- Citizenship: Australia

Academic background
- Education: Melbourne University; Princeton University

Academic work
- Discipline: Mathematics
- Sub-discipline: Mathematical physics
- Institutions: Monash University

Robert Bartnik (1956 – 12 November 2022) was an Australian mathematician based at Monash University. He was known for his contributions to the rigorous mathematical study of general relativity.

== Biography ==
Bartnik was born in 1956. He received his bachelor's and master's degrees from Melbourne University where he was a resident of Ormond College. He was a visiting scholar at the Institute for Advanced Study in 1980–81. He received a PhD in mathematics from Princeton University in 1983, where his advisor was Shing-Tung Yau. He then had postdoctoral positions at New York University and Stanford University, then returned to Australia in 1985.

Bartnik was a Clay Senior Scholar, August to December 2005.

In 2004 he was elected to the Australian Academy of Science, with citation:

Professor Bartnik is renowned internationally for the application of geometric analysis to mathematical problems arising in Einstein's theory of general relativity. His work is characterised by his ability to uncover new and anticipated phenomena in space-time geometry, often employing sophisticated tools from linear and nonlinear partial differential equations as well as elaborate numerical computations. He has contributed greatly to our understanding of the properties of the Einstein equations and gravitation.

Bartnik died in 2022. A visiting fellowship programme at Monash University bears his name.

== Research ==
His work with John McKinnon has been widely studied in the physics literature. They show that there is a discrete set of static solutions to the coupled Einstein/Yang-Mills equations which are geodesically complete and asymptotically flat. This is interesting since such solutions are known not to exist in the cases of the Einstein vacuum equations, the coupled Einstein/Maxwell equations, and the Yang-Mills equations. Although Bartnik and McKinnon's work was numerical, their observed phenomena has been mathematically justified by Joel Smoller, Arthur Wasserman, Shing-Tung Yau, and Joel McLeod.

In the mathematics literature, he was known for his work with Leon Simon on solving the Dirichlet problem for prescribed mean curvature, in the setting of spacelike hypersurfaces of Minkowski space. His most widely cited work is on the geometric and analytic study of the ADM mass. He showed that it is geometrically defined by constructing "optimal" asymptotically flat coordinates, and gives an extension of Edward Witten's proof of the time-symmetric positive energy theorem to the higher-dimensional spin setting.

=== Major publications ===
As of 2022, Bartnik had been the author of around 30 research articles. The following publications are among the best-known:

- Bartnik, Robert; Simon, Leon (1982). "Spacelike hypersurfaces with prescribed boundary values and mean curvature". Communications in Mathematical Physics. 87 (1): 131–152. Bibcode:1982CMaPh..87..131B. doi:10.1007/bf01211061. MR 0680653. S2CID 55672824. Zbl 0512.53055.
- Bartnik, Robert (1984). "Existence of maximal surfaces in asymptotically flat spacetimes". Communications in Mathematical Physics. 94 (2): 155–175. Bibcode:1984CMaPh..94..155B. doi:10.1007/BF01209300. MR 0761792. S2CID 120000484. Zbl 0548.53054.
- Bartnik, Robert (1986). "The mass of an asymptotically flat manifold". Communications on Pure and Applied Mathematics. 39 (5): 661–693. doi:10.1002/cpa.3160390505. MR 0849427. Zbl 0598.53045.
- Bartnik, Robert; McKinnon, John (1988). "Particlelike solutions of the Einstein–Yang–Mills equations". Physical Review Letters. 61 (2): 141–144. Bibcode:1988PhRvL..61..141B. doi:10.1103/PhysRevLett.61.141. MR 0948143. PMID 10039043.
- Bartnik, Robert; Isenberg, Jim (2004). "The constraint equations". In Chruściel, Piotr T.; Friedrich, Helmut (eds.). The Einstein equations and the large scale behavior of gravitational fields: 50 years of the Cauchy problem in general relativity. Basel: Birkhäuser. pp. 1–38. arXiv:gr-qc/0405092. doi:10.1007/978-3-0348-7953-8_1. ISBN 3-7643-7130-7. MR 2098912. S2CID 118082763. Zbl 1073.83009.
