= Joseph Keller =

American mathematician (1923–2016)

Joseph Bishop Keller
- Born: July 31, 1923; Paterson, New Jersey, U.S.
- Died: September 7, 2016 (aged 93); Stanford, California, U.S.
- Education: New York University
- Known for: Geometrical theory of diffraction: Keller cone; Keller–Miksis formulation; Einstein–Brillouin–Keller method; Keller–Osserman conditions
- Awards: Lester R. Ford Award (1976, 1977); Gibbs Lecture (1977); Eringen Medal (1981); John von Neumann Prize (1983); Timoshenko Medal (1984); National Medal of Science (1988); ICM Speaker (1994); Nemmers Prize in Mathematics (1996); Wolf Prize (1997); Ig Nobel Prize (1999, 2012)
- Scientific career
- Fields: Mathematics
- Workplaces: New York University; Stanford University
- Thesis: Reflection and transmission of electromagnetic waves by thin curved shells
- Doctoral advisor: Richard Courant
- Doctoral students: Herbert Bishop Keller; George C. Papanicolaou; Bernard J. Matkowsky; L. Mahadevan

Joseph Bishop Keller (July 31, 1923 – September 7, 2016) was an American mathematician who specialized in applied mathematics. He was best known for his work on the geometrical theory of diffraction.

== Early life and education ==
Born in Paterson, New Jersey on July 31, 1923, Keller attended Eastside High School, where he was a member of the math team. After earning his undergraduate degree in 1943 at New York University, Keller obtained his PhD in 1948 from NYU under the supervision of Richard Courant. He was a professor of mathematics in the Courant Institute at New York University until 1979. Then he was Professor of Mathematics and Mechanical Engineering at Stanford University until 1993, when he became professor emeritus.

== Research ==
Keller worked on the application of mathematics to problems in science and engineering, such as wave propagation. He contributed to the Einstein–Brillouin–Keller method for computing eigenvalues in quantum mechanical systems.

== Awards and honors ==
Keller was awarded a Lester R. Ford Award (shared with David W. McLaughlin) in 1976 and (not shared) in 1977. In 1988 he was awarded the U.S. National Medal of Science, and in 1997 he was awarded the Wolf Prize by the Israel-based Wolf Foundation. In 1996, he was awarded the Nemmers Prize in Mathematics. In 1999 he was awarded the Ig Nobel Prize for calculating how to make a teapot spout that does not drip. With Patrick B. Warren, Robin C. Ball and Raymond E. Goldstein, Keller was awarded an Ig Nobel Prize in 2012 for calculating the forces that shape and move ponytail hair. In 2012 he became a fellow of the American Mathematical Society.

== Personal life ==
Keller's second wife, Alice S. Whittemore, started her career as a pure mathematician but shifted her interests to epidemiology and biostatistics. Keller had a brother who was also a mathematician, Herbert B. Keller, who studied numerical analysis, scientific computing, bifurcation theory, path following and homotopy methods, and computational fluid dynamics; Keller was the co-advisor of his brother Herbert's PhD thesis. Herbert Keller was a professor at Caltech. Both brothers contributed to the fields of electromagnetics and fluid dynamics. Joseph Keller died in Stanford, California on September 7, 2016, from a recurrence of kidney cancer first diagnosed in 2003.

== Selected publications ==
- J.B. Keller. On solutions of Δu=f(u). Comm. Pure Appl. Math. 10 (1957), 503–510.
- Edward W. Larsen and Joseph B. Keller. Asymptotic solution of neutron transport problems for small mean free paths. J. Mathematical Phys. 15 (1974), 75–81.
- Joseph B. Keller and Dan Givoli. Exact nonreflecting boundary conditions. J. Comput. Phys. 82 (1989), no. 1, 172–192.
- Jacob Rubinstein, Peter Sternberg, and Joseph B. Keller. Fast reaction, slow diffusion, and curve shortening. SIAM J. Appl. Math. 49 (1989), no. 1, 116–133.
- Marcus J. Grote and Joseph B. Keller. On nonreflecting boundary conditions. J. Comput. Phys. 122 (1995), no. 2, 231–243.
- Leonid Ryzhik, George Papanicolaou, and Joseph B. Keller. Transport equations for elastic and other waves in random media. Wave Motion 24 (1996), no. 4, 327–370.

== See also ==
- List of Ig Nobel Prize winners
