= Chikako Mese =

American mathematician

- Education: University of Dayton (BA); Stanford University (PhD)
- Scientific career
- Fields: differential geometry, geometric analysis
- Workplaces: Connecticut College; Johns Hopkins University
- Thesis: Minimal Surfaces and Conformal Mappings Into Singular Spaces (1996)
- Doctoral advisor: Richard Schoen

Chikako Mese is an American mathematician known for her work in differential geometry, geometric analysis and the theory of harmonic maps. She is a professor of mathematics at Johns Hopkins University.

== Education and career ==
Mese graduated from Elk Grove High School (Elk Grove Village, Illinois) in 1987. As a softball player at Elk Grove, she broke the national record for the number of runs scored in a season, with 69 runs. Although primarily a catcher, she played in seven different positions for her team, and also tied the state record for the most walks in a season, 35.

She earned a bachelor's degree in 1991 from the honors program at the University of Dayton, majoring in mathematics, and completed a Ph.D. in mathematics at Stanford University in 1996. Her dissertation, Minimal Surfaces and Conformal Mappings Into Singular Spaces, was supervised by Richard Schoen.

Before joining the Johns Hopkins University faculty in 2004 as an associate professor, she held assistant professorships at the University of Southern California and Connecticut College. At Johns Hopkins, she became the first tenured female mathematician. She was promoted to full professor in 2007, and chaired the mathematics department from 2008 to 2011.

== Recognition ==
In 2007, Elk Grove High School recognized Mese as a distinguished alumna. She was named a Simons Fellow by the Simons Foundation in 2017. She was elected as a Fellow of the American Mathematical Society in the 2020 Class, for "contributions to the theory of harmonic maps and their applications, and for service to the mathematical community".
