= Leon Simon =

Australian mathematician (born 1945)

Leon Melvyn Simon
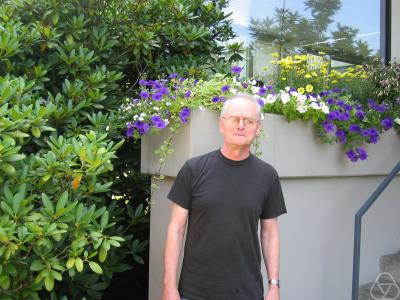
- Simon in 2005
- Born: 6 July 1945 (age 81)
- Education: University of Adelaide
- Known for: Łojasiewicz−Simon inequalities; Regularity theory of second-order elliptic partial differential equations, minimal hypersurfaces, and the mean curvature vector
- Awards: Leroy P. Steele Prize; Bôcher Memorial Prize; Australian Mathematical Society Medal; AAAS Fellow; AMS Fellow; Fellow of the Australian Academy of Science; Fellow of the Royal Society
- Scientific career
- Fields: Mathematics
- Workplaces: Flinders University; Australian National University; University of Melbourne; University of Minnesota; ETH Zurich; Stanford University
- Thesis: Interior Gradient Bounds for Non-Uniformly Elliptic Equations (1971)
- Doctoral advisor: James Henry Michael
- Doctoral students: Richard Schoen; Tatiana Toro

Leon Melvyn Simon FAA, born in 1945, is a Leroy P. Steele Prize and Bôcher Prize-winning mathematician, known for deep contributions to the fields of geometric analysis, geometric measure theory, and partial differential equations. He is currently Professor Emeritus in the Mathematics Department at Stanford University.

== Biography ==
=== Academic career ===
Leon Simon, born 6 July 1945, received his BSc from the University of Adelaide in 1967, and his PhD in 1971 from the same institution, under the direction of James H. Michael. His doctoral thesis was titled Interior Gradient Bounds for Non-Uniformly Elliptic Equations. He was employed from 1968 to 1971 as a Tutor in Mathematics by the university.

Simon has since held a variety of academic positions. He worked first at Flinders University as a lecturer, then at Australian National University as a professor, at the University of Melbourne, the University of Minnesota, at ETH Zurich, and at Stanford. He first came to Stanford in 1973 as Visiting Assistant Professor and was awarded a full professorship in 1986.

Simon has more than 100 'mathematical descendants', according to the Mathematics Genealogy Project. Among his doctoral students there are Richard Schoen, Neshan Wickramasekera and Tatiana Toro.

=== Honours ===
In 1983 Simon was awarded the Australian Mathematical Society Medal. In the same year he was elected as a Fellow of the Australian Academy of Science. He was an invited speaker at the 1983 International Congress of Mathematicians in Warsaw. In 1994, he was awarded the Bôcher Memorial Prize. The Bôcher Prize is awarded every five years to a groundbreaking author in analysis. In the same year he was also elected a fellow of the American Academy of Arts and Sciences. In May 2003 he was elected a fellow of the Royal Society. In 2012 he became a fellow of the American Mathematical Society. In 2017 he was awarded the Leroy P. Steele Prize for Seminal Contribution to Research.

== Research activity ==
Simon's best known work, for which he was honored with the Leroy P. Steele Prize for Seminal Contribution to Research, deals with the uniqueness of asymptotics of certain nonlinear evolution equations and Euler–Lagrange equations. The main tool is an infinite-dimensional extension and corollary of the Łojasiewicz inequality, using the standard Fredholm theory of elliptic operators and Lyapunov-Schmidt reduction. The resulting Łojasiewicz−Simon inequalities are of interest in and of themselves and have found many applications in geometric analysis.

Simon's primary applications of his Łojasiewicz−Simon inequalities deal with the uniqueness of tangent cones of minimal surfaces and of tangent maps of harmonic maps, making use of the deep regularity theories of William Allard, Richard Schoen, and Karen Uhlenbeck. Other authors have made fundamental use of Simon's results, such as Rugang Ye's use for the uniqueness of subsequential limits of Yamabe flow. A simplification and extension of some aspects of Simon's work was later found by Mohamed Ali Jendoubi and others.

Simon also made a general study of the Willmore functional for surfaces in general codimension, relating the value of the functional to several geometric quantities. Such geometric estimates have proven to be relevant in a number of other important works, such as in Ernst Kuwert and Reiner Schätzle's analysis of Willmore flow and in Hubert Bray's proof of the Riemannian Penrose inequality. Simon himself was able to apply his analysis to establish the existence of minimizers of the Willmore functional with prescribed topological type.

With his thesis advisor James Michael, Simon provided a fundamental Sobolev inequality for submanifolds of Euclidean space, the form of which depends only on dimension and on the length of the mean curvature vector. An extension to submanifolds of Riemannian manifolds is due to David Hoffman and Joel Spruck. Due to the geometric dependence of the Michael−Simon and Hoffman−Spruck inequalities, they have been crucial in a number of contexts, including in Schoen and Shing-Tung Yau's resolution of the positive mass theorem and Gerhard Huisken's analysis of mean curvature flow.

Robert Bartnik and Simon considered the problem of prescribing the boundary and mean curvature of a spacelike hypersurface of Minkowski space. They set up the problem as a second-order partial differential equation for a scalar graphing function, giving novel perspective and results for some of the underlying issues previously considered in Shiu-Yuen Cheng and Yau's analysis of similar problems.

Using approximation by harmonic polynomials, Robert Hardt and Simon studied the zero set of solutions of general second-order elliptic partial differential equations, obtaining information on Hausdorff measure and rectifiability. By combining their results with earlier results of Harold Donnelly and Charles Fefferman, they obtained asymptotic information on the sizes of the zero sets of the eigenfunctions of the Laplace-Beltrami operator on a Riemannian manifold.

Schoen, Simon, and Yau studied stable minimal hypersurfaces of Riemannian manifolds, identifying a simple combination of Simons' formula with the stability inequality which produced various curvature estimates. As a consequence, they were able to re-derive some results of Simons such as the Bernstein theorem in appropriate dimensions. The Schoen−Simon−Yau estimates were adapted from the setting of minimal surfaces to that of "self-shrinking" surfaces by Tobias Colding and William Minicozzi, as part of their analysis of singularities of mean curvature flow. The stable minimal hypersurface theory itself was taken further by Schoen and Simon six years later, using novel methods to provide geometric estimates without dimensional restriction. As opposed to the earlier purely analytic estimates, Schoen and Simon used the machinery of geometric measure theory. The Schoen−Simon estimates are fundamental for the general Almgren–Pitts min-max theory, and consequently for its various applications.

William Meeks, Simon, and Yau obtained a number of remarkable results on minimal surfaces and the topology of three-dimensional manifolds, building in large part on earlier works of Meeks and Yau. Some similar results were obtained around the same time by Michael Freedman, Joel Hass, and Peter Scott.

== Bibliography ==
Textbooks.

- Simon, Leon (1983). Lectures on geometric measure theory. Proceedings of the Centre for Mathematical Analysis. Vol. 3. Canberra: Centre for Mathematical Analysis at Australian National University. ISBN 0-86784-429-9. MR 0756417. Zbl 0546.49019.
- Simon, Leon (1996). Theorems on regularity and singularity of energy minimizing maps. Lectures in Mathematics ETH Zürich. Based on lecture notes by Norbert Hungerbühler. Basel: Birkhäuser Verlag. doi:10.1007/978-3-0348-9193-6. ISBN 3-7643-5397-X. MR 1399562. Zbl 0864.58015.
- Simon, Leon (2008). An Introduction to Multivariable Mathematics. Morgan & Claypool Publishers. ISBN 978-1-59829-801-7.

Articles.

- Michael, J. H.; Simon, L. M. (1973). "Sobolev and mean-value inequalities on generalized submanifolds of R^{n}". Communications on Pure and Applied Mathematics. 26 (3): 361–379. doi:10.1002/cpa.3160260305. MR 0344978. Zbl 0256.53006.
- Schoen, R.; Simon, L.; Yau, S. T. (1975). "Curvature estimates for minimal hypersurfaces". Acta Mathematica. 134 (3–4): 275–288. doi:10.1007/BF02392104. MR 0423263. Zbl 0323.53039.
- Hardt, Robert; Simon, Leon (1979). "Boundary regularity and embedded solutions for the oriented Plateau problem". Annals of Mathematics. Second Series. 110 (3): 439–486. doi:10.2307/1971233. JSTOR 1971233. MR 0554379. Zbl 0457.49029.
- Schoen, Richard; Simon, Leon (1981). "Regularity of stable minimal hypersurfaces". Communications on Pure and Applied Mathematics. 34 (6): 741–797. doi:10.1002/cpa.3160340603. MR 0634285. Zbl 0497.49034.
- Bartnik, Robert; Simon, Leon (1982). "Spacelike hypersurfaces with prescribed boundary values and mean curvature". Communications in Mathematical Physics. 87 (1): 131–152. Bibcode:1982CMaPh..87..131B. doi:10.1007/BF01211061. MR 0680653. S2CID 55672824. Zbl 0512.53055.
- Meeks, William III; Simon, Leon; Yau, Shing Tung (1982). "Embedded minimal surfaces, exotic spheres, and manifolds with positive Ricci curvature". Annals of Mathematics. Second Series. 116 (3): 621–659. doi:10.2307/2007026. JSTOR 2007026. MR 0678484. Zbl 0521.53007.
- Simon, Leon (1983). "Asymptotics for a class of nonlinear evolution equations, with applications to geometric problems". Annals of Mathematics. Second Series. 118 (3): 525–571. doi:10.2307/2006981. JSTOR 2006981. MR 0727703. Zbl 0549.35071.
- Hardt, Robert; Simon, Leon (1989). "Nodal sets for solutions of elliptic equations". Journal of Differential Geometry. 30 (2): 505–522. Bibcode:1989JDGeo..3043599H. doi:10.4310/jdg/1214443599. MR 1010169. Zbl 0692.35005.
- Simon, Leon (1993). "Existence of surfaces minimizing the Willmore functional". Communications in Analysis and Geometry. 1 (2): 281–326. doi:10.4310/CAG.1993.v1.n2.a4. MR 1243525. Zbl 0848.58012.
