= Robert Osserman =

American mathematician (1926–2011)

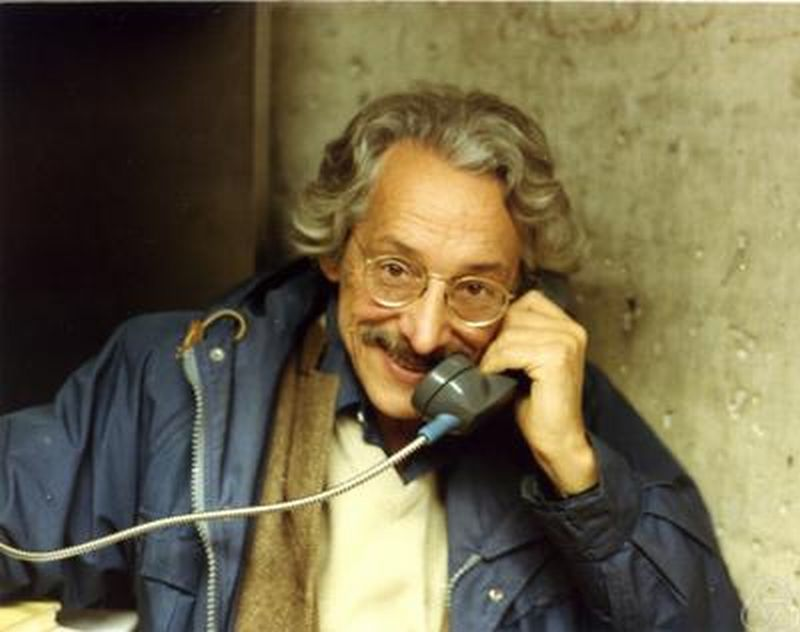
- Osserman in 1984
- Born: December 19, 1926
- Died: November 30, 2011 (aged 84)
- Education: Harvard University
- Known for: Osserman conjecture Osserman manifolds Osserman's theorem Nirenberg's conjecture Osserman–Xavier–Fujimoto theorem Keller–Osserman conditions
- Awards: Lester R. Ford Award (1980)
- Scientific career
- Fields: Mathematics
- Workplaces: Stanford University
- Doctoral advisor: Lars Ahlfors
- Notable students: H. Blaine Lawson; David Allen Hoffman; Michael Gage

Robert "Bob" Osserman (December 19, 1926 – November 30, 2011) was an American mathematician who worked in geometry. He is specially remembered for his work on the theory of minimal surfaces. There are many mathematical concepts named after him.

Raised in Bronx, he went to Bronx High School of Science (diploma, 1942) and New York University. He earned a Ph.D. in 1955 from Harvard University with the thesis Contributions to the Problem of Type (on Riemann surfaces) supervised by Lars Ahlfors.

He joined Stanford University in 1955. He joined the Mathematical Sciences Research Institute in 1990. He worked on geometric function theory, differential geometry, the two integrated in a theory of minimal surfaces, isoperimetric inequality, and other issues in the areas of astronomy, geometry, cartography and complex function theory.

Osserman was the head of mathematics at Office of Naval Research, a Fulbright Lecturer at the University of Paris and Guggenheim Fellow at the University of Warwick. He edited numerous books and promoted mathematics, such as in interviews with celebrities Steve Martin and Alan Alda.

He was an invited speaker at the International Congress of Mathematicians (ICM) of 1978 in Helsinki.

He received the Lester R. Ford Award (1980) of the Mathematical Association of America for his popular science writings.

H. Blaine Lawson, David Allen Hoffman and Michael Gage were Ph.D. students of his.

Robert Osserman died on Wednesday, November 30, 2011 at his home.

== Mathematical contributions ==
Osserman made fundamental contributions to the theory of minimal surfaces, geometric function theory, and isoperimetric inequalities. One of his most celebrated results is a proof of the Nirenberg conjecture (1959), which established that a complete minimal surface in Euclidean space whose Gauss map omits a set of positive spherical measure must be a plane. This result, later extended by Xavier and Fujimoto, is now known as the Osserman–Xavier–Fujimoto theorem.

In 1978, Osserman published a comprehensive survey on the isoperimetric inequality in the Bulletin of the American Mathematical Society, which became a standard reference in the field.

=== Non-existence for the minimal surface system in higher codimension ===
In collaboration with his former student H. Blaine Lawson, Osserman studied the minimal surface problem in the case that the codimension is larger than one. They considered the case of a graphical minimal submanifold of euclidean space. Their conclusion was that most of the analytical properties which hold in the codimension-one case fail to extend. Solutions to the boundary value problem may exist and fail to be unique, or in other situations may simply fail to exist. Such submanifolds (given as graphs) might not solve the Plateau problem, as they must in the case of graphical hypersurfaces of Euclidean space.

Their results pointed to the analytical difficulty of general elliptic systems and of the minimal submanifold problem in particular. Many of these issues are still not understood, despite their significance in the theory of calibrated geometry and the Strominger–Yau–Zaslow conjecture.

== Books ==
- Two-Dimensional Calculus (Harcourt, Brace & World, 1968; Krieger, 1977; Dover Publications, Inc, 2011) ISBN 978-0155924109 ; ISBN 978-0882754734 ; ISBN 978-0486481630
- A Survey of Minimal Surfaces (1969, 1986) ISBN 978-0486649986
- Poetry of the Universe: A Mathematical Exploration of the Cosmos (Random House, 1995) ISBN 978-0307790583

== Awards ==
- John Simon Guggenheim Memorial Foundation fellow (1976)
- Lester R. Ford Award (1980)
- 2003 Joint Policy Board for Mathematics Communications Award.

== Topics named after Robert Osserman ==
- Osserman conjecture
- Osserman manifolds
- Osserman's theorem
- Stanford University's Robert Osserman Teaching Award

== Selected research papers ==
- Osserman, Robert (1957). "On the inequality Δu≥f(u)". Pacific Journal of Mathematics. 7 (4): 1641–1647. doi:10.2140/pjm.1957.7.1641.
- Osserman, Robert (1964). "Global properties of minimal surfaces in E^{3} and E^{n}". Annals of Mathematics. Second series. 80 (2): 340–364. doi:10.2307/1970396. JSTOR 1970396.
- Osserman, Robert (1970). "A proof of the regularity everywhere of the classical solution to Plateau's problem". Annals of Mathematics. Second series. 91 (3): 550–569. doi:10.2307/1970637. JSTOR 1970637.
- Lawson Jr., H. B.; Osserman, R. (1977). "Non-existence, non-uniqueness and irregularity of solutions to the minimal surface system". Acta Mathematica. 139 (1–2): 1–17. doi:10.1007/BF02392232.
- Osserman, Robert (May 1959). "Proof of a conjecture of Nirenberg". Communications on Pure and Applied Mathematics. 12 (2): 229–232. doi:10.1002/cpa.3160120203.
- Chern, Shiing-Shen; Osserman, Robert (1967). "Complete minimal surfaces in euclidean n-space". Journal d'Analyse Mathématique. 19: 15–34. doi:10.1007/BF02788707.
