= Beno Eckmann =

Swiss mathematician (1917–2008)

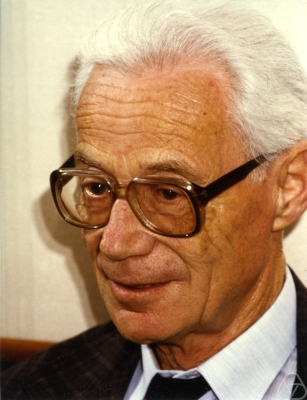
- Beno Eckmann (1988)
- Born: 31 March 1917; Bern, Switzerland
- Died: 25 November 2008 (aged 91); Zürich, Switzerland
- Education: ETH Zurich
- Known for: Calabi–Eckmann manifolds Eckmann–Hilton duality Eckmann–Hilton argument Eckmann–Shapiro lemma Injective hull
- Awards: Albert Einstein Medal (2008)
- Scientific career
- Fields: Mathematics
- Workplaces: ETH Zurich
- Doctoral advisor: Heinz Hopf
- Doctoral students: Alfred Aeppli; Erwin Bolthausen; Alfred Frölicher; Hans Grauert; Peter J. Huber; Michel Kervaire; Ernst Specker; Urs Stammbach; Max-Albert Knus

Beno Eckmann (31 March 1917 – 25 November 2008) was a Swiss mathematician who made contributions to algebraic topology, homological algebra, group theory, and differential geometry.

== Life ==
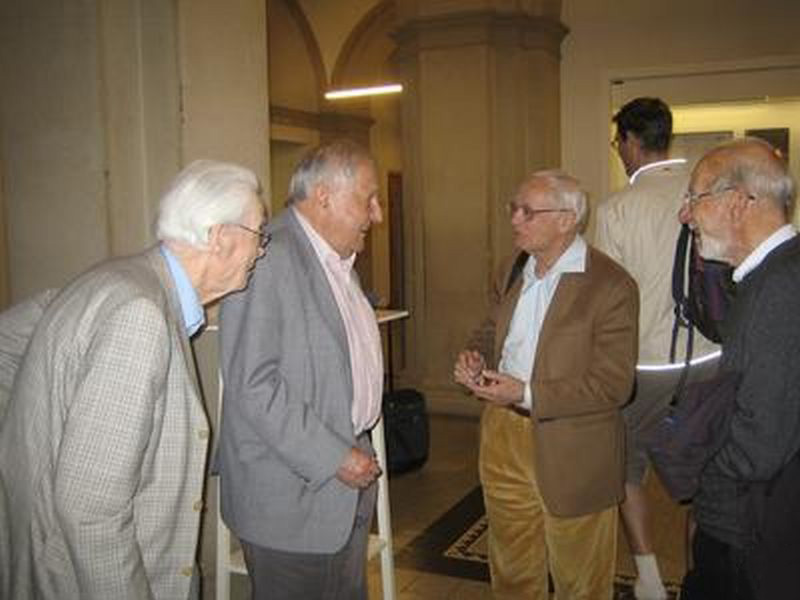
Beno Eckmann, Peter Hilton, Jean-Pierre Serre, and André Haefliger in Zürich in 2007

Born to a Jewish family in Bern, Eckmann received his master's degree from Eidgenössische Technische Hochschule Zürich (ETH) in 1939. Later, he studied there under Heinz Hopf, obtaining his Ph.D. in 1941. His dissertation, on homotopy theory, was jointly supervised by Heinz Hopf and Ferdinand Gonseth.

In 1942 he obtained a lecturer position at the University of Lausanne. He became an extraordinary professor there before, in 1948, taking a full professorship at ETH Zurich, where he remained until his 1984 retirement. He was also President of the Swiss Mathematical Society for 1961–1962, and the founding head of the Mathematics Research Institute at ETH Zurich from 1964 until his retirement.

== Recognition ==
A colloquium in honor of Eckmann's 60th birthday was held in Zurich in 1977. Eckmann was elected to the Academia Europaea in 1993. He was the 2008 recipient of the Albert Einstein Medal.

He was awarded honorary degrees by the University of Fribourg in 1964, the École Polytechnique Fédérale de Lausanne in 1967, and the Technion – Israel Institute of Technology in 1983.

== Legacy ==
Calabi–Eckmann manifolds, Eckmann–Hilton duality, the Eckmann–Hilton argument, and the Eckmann–Shapiro lemma are named after Eckmann.

== Family ==
Eckmann's son is the mathematical physicist Jean-Pierre Eckmann.
